= List of people from Alaska =

State flag of Alaska

Location of Alaska in the United States

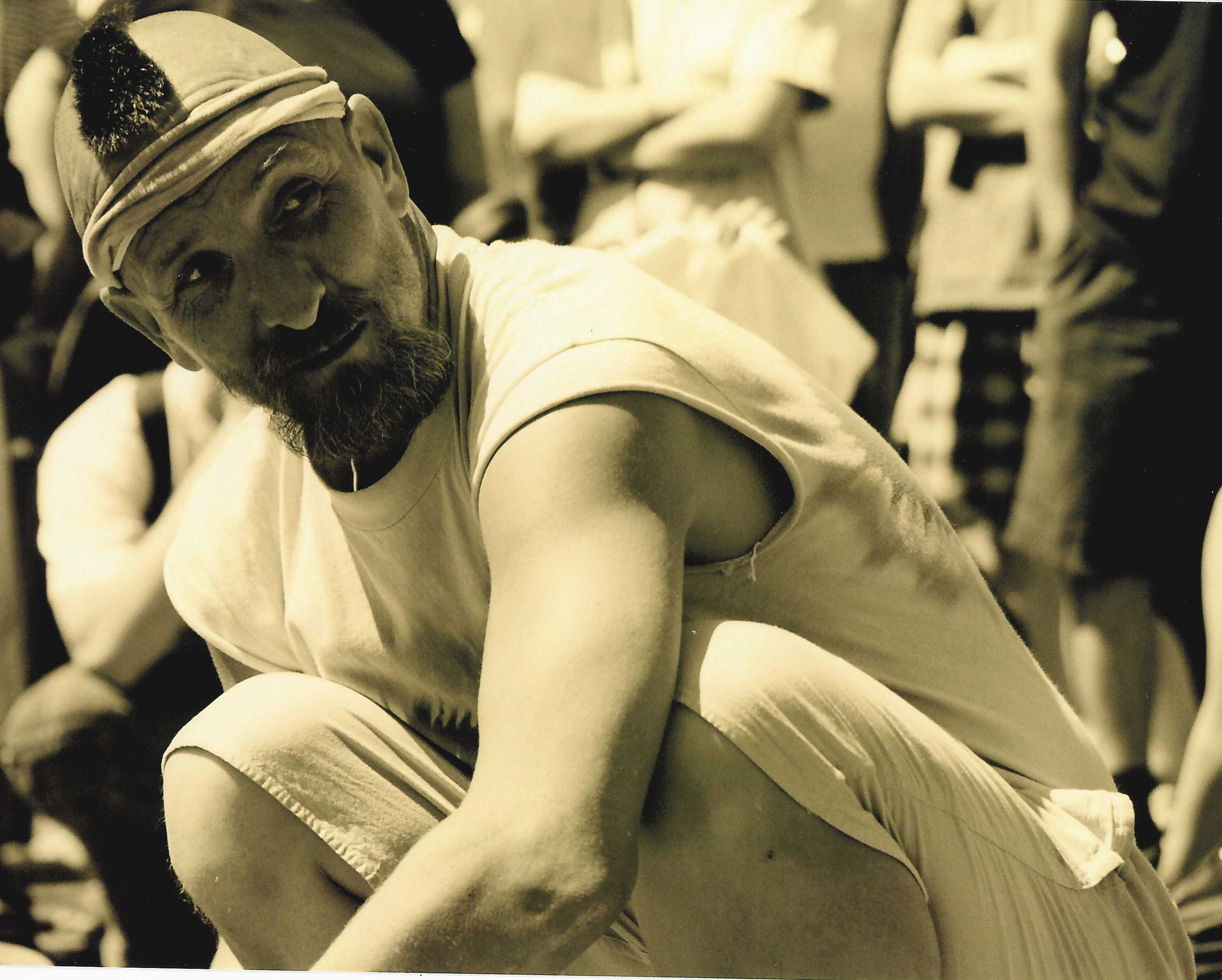
Artis the Spoonman

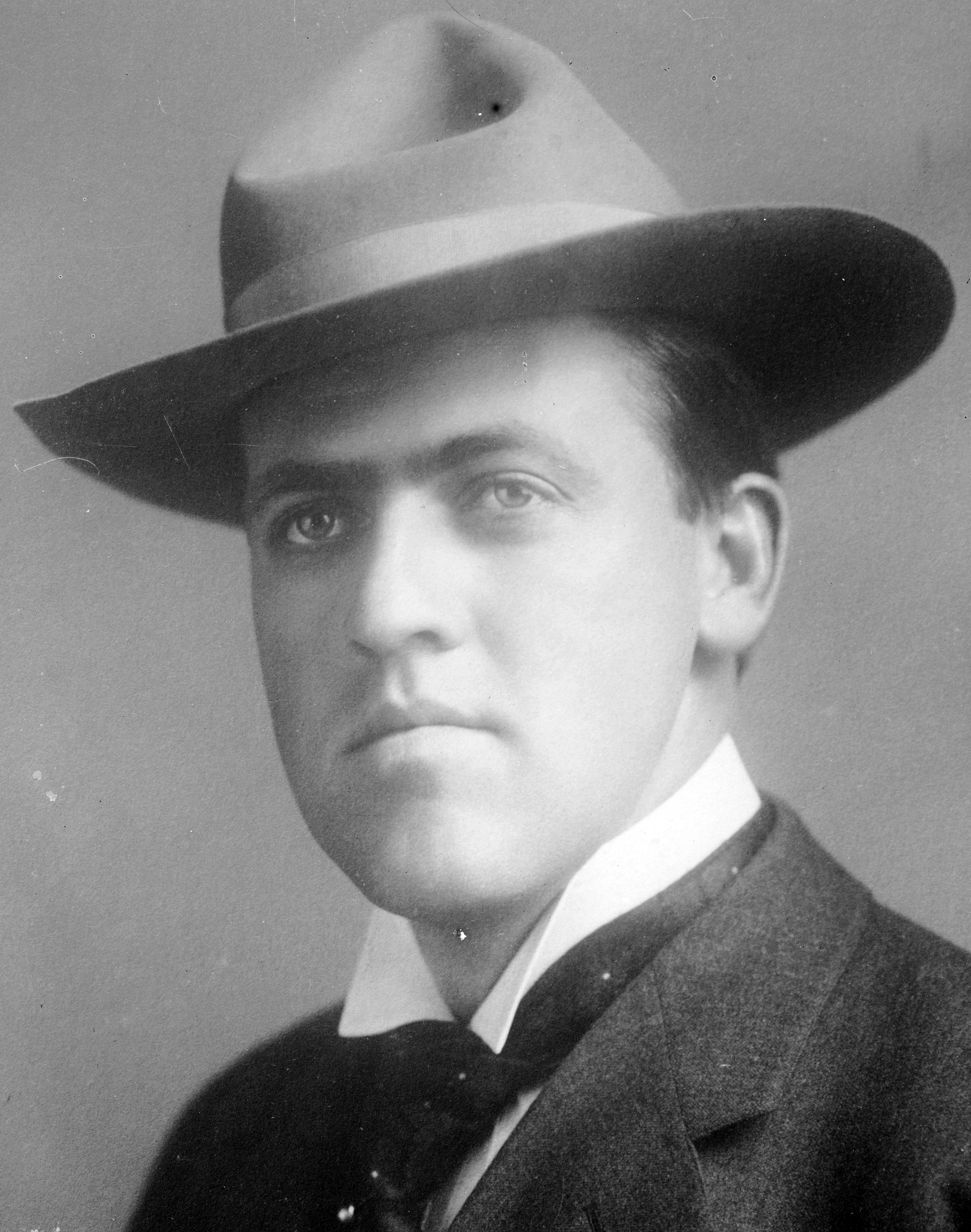
Rex Beach

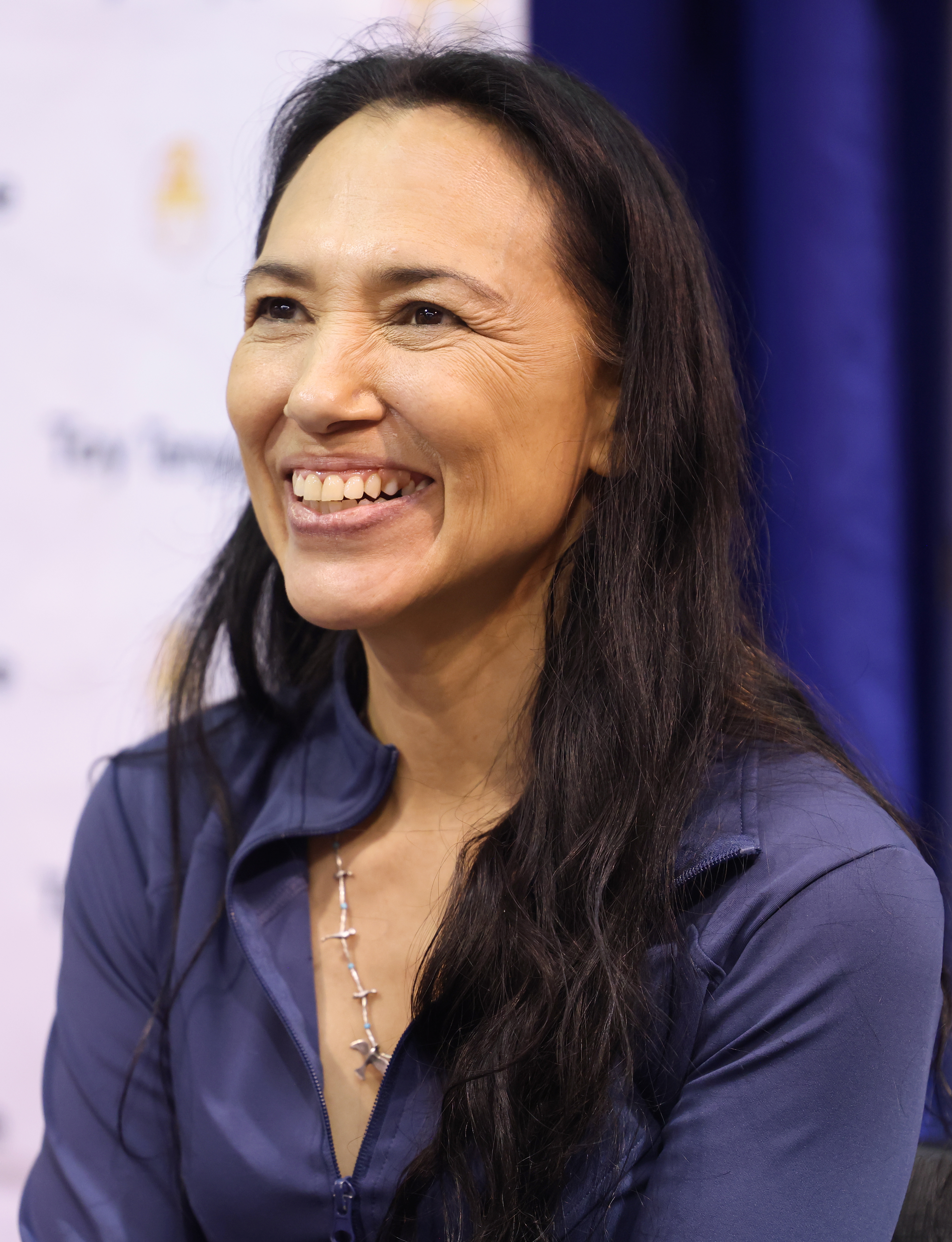
Irene Bedard

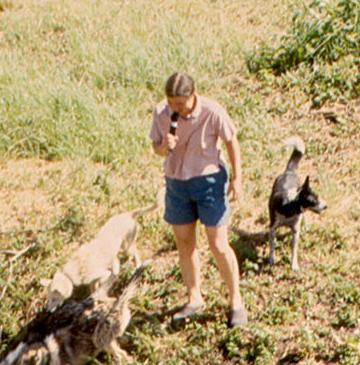
Susan Butcher

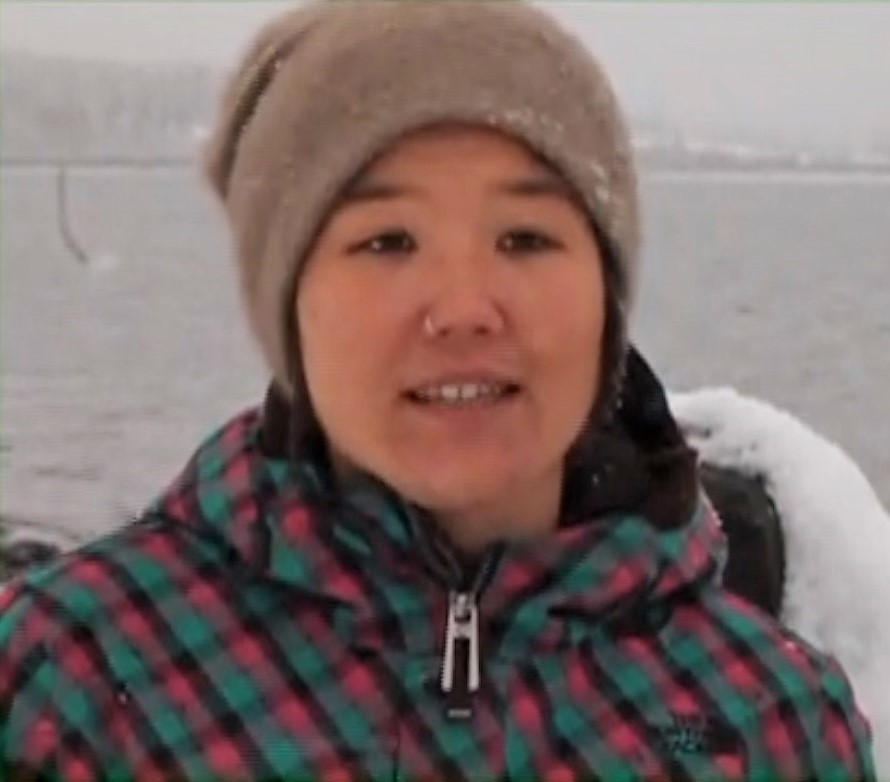
Callan Chythlook-Sifsof

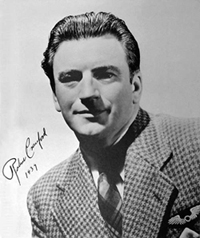
Robert Crawford

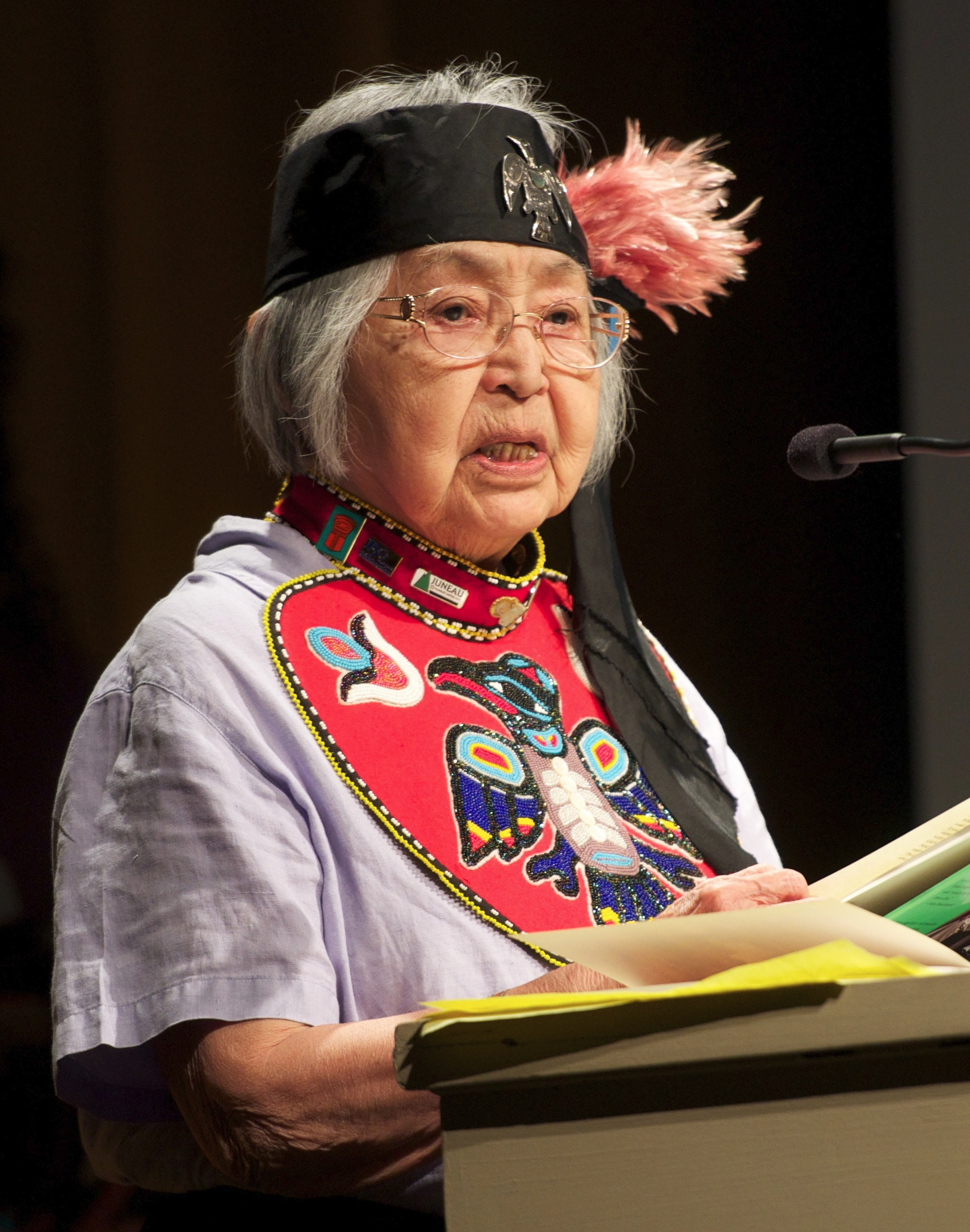
Nora Marks Dauenhauer

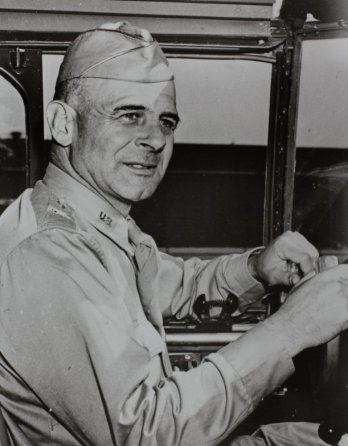
Jimmy Doolittle

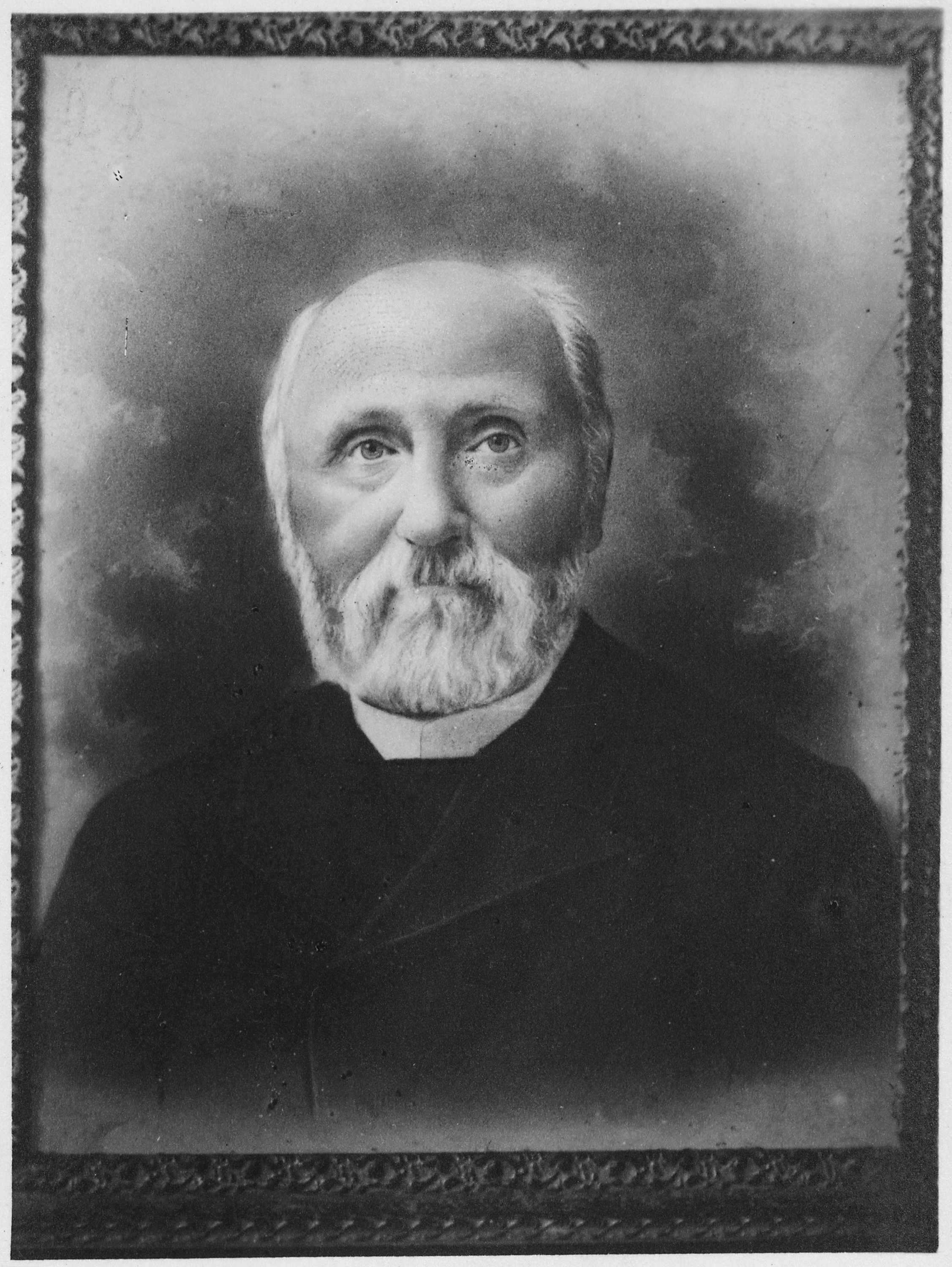
William Duncan

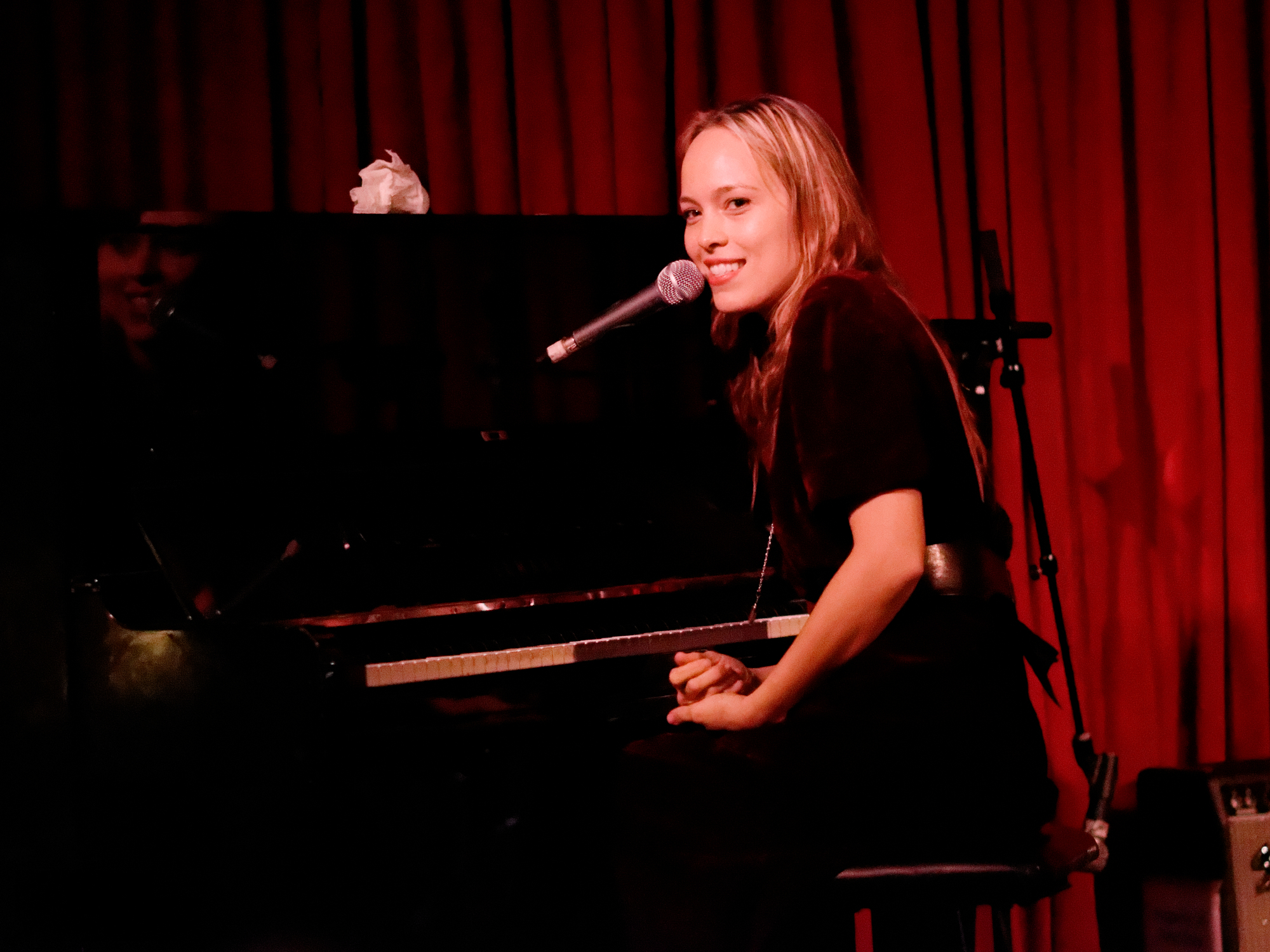
Kate Earl

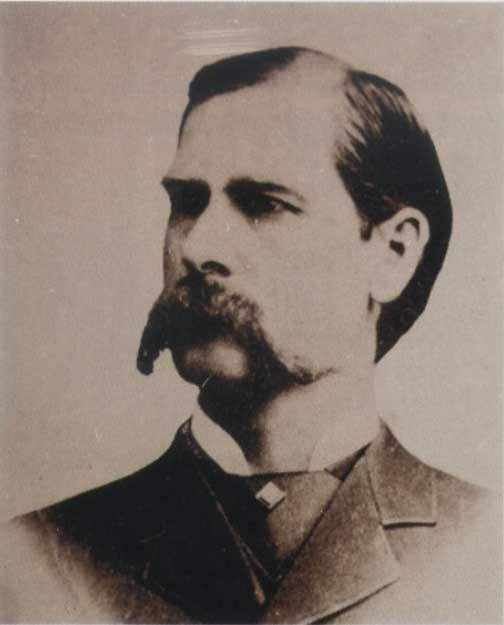
Wyatt Earp

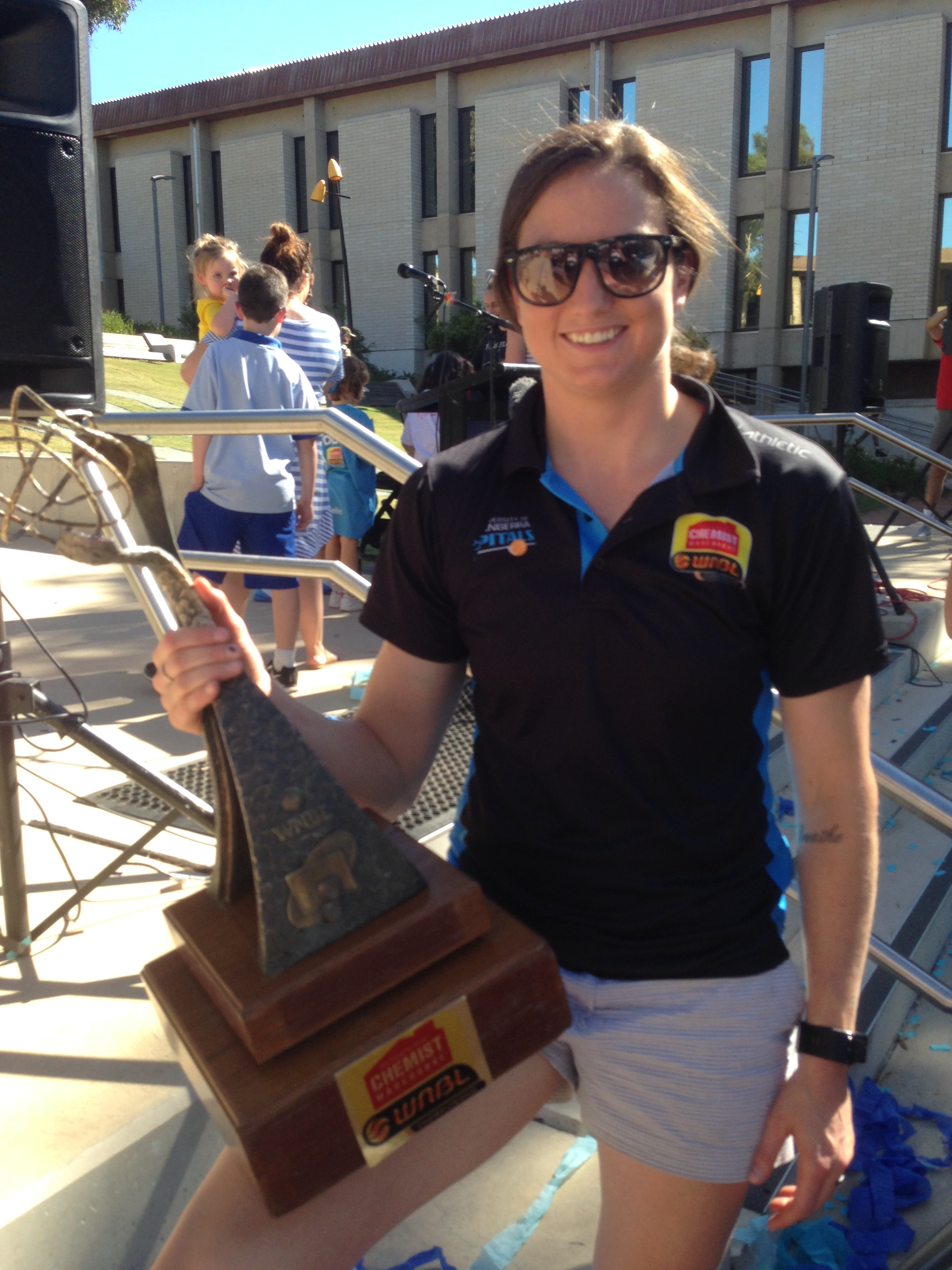
Kelsey Griffin

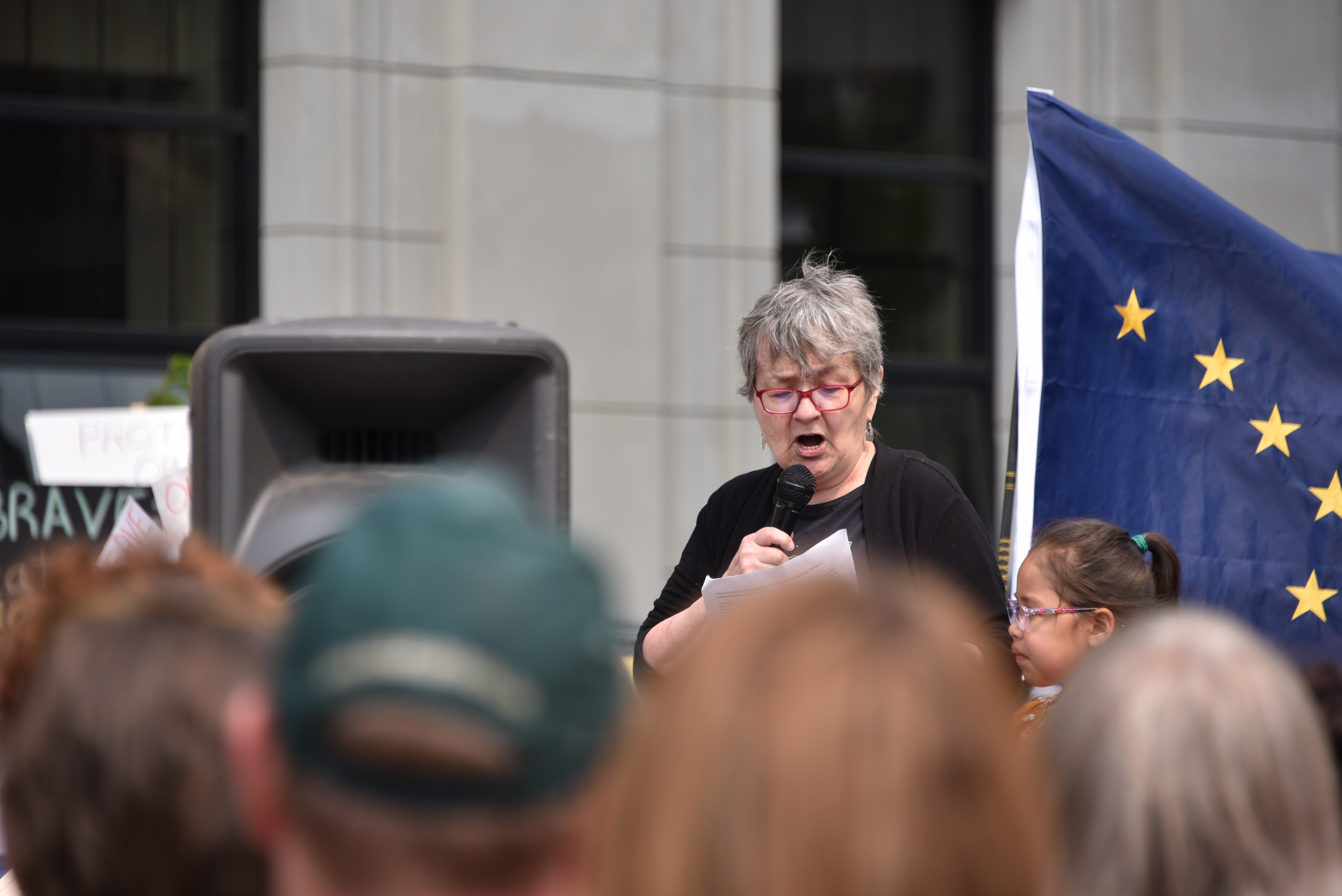
Ernestine Hayes

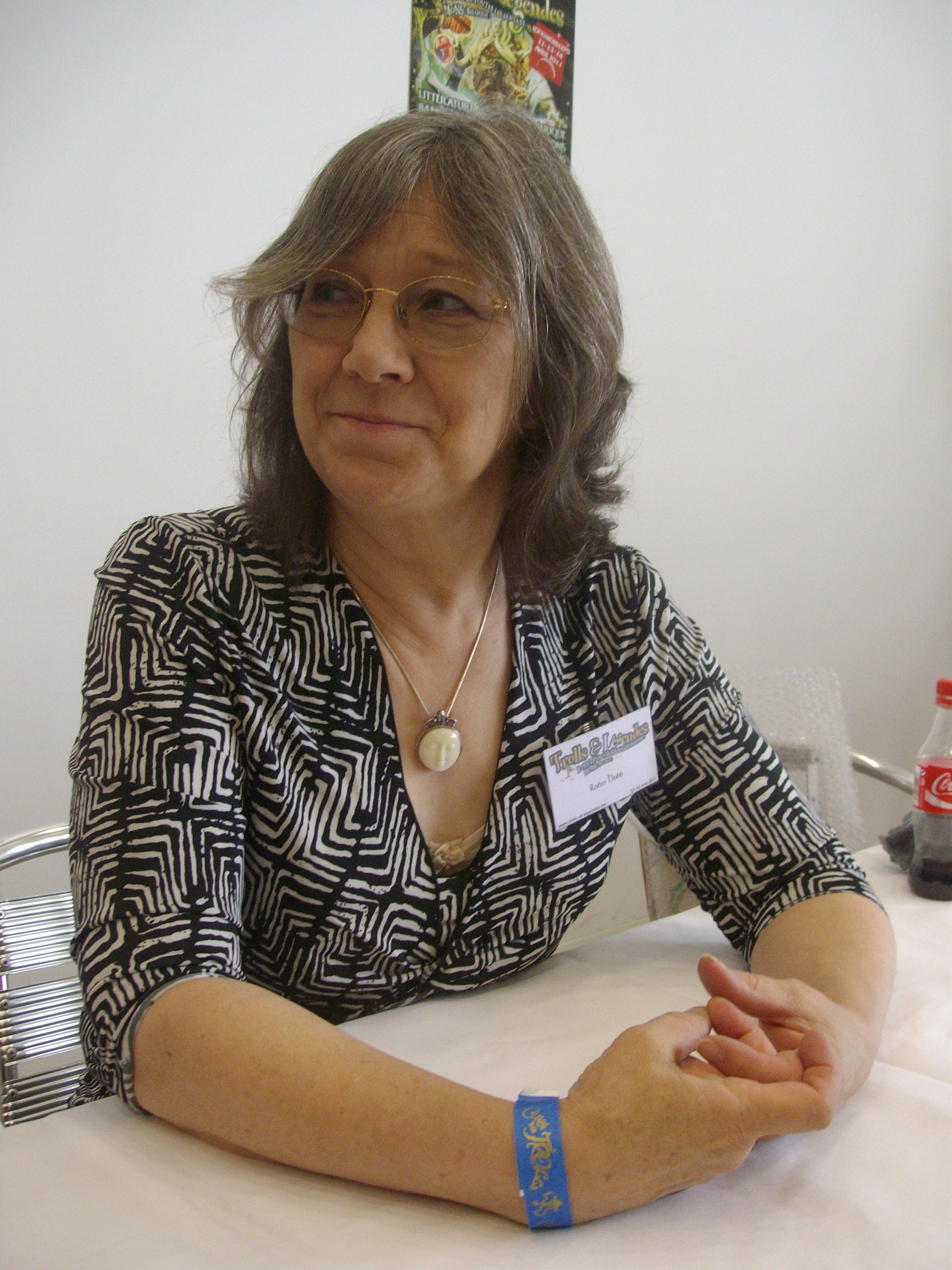
Robin Hobb

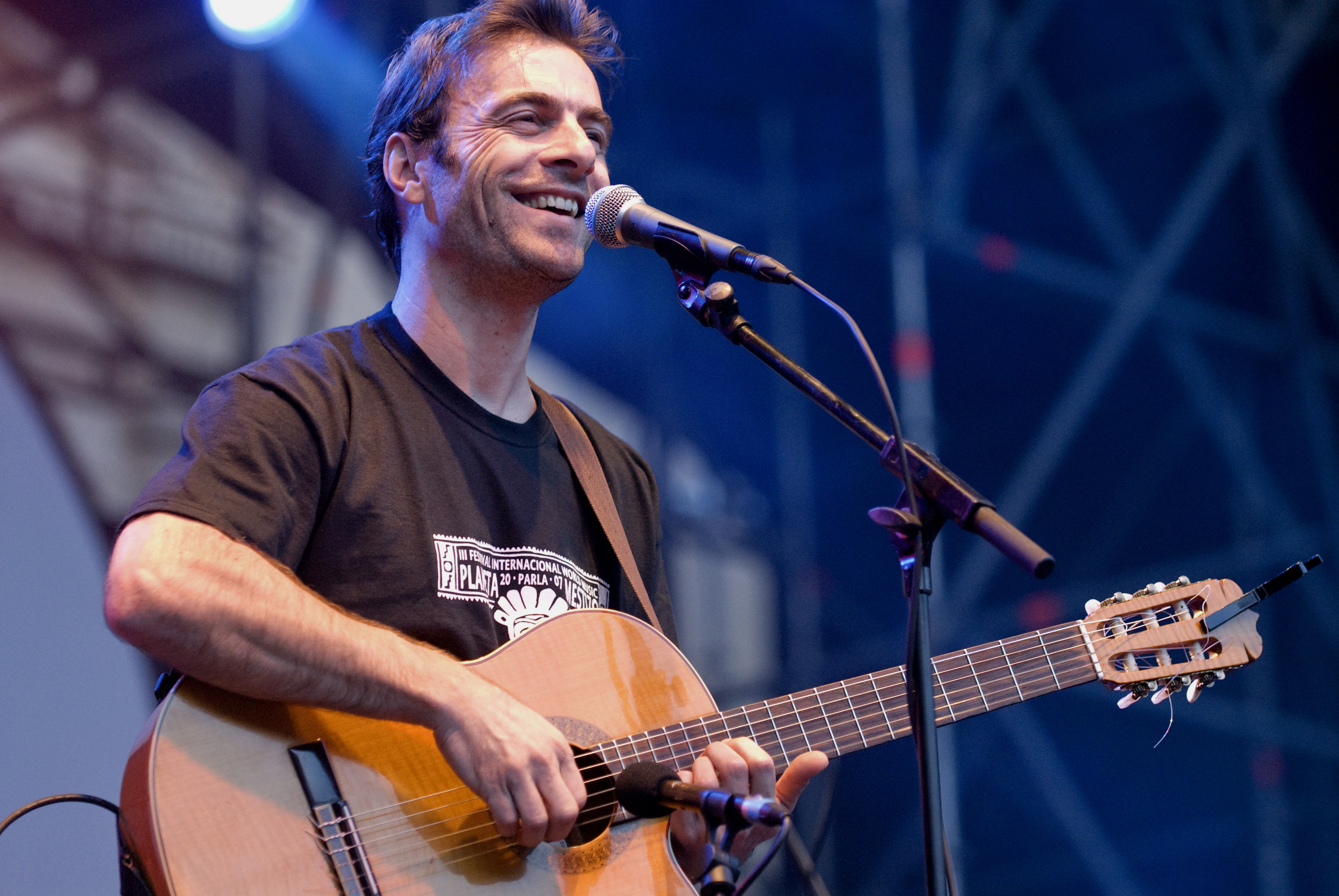
Kevin Johansen

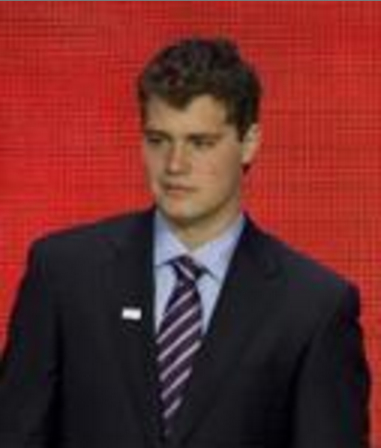
Levi Johnston

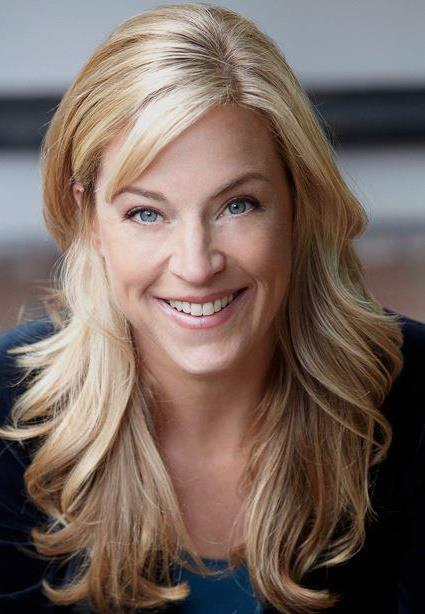
Jennifer Jolly

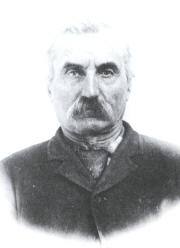
Joseph Juneau

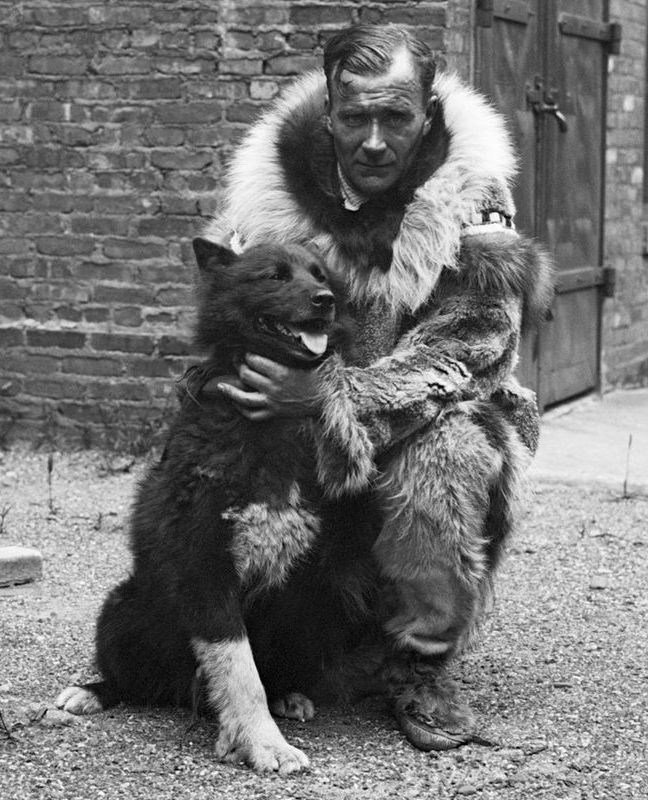
Gunnar Kaasen

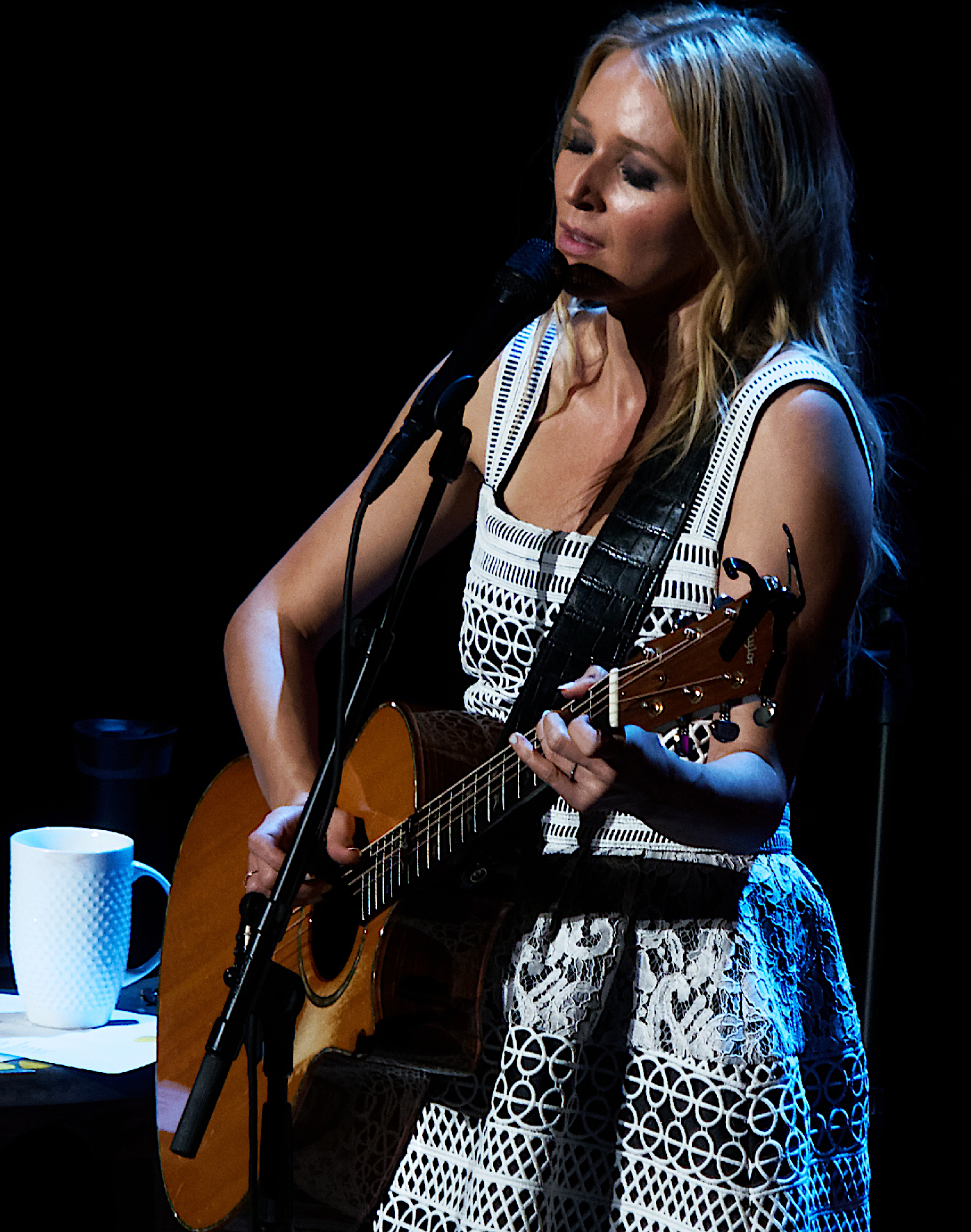
Jewel Kilcher

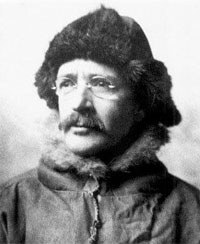
Sydney Laurence

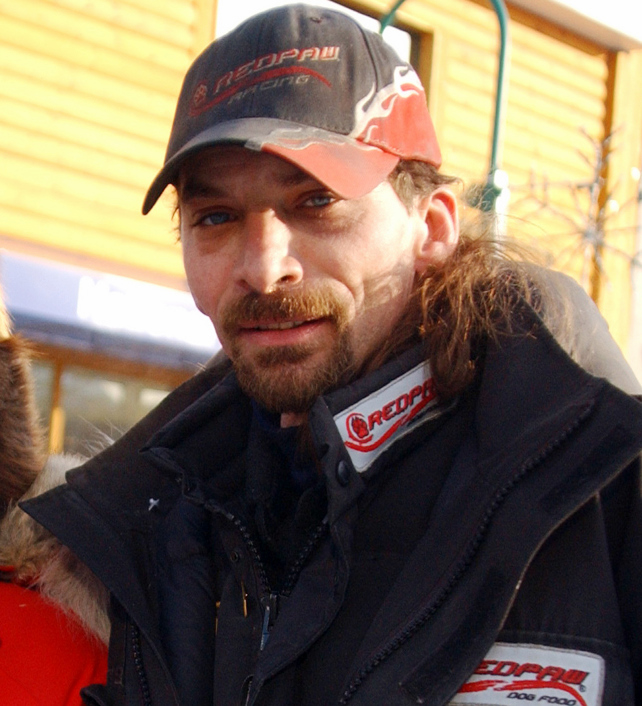
Lance Mackey

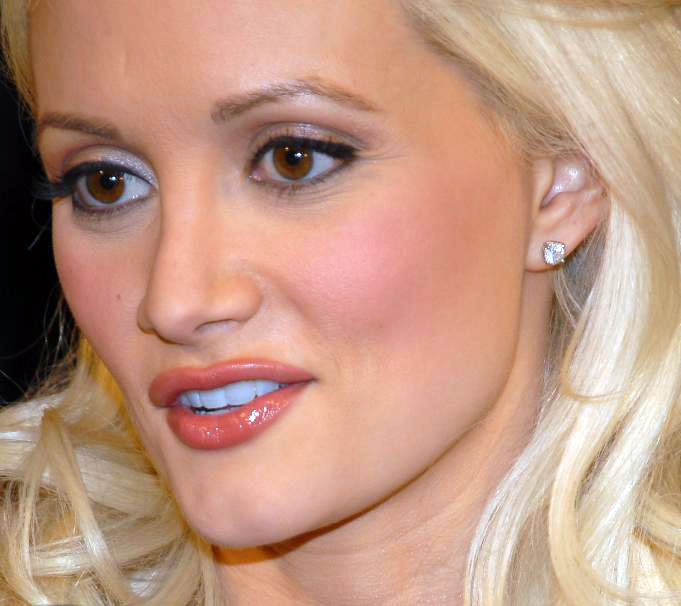
Holly Madison

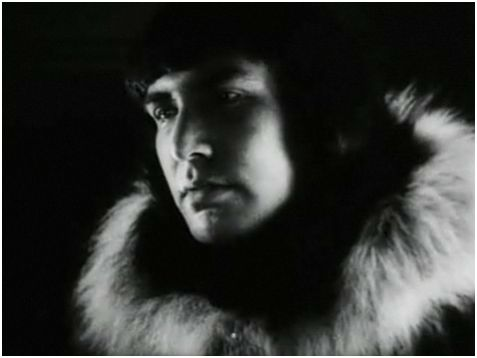
Ray Mala

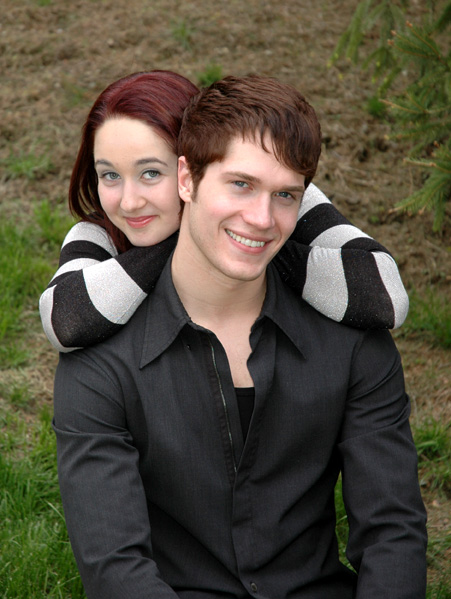
Drew Meekins

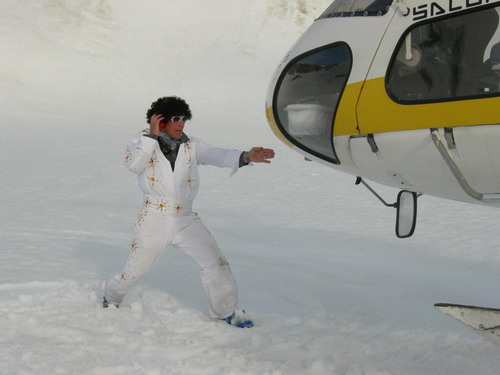
Tommy Moe

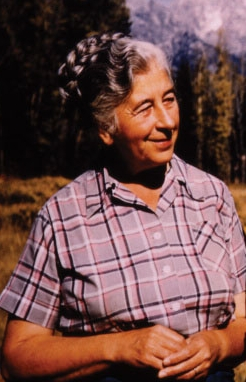
Olaus Murie

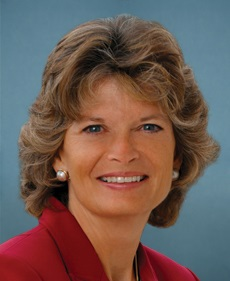
Lisa Murkowski

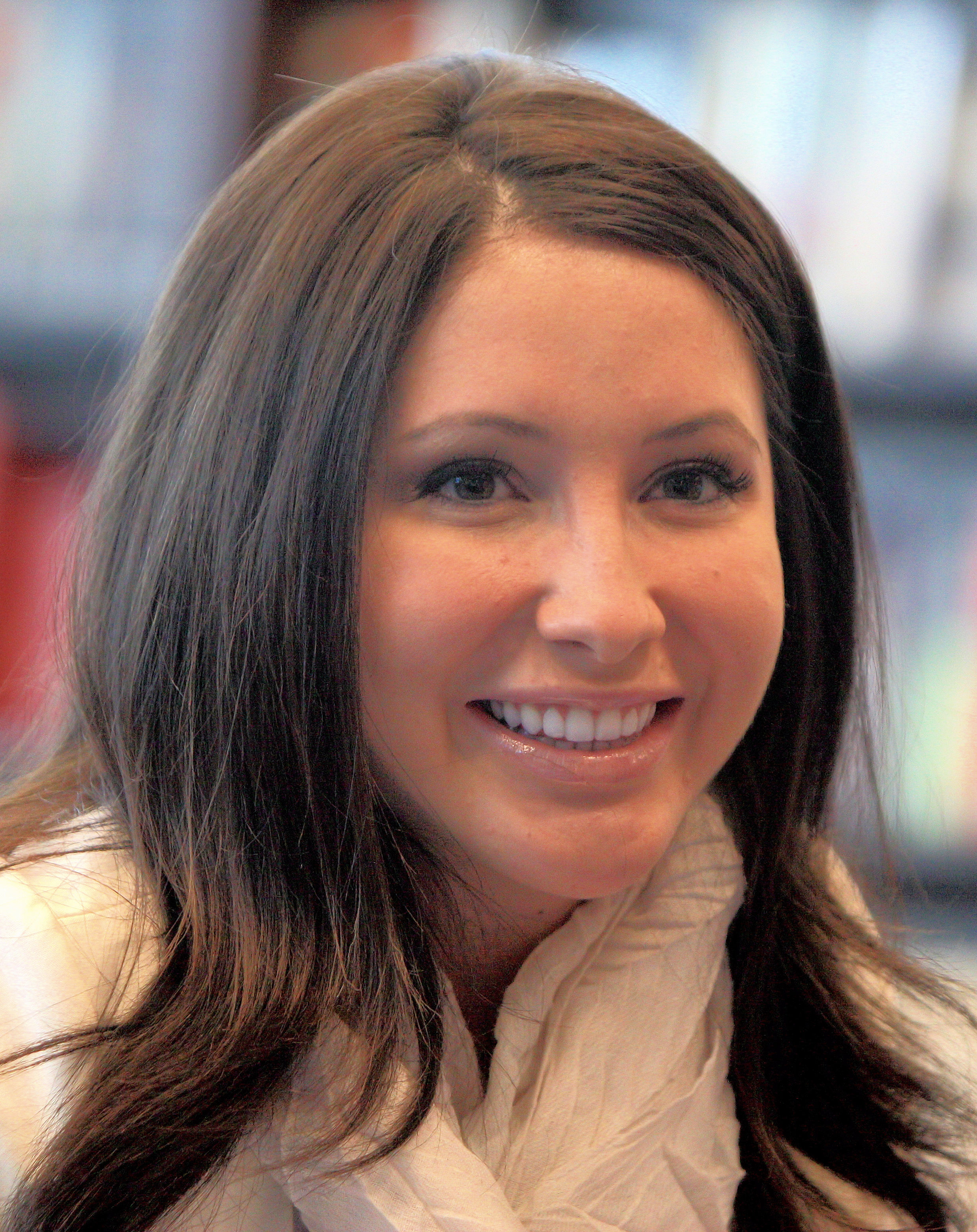
Bristol Palin

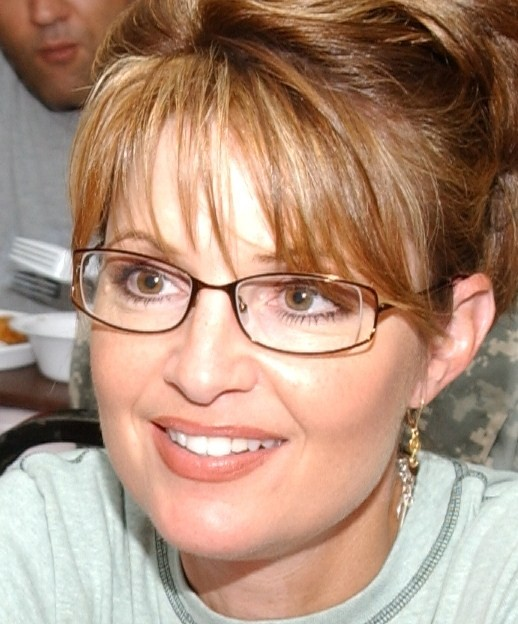
Sarah Palin

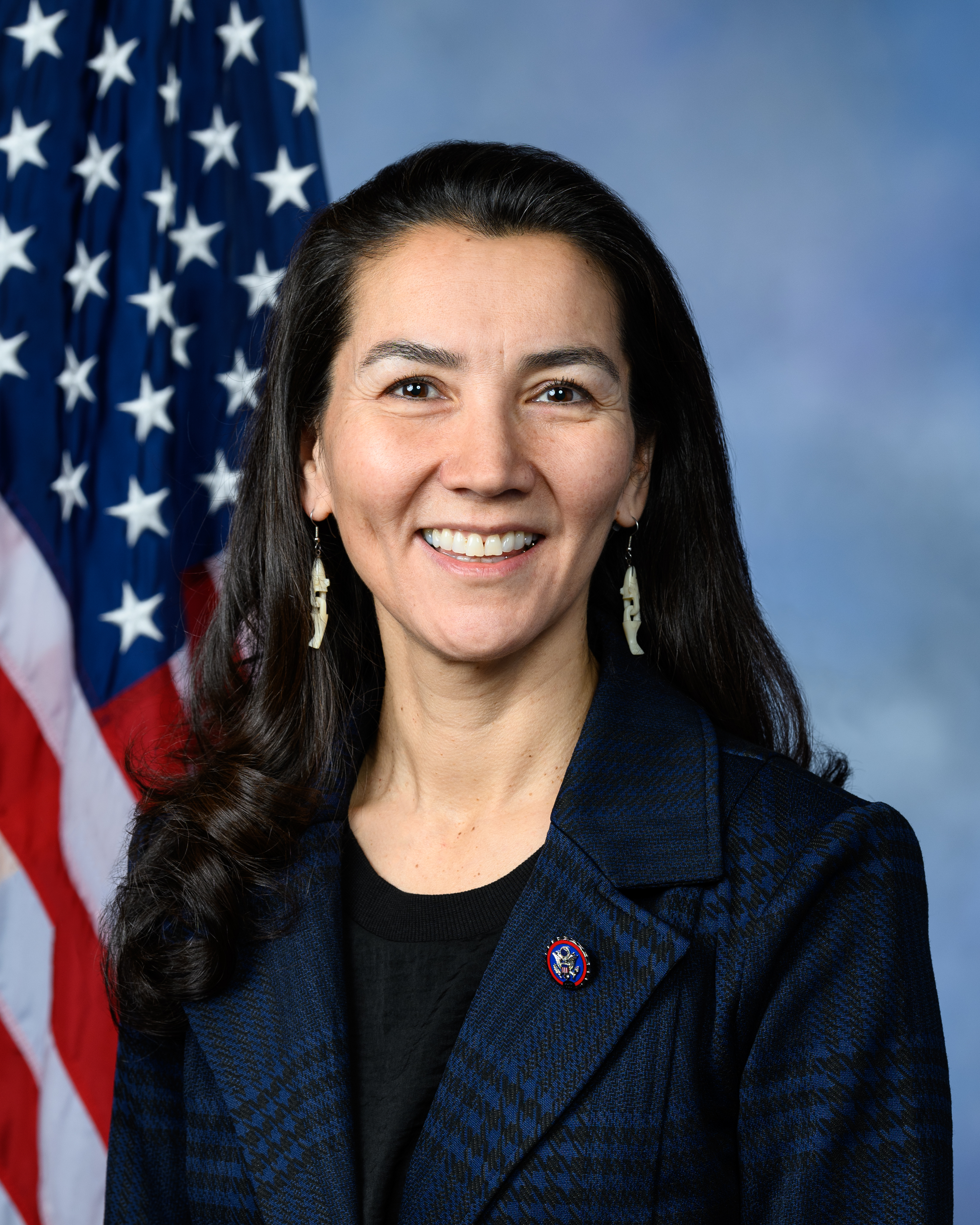
Mary Peltola

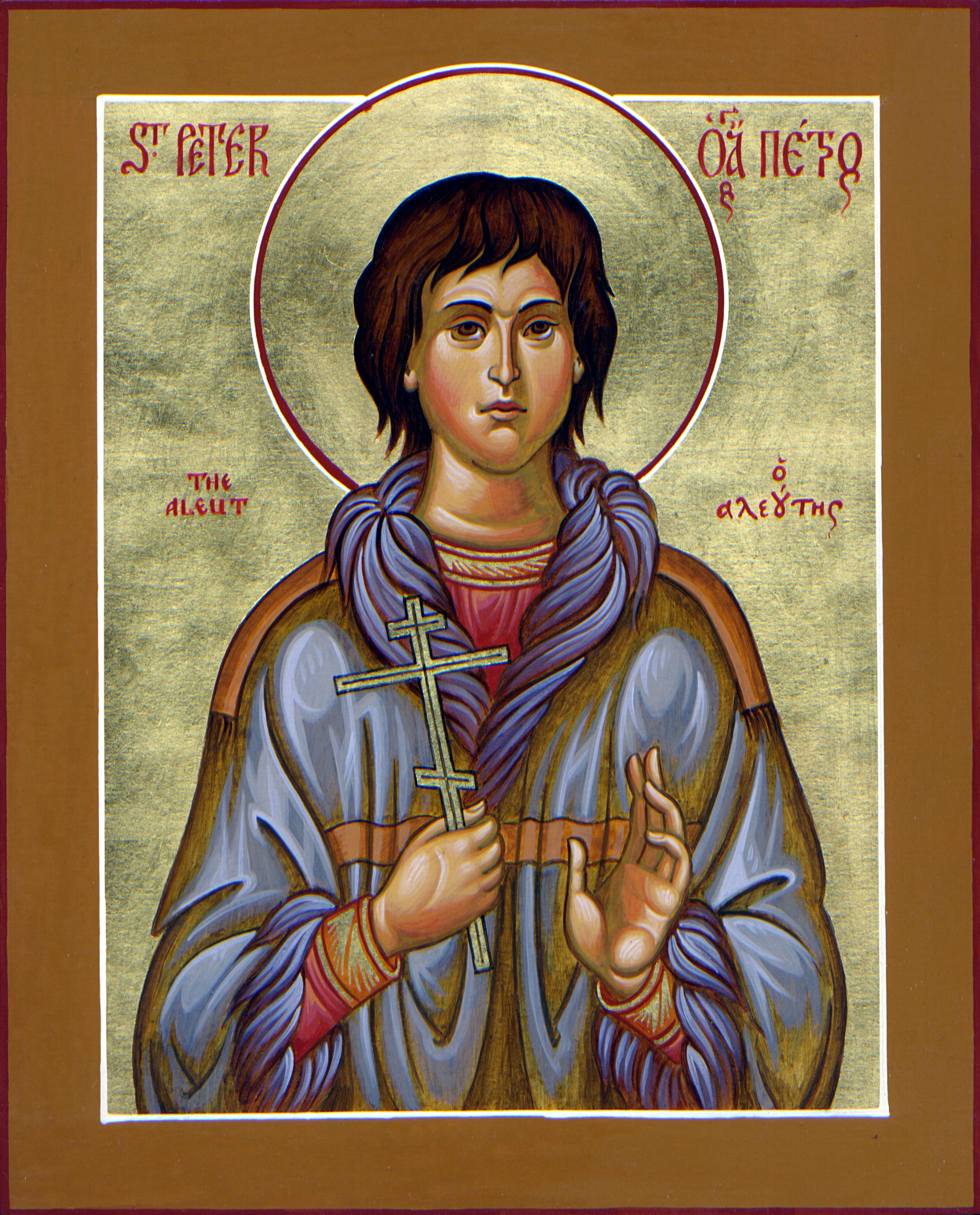
Peter the Aleut

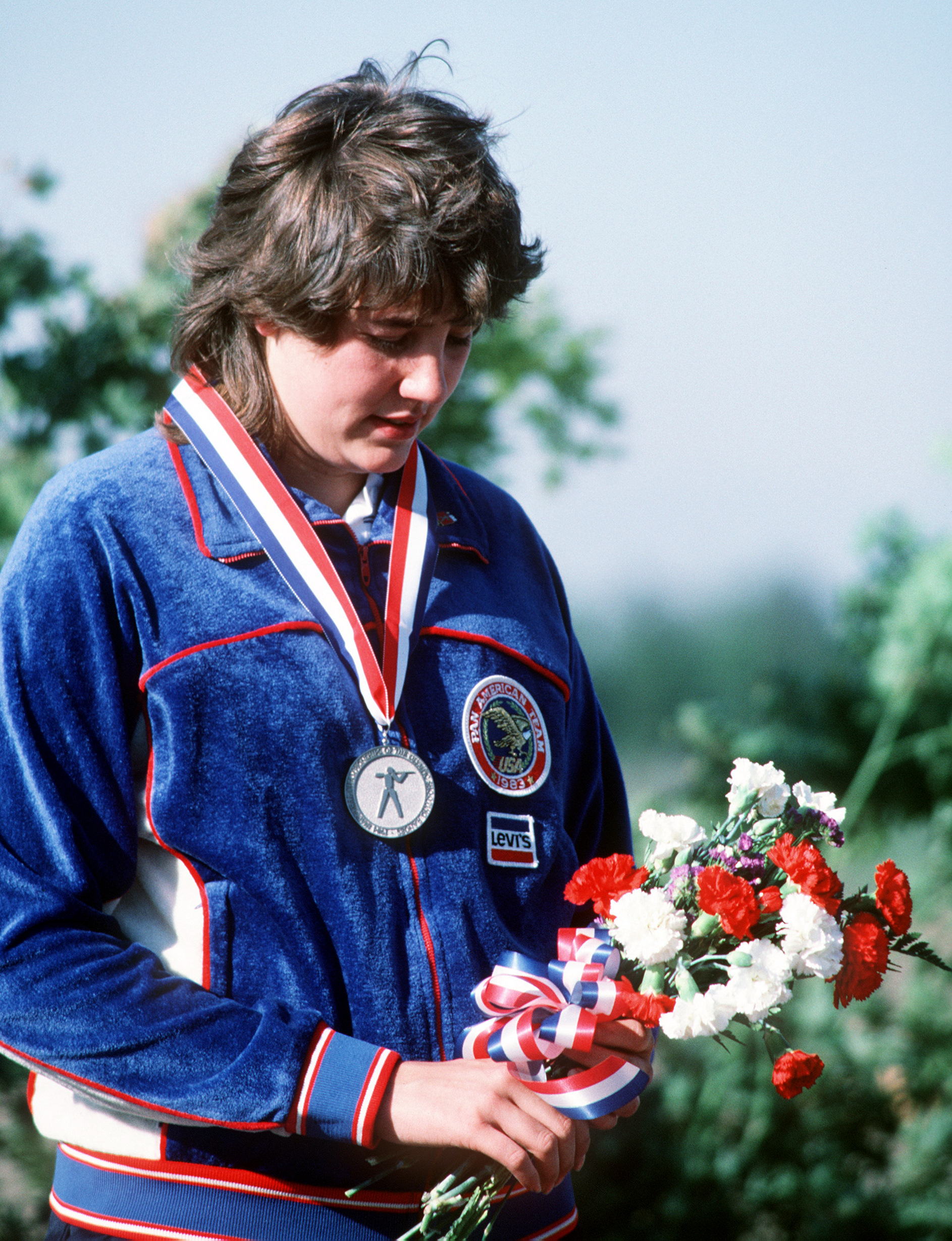
Pat Pitney

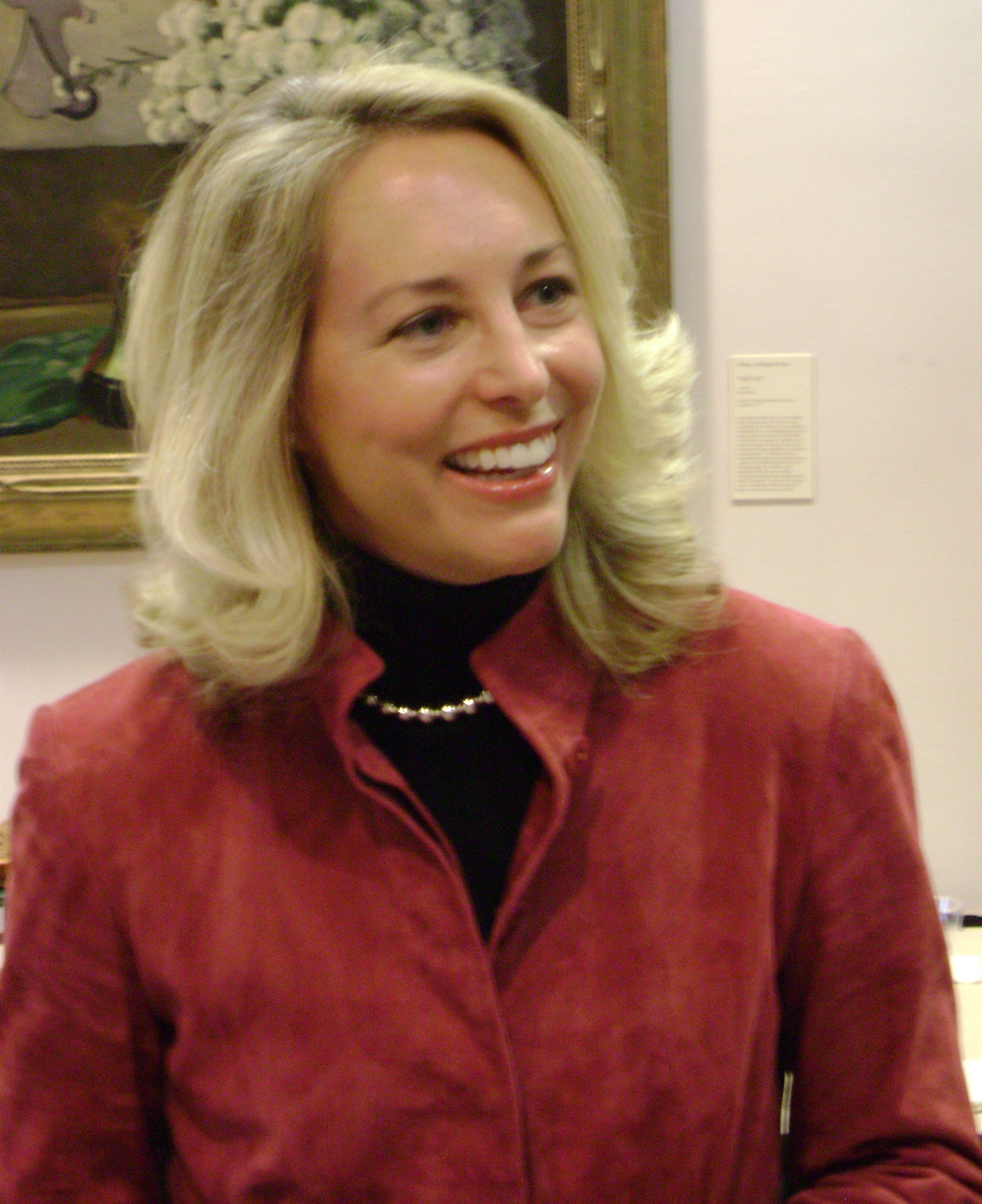
Valerie Plame

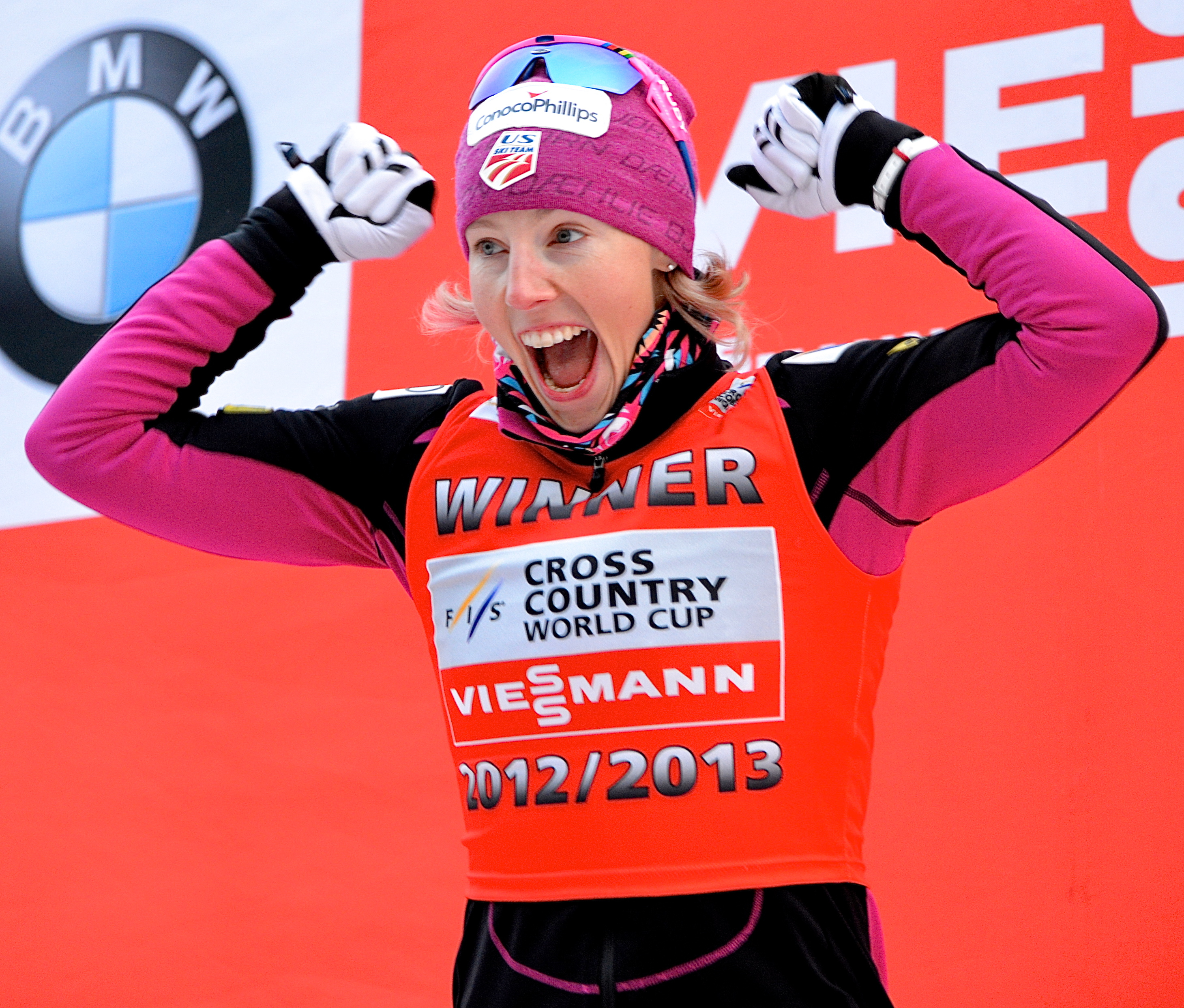
Kikkan Randall

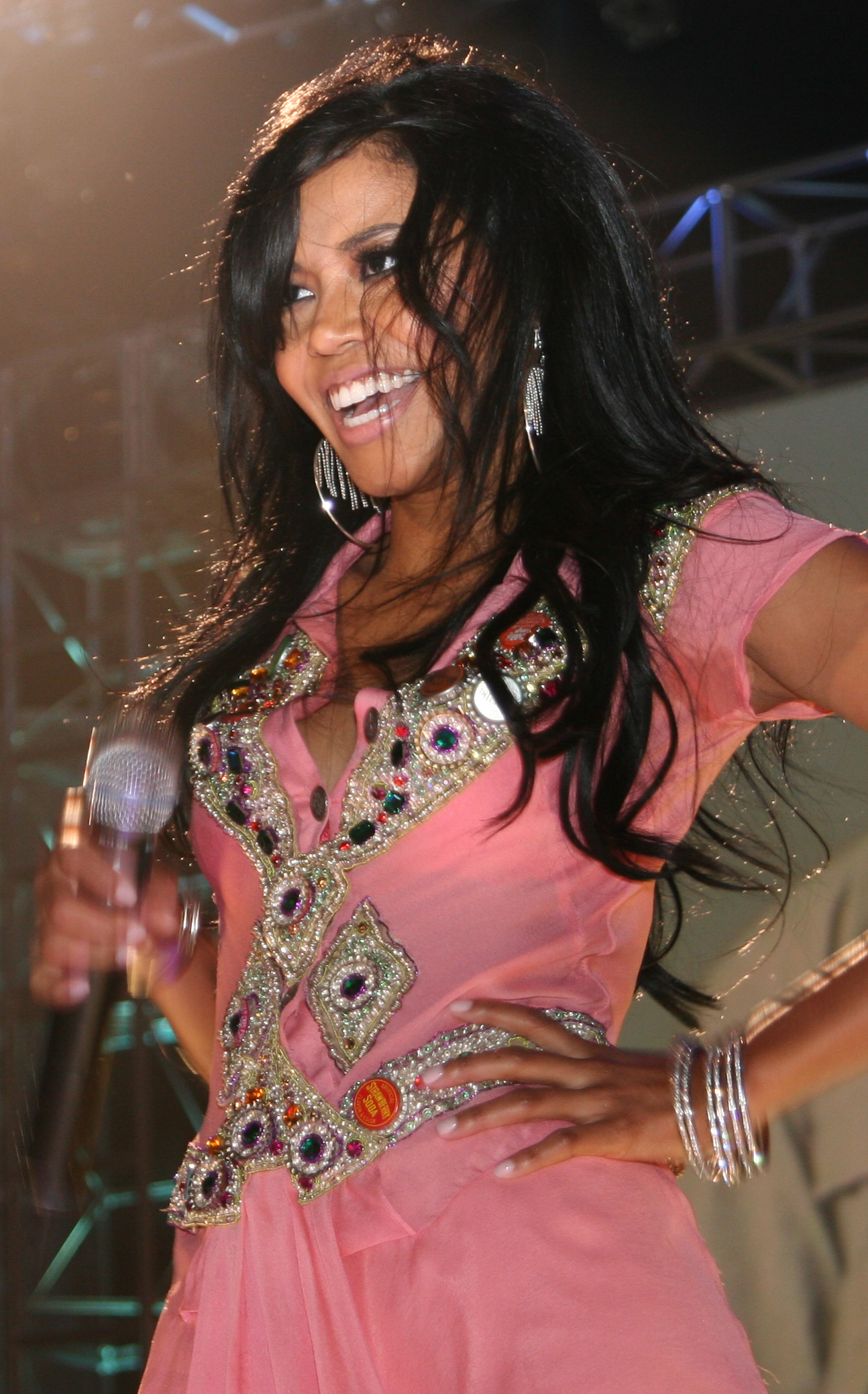
Amerie Rogers

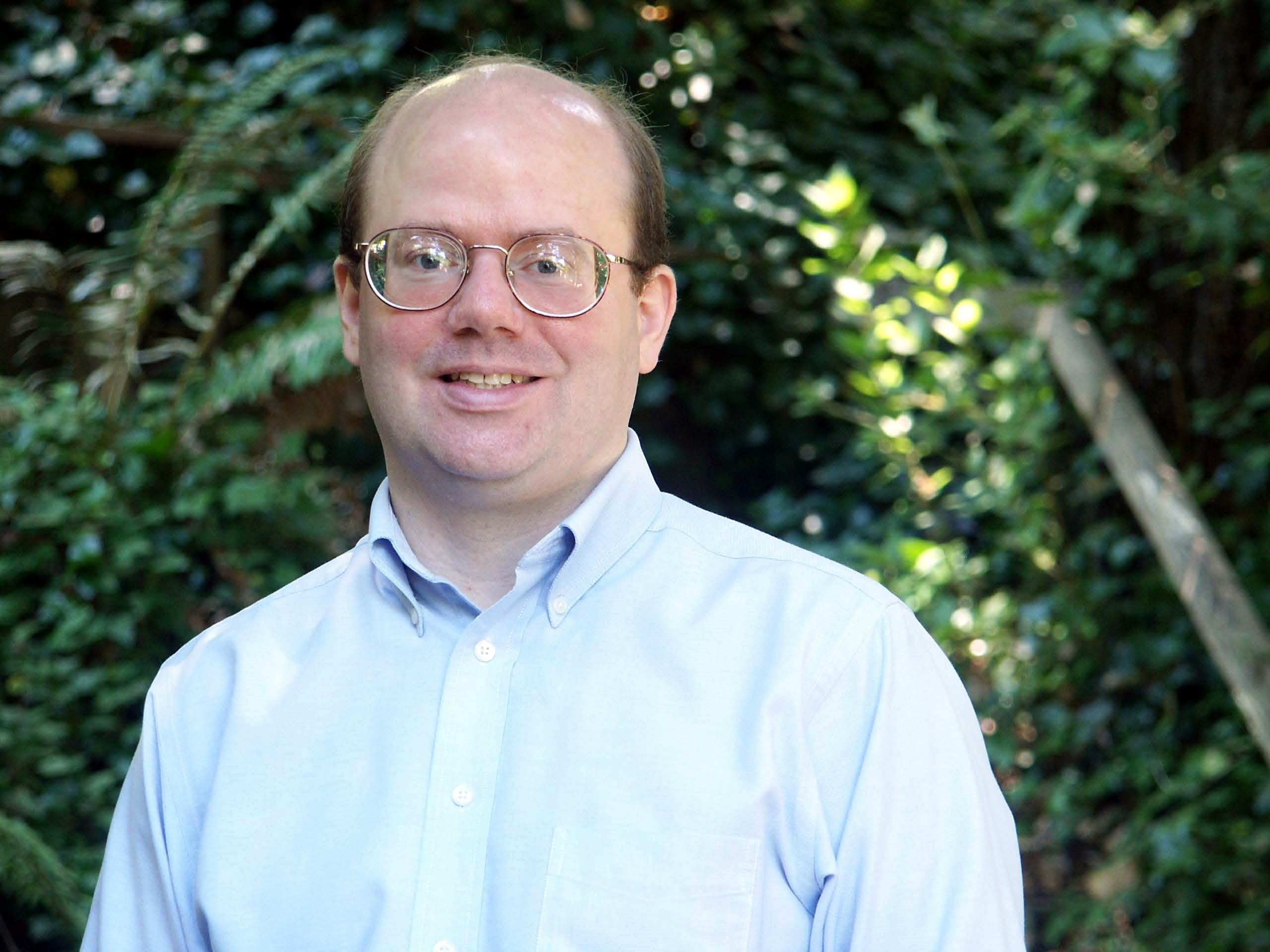
Larry Sanger

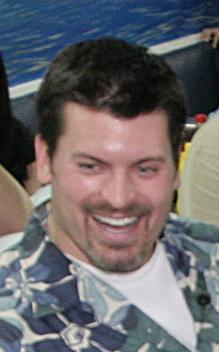
Mark Schlereth

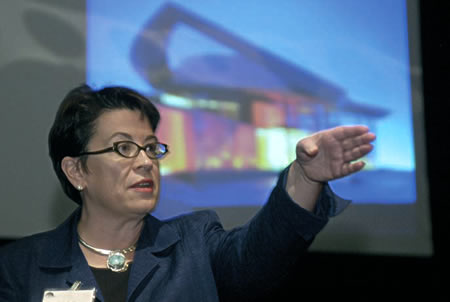
Molly Smith

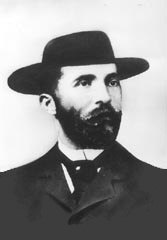
Soapy Smith

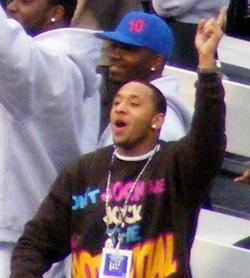
Steve Smith

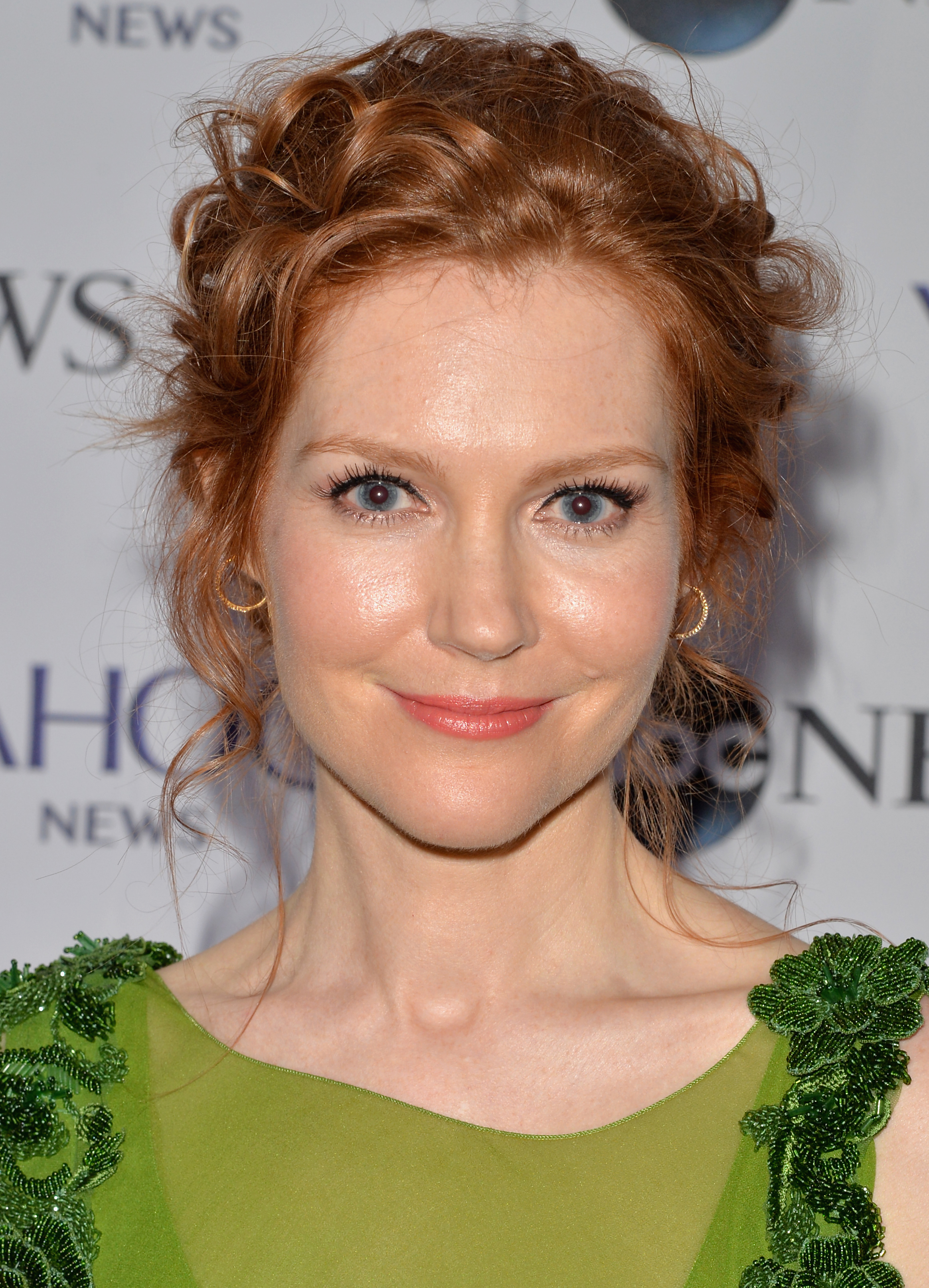
Darby Stanchfield

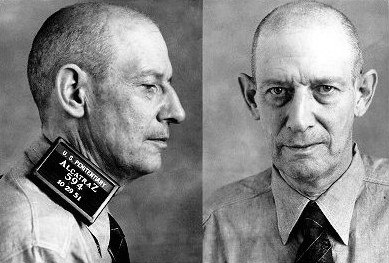
Robert Stroud

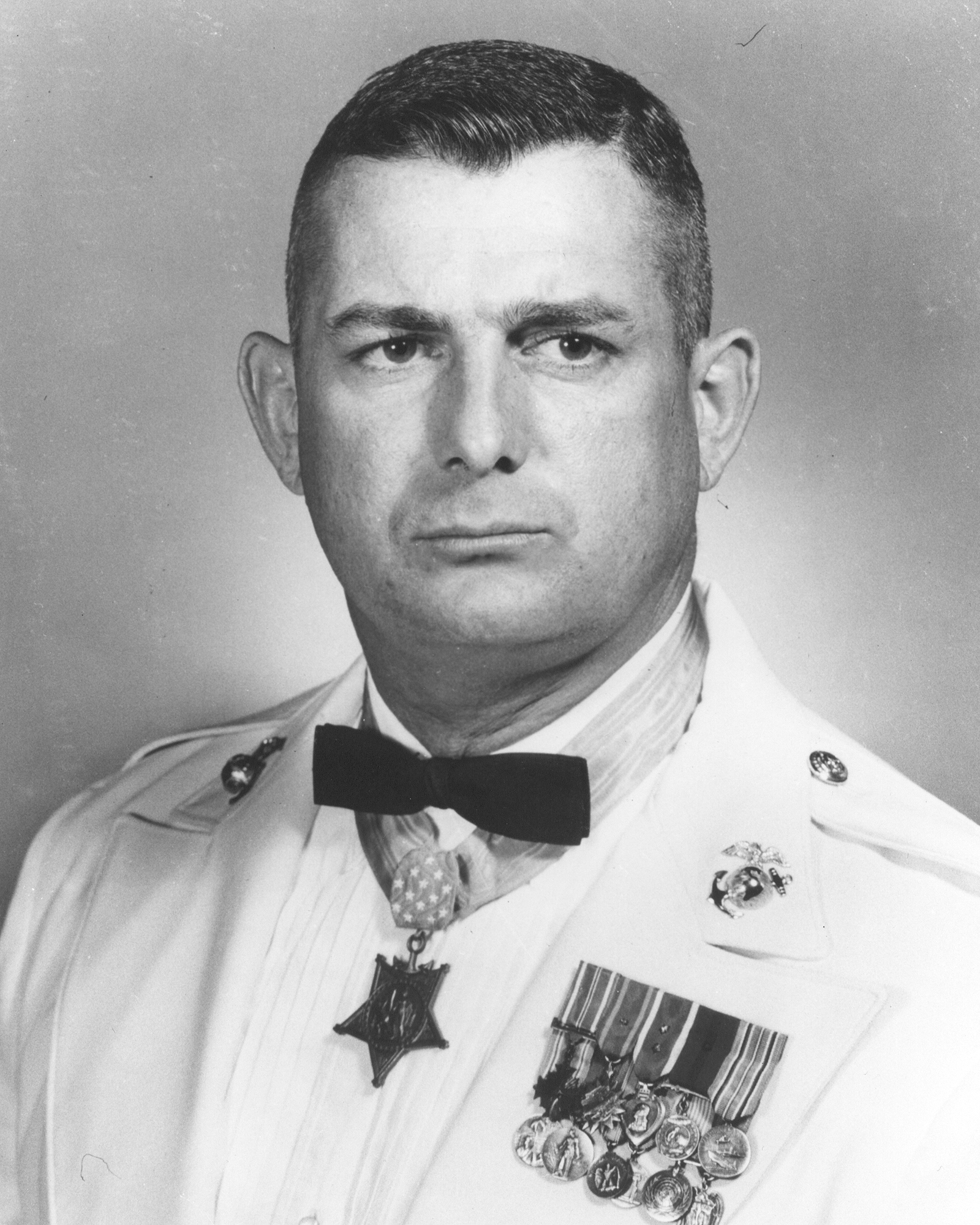
Archie Van Winkle

== A ==
John Luther Adams	1953	living	Fairbanks	classical music composer
Syun-Ichi Akasofu	1930	living	Fairbanks	geophysicist, aurora researcher, recently a participant in climate change debate
Baked Alaska	1987	living	Anchorage	white supremacist
Christian Allen	1976	living	Eagle River	video game designer
Alvin Eli Amason	1948	living	Fairbanks, Kodiak	painter, sculptor
Artis the Spoonman	1948	living	Kodiak	street musician, subject of the song by Soundgarden
Peter J. Aschenbrenner	1948	living	Fairbanks	author self-help legal books
Lena Atti	1926	2020	Kwigillingok	artist expert at traditional grass weaving

== B ==
Tony Barnette	1983	living	Anchorage	MLB player for the Texas Rangers
Laird Barron	1970	living	Palmer	sled dog racer, writer
Rex Beach	1877	1949	Nome, Rampart	writer; one of many participants in the Nome Gold Rush and related events who became famous elsewhere (see below for other examples)
Marty Beckerman	1983	living	Anchorage	writer
Irene Bedard	1967	living	Anchorage	actress; voice actor for Pocahontas
Mark Begich	1962	living	Anchorage	U.S. Senator from 2009 to 2015, Mayor from 2003 to 2009, son of Nick Begich Sr. and brother of Tom Begich
Tom Begich	1960	living	Anchorage	Former Minority Leader of the Alaska Senate, son of Nick Begich Sr. and brother of Mark Begich
Benny Benson	1913	1972	Chignik, Unalaska, Seward, Ugaiushak Island, Kodiak	designer of the Flag of Alaska
Chad Bentz	1980	living	Juneau, Seward	major league baseball pitcher
Bill Berry	1926	1979	Fairbanks	painter, cartoonist
Lydia Black	1925	2007	Fairbanks, Kodiak	anthropologist, linguist
Annalee Blysse				romance novelist
Tom Bodett	1955	living	Homer	writer, commentator, voice actor
Carlos Boozer	1981	living	Juneau	power forward for the Chicago Bulls who won an Olympic Bronze medal
Lincoln Brewster	1971	living	Fairbanks, Homer	musician, singer-songwriter
Justin Buchholz	1983	living	Fairbanks	mixed martial artist
Kira Buckland	1987	living	Anchorage	animation voice actress
David Bullock	1993	living	Anchorage	American tech entrepreneur and media executive
Martin Buser	1958	living	Big Lake	sled dog racer
Jon Butcher	1950	living	Clear	guitarist and songwriter best known for fronting 1980s band Jon Butcher Axis
Susan Butcher	1954	2006	Fairbanks, Wrangell Mountains	sled dog racer, four-time winner of the Iditarod Trail Sled Dog Race

== C ==
Marian Call	1982	living	Anchorage, Juneau	singer-songwriter
Matt Carle	1984	living	Anchorage	NHL hockey player
Chad Carpenter		living	Eagle River, Wasilla	cartoonist, creator of Tundra
William F. Cassidy	1908	2002	Nome	U.S. Army lieutenant general
Shawn Chacón	1977	living	Anchorage	Pittsburgh Pirates pitcher
Mario Chalmers	1986	living	Anchorage	Miami Heat point guard who won the 2011 3-point contest
Valentina Chepiga	1962	living	Anchorage	IFBB professional bodybuilder
Quinn Christopherson		living	Anchorage	singer-songwriter
Callan Chythlook-Sifsof	1989	living	Aleknagik, Girdwood	snowboarder, 2010 Olympics team member, Alaska Native activist
Corey Cogdell	1986	living	Anchorage	trapshooter, two-time Olympic bronze medal winner in the Women's Trap
Daryn Colledge	1982	living	North Pole	Miami Dolphins football player
Ty Conklin	1976	living	Anchorage	former professional hockey player
Robert Crawford	1899	1961	Fairbanks	early singer-songwriter, composer of "The U.S. Air Force"
Aaron Cunningham	1986	living	Anchorage	San Diego Padres outfielder

== D ==
Nora Marks Dauenhauer	1927	2017	Juneau	writer
T. Neil Davis	1932	2016	Fairbanks, North Pole	geophysicist, writer
Dale DeArmond	1914	2006	Juneau, Ketchikan, Pelican, Sitka	printmaker
R. N. DeArmond	1911	2010	Juneau, Ketchikan, Pelican, Sitka	historian, journalist, writer
Mahala Ashley Dickerson	1912	2007	Anchorage, Wasilla	lawyer, civil rights activist, mother of bodybuilder Chris Dickerson
Traci Dinwiddie	1973	living	Anchorage	actress
Buckwheat Donahue	1951	2019	Nome	folklorist
Jimmy Doolittle	1896	1993	Nome	World War II general and hero
Brandon Dubinsky	1986	living	Anchorage	professional ice hockey player
William Duncan	1832	1918	Metlakatla	Anglican lay missionary, brought a group of Tsimshian Indians from Canada to Annette Island, founding Metlakatla

== E ==
Kate Earl	1981	living	Anchorage, Chugiak	singer-songwriter
Carl Ben Eielson	1897	1929	Fairbanks	pioneering aviator

== F ==
Dana Fabe	1951	living	Anchorage	first female associate justice of the Alaska Supreme Court
Claire Fejes	1920	1998	Fairbanks	artist, writer
Rosey Fletcher	1975	living	Anchorage	Olympic snowboarder
Corey Flintoff	1946	living	Fairbanks	National Public Radio correspondent

== G ==
Vivica Genaux	1969	living	Fairbanks	opera singer
Ray Genet	1931	1979	Talkeetna	mountaineer, guide
Scott Gomez	1979	living	Anchorage	Florida Panthers hockey player
Katherine Gottlieb	ca. 1952	living	Anchorage, Old Harbor, Seldovia	president of Southcentral Foundation, MacArthur Fellow
John Gourley	1981	living	Willow	musician, lead singer of Portugal. The Man
Mike Gravel	1930	2021	Anchorage, Kenai Peninsula	U.S. Senator of Pentagon Papers fame
Kelsey Griffin	1987	living	Eagle River	basketball player for multiple teams in both the WNBA and Australian WNBL; also played for the Australia national team
Max Gruenberg	1943	2016	Juneau	member of the Alaska House of Representatives
Ernest Gruening	1887	1974	Juneau	journalist, writer, territorial governor, U.S. Senator

== H ==
John Haines	1924	2011	Big Delta, Fairbanks	poet, former Alaska poet laureate
Benjamin Haldane	1874	1941	Metlakatla	photographer
Travis Hall	1972	living	Soldotna	San Francisco 49ers football player
Walter Harper	1892	1918	Tanana	made the first recorded ascent of Denali
Richard Harris	1833	1907	Juneau	gold prospector, co-founder of Juneau
Ernestine Hayes	1945	living	Juneau	writer, professor
Ruthy Hebard	1998	living	Fairbanks	WNBA basketball player with the Chicago Sky
Willie Hensley	1941	living	Kotzebue, Anchorage	advocate for Alaska Native rights
Herman of Alaska	1756	1837	Kodiak Island	Orthodox saint
C. "Rusty" Heurlin	1895	1986	Barrow, Ester, Valdez	painter
Wally Hickel	1919	2010	Anchorage	industrialist, twice governor, U.S. Secretary of the Interior
Robin Hobb	1952	living	Kodiak	fantasy fiction writer
Sam Hoger	1980	living	Eagle River	mixed martial artist
Anna Kathryn Holbrook	1956	living	Fairbanks	television actress
Sven Holmberg	1918	2003	Fairbanks	film and television actor
Rick Holmstrom	1965	living	Fairbanks	blues guitarist and singer-songwriter
Steve Holt		living	Kenai	guitarist and backing vocalist for 36 Crazyfists

== J ==
Sheldon Jackson	1834	1909	Sitka	pioneering Presbyterian missionary, educator, reindeer herder
Lydia Jacoby	2004	living	Anchorage, Seward	swimmer, 2020 Summer Olympics team member
Kevin Johansen	1964	living	Fairbanks	Latin rock musician
Michelle Johnson	1965	living	Anchorage	actress
Levi Johnston	1990	living	Wasilla	former partner of Bristol Palin and celebrity news personality
Jennifer Jolly	1971	living	Kenai	consumer technology journalist and TV broadcaster
Marie Smith Jones	1918	2008	Anchorage, Cordova	last speaker of the Eyak language
DeeDee Jonrowe	1953	living	Anchorage, Fairbanks, Willow	sled dog racer
Joseph Juneau	1836	1899	Juneau	gold prospector, co-founder and namesake of Juneau

== K ==
Gunnar Kaasen	1882	1960	Nome	sled dog racer
Peter Kalifornsky	1911	1993	Kenai Peninsula	ethnographer, writer
Seth Kantner		living	Kobuk Valley, Kotzebue	writer
Joan Arend Kickbush	1926	2006	Anchorage	painter
Jewel Kilcher	1974	living	Homer	singer-songwriter, actress
Jeff King	1956	living	McKinley Park	sled dog racer
Sara King	1982	living	Fairbanks	writer
Tyler Kornfield	1991	living	Anchorage	Olympic cross-country skier
Michael E. Krauss	1934	2019	Fairbanks	linguist
Cy Kuckenbaker		living		filmmaker
Chris Kuper	1982	living	Anchorage	Denver Broncos offensive guard
Natalie Kusz	1962	living		memoirist
Randy Kutcher	1960	living	Anchorage	major league baseball outfielder

== L ==
Trajan Langdon	1976	living	Anchorage	retired basketball player, most notably the Cleveland Cavaliers and CSKA Moscow
Austin E. Lathrop	1865	1950	Anchorage, Cordova, Fairbanks, Valdez	businessman, one of the strongest Alaskan opponents of statehood
Sydney Laurence	1865	1940	Anchorage, Valdez, Talkeetna	landscape painter
Ernest Leffingwell	1875	1971	Flaxman Island	explorer and geologist
Hilary Lindh	1969	living	Juneau	alpine ski racer
Segundo Llorente	1906	1989	Alakanuk, Anchorage, Bethel, Cordova, Fairbanks, Kotzebue, Sheldon Point	Jesuit priest, elected to the Alaska House of Representatives in 1960, becoming the first Catholic priest to serve in a U.S. state legislature; also a widely published writer on Alaska in his native Spain

== M ==
Fred Machetanz	1908	2002	Palmer, Unalakleet	painter
Dick Mackey		living	Coldfoot	sled dog racer, early winner of the Iditarod Trail Sled Dog Race
Lance Mackey	1970	2022	Fairbanks, Fox	sled dog racer, four time Yukon Quest and four time Iditarod winner
Edna Ahgeak MacLean	1944	living	Utqiaġvik, Sitka, Anchorage, Fairbanks	an Iñupiaq linguist, anthropologist and educator specializing in the preservation and revitalization of the Iñupiaq language.
Holly Madison	1979	living	Craig	model, television personality
Ray Mala	1906	1952	Candle	actor, cinematographer
Andre Marrou	1938	living	Anchorage, Homer	the third Libertarian to be elected to a U.S. state legislature (all from Alaska to that point), later became the party's vice presidential and presidential nominee
Edward Marsden	1869	1932	Saxman, Metlakatla, Sitka	Tsimshian Presbyterian missionary and activist, first Alaska Native to be ordained
Robert Marshall	1901	1939	Wiseman	wilderness activist, writer; wrote Arctic Village about his experiences in Wiseman
Bristol Marunde	1982	living	Fairbanks	mixed martial artist
Jesse Marunde	1979	2007	Glennallen	strongman competitor
Carl McCunn	1946	1981	Anchorage	photographer, adventurer; committed suicide when stranded in the wilderness in northern Alaska
Mel McDaniel	1942	2011	Anchorage	country music singer-songwriter
Linious "Mac" McGee	1897	1988	Anchorage, Seward	pioneering aviator
Drew Meekins	1985	living	Juneau	pairs figure skater
Russel Merrill	1894	1929	Anchorage, Ketchikan	pioneering aviator
Dan Mintz	1981	living	Anchorage	comedian, writer, and actor
Tommy Moe	1970	living	Girdwood, Palmer, Wasilla	skier, gold medal winner at the 1994 Winter Olympics
Patricia Monaghan	1946	2012		poet, writer
Kelly Moneymaker	1970	living	Fairbanks	singer, most notably with Exposé
Shannyn Moore	1970	living	Homer	blogger, political activist
James Morrison	1954	living	Anchorage	actor, 24
Joshua Morrow	1974	living	Juneau	actor, singer
Margaret Murie	1902	2003	Fairbanks	"grandmother of the conservation movement"
Frank Murkowski	1933	living	Anchorage, Fairbanks, Ketchikan, Wrangell	U.S. Senator from 1981 to 2002, Governor from 2002 to 2006, father of Lisa Murkowski
Lisa Murkowski	1957	living	Anchorage, Fairbanks, Ketchikan, Wrangell	U.S. Senator who was reelected as a write-in candidate in 2010, daughter of Frank Murkowski

== N ==
Jacob Netsvetov	1802	1864	Atka, Sitka	Orthodox saint

== O ==
William Oefelein	1965	living	Anchorage	astronaut
Laurie Olin	1938	living		landscape architect
Norman Olson	1946	living	Nikiski	militia activist

- Rashard Odomes (born 1996), basketball player in the Israeli Basketball Premier League

== P ==
Dorothy Page	1921	1989	Wasilla	co-founder of the Iditarod Trail Sled Dog Race
Bristol Palin	1990	living	Wasilla	daughter of Sarah and Todd Palin, former contestant on Dancing with the Stars
Sarah Palin	1964	living	Eagle River, Skagway, Wasilla	youngest and first female governor, 2008 Republican nominee for U.S. vice president
Todd Palin	1964	living	Dillingham, Wasilla	ex-husband of Sarah Palin, champion snowmobile racer
Rudy Pankow	1998	living	Ketchikan, Alaska	actor, most notably on the Netflix original, Outer Banks.
Virgil Partch	1916	1984	St. Paul	cartoonist
William Paul	1885	1977	Tongass Village, Ketchikan, Sitka, Juneau	Native rights activist, first Alaska Native attorney
Mary Peltola	1973	living	Anchorage	U.S. Representative, former Member of the Alaska House of Representatives
Elizabeth Peratrovich	1911	1958	Juneau, Ketchikan, Klawock, Petersburg, Sitka	civil rights activist
Peter the Aleut		ca. 1815	Kodiak	Orthodox saint
Emmitt Peters	1940	2020	Ruby	sled dog racer, early winner of the Iditarod Trail Sled Dog Race
Pat Pitney	1965	living	Fairbanks, Juneau	president of the University of Alaska system, 1984 Olympic gold medalist
Valerie Plame	1963	living	Anchorage	spy, novelist, and CIA officer
Kirsten Powers	1969	living	Fairbanks	blogger, political commentator
Chanel Preston	1985	living	Fairbanks	pornographic actress

== R ==
Kikkan Randall	1982	living	Anchorage	Olympic gold medalist cross-country skier
Sean Rash	1982	living	Anchorage	professional tenpin bowler
Joe Redington	1917	1999	Knik	sled dog racer, co-founder of the Iditarod Trail Sled Dog Race
Robert Campbell Reeve	1902	1980	Anchorage, Valdez	pioneering aviator
Wilds P. Richardson	1861	1929	Valdez	Army officer, headed Alaska Roads Commission
Tex Rickard	1870	1929	Juneau, Nome	Old West figure, boxing promoter; lived in Nome during the height of its gold rush, served on the first city council
Libby Riddles	1956	living	Shaktoolik, Teller	sled dog racer, first woman to win the Iditarod Trail Sled Dog Race
Libby Roderick	ca. 1958	living	Anchorage	journalist, singer-songwriter, writer
Amerie Rogers	1981	living	Anchorage	pop singer
Paul Rosenthal	1942	living	Juneau	violinist, founder of the Sitka Summer Music Festival
Peter Trimble Rowe	1856	1942	Sitka	Episcopal bishop
Jason Ryznar	1983	living	Anchorage	professional ice hockey player

== S ==
Larry Sanger	1968	living	Anchorage	co-founder of Wikipedia
Curt Schilling	1966	living	Anchorage	professional baseball player
Daniel Schlereth	1986	living	Anchorage	professional baseball player
Mark Schlereth	1966	living	Anchorage	professional football player, analyst for ESPN
Brian Schmidt	1967	living	Anchorage	astrophysicist, 2011 Nobel Prize laureate in Physics
Mitch Seavey	1959	living	Seward, Sterling	sled dog racer
Charles John Seghers	1839	1886	Juneau, Nulato, Sitka	pioneering Catholic missionary
Ronald Senungetuk	1933	2020	Fairbanks, Homer, Wales	silversmith, sculptor
Leonhard Seppala	1877	1967	Fairbanks, Nome	sled dog racer, key musher in the 1925 serum run to Nome
Tom Sexton	1940	living	Anchorage, Fairbanks	Alaska poet laureate
Don Simpson	1943	1996	Anchorage	film producer
Peter Simpson	1871	1947	Metlakatla, Sitka	Native rights activist and boatbuilder
Jamie Smith	ca. 1965	living	Fairbanks	cartoonist, printmaker
Molly Smith		living	Douglas	theater director
Soapy Smith	1860	1898	Skagway	con artist, gangster
Steve Smith	1985	living	Anchorage	professional football player
Dana Stabenow	1952	living	Anchorage, Seldovia	writer
Darby Stanchfield	1971	living	Kodiak, Unalaska	television actress
Ben Stevens	1959	living	Anchorage, Fairbanks, Girdwood	Chief of Staff to the Governor of Alaska, Alaskan State Senate President
Ted Stevens	1923	2010	Anchorage, Fairbanks, Girdwood	longest-serving U.S. Senator from Alaska, Pres. pro tempore of U.S. Senate, father of Ben Stevens.
John Strohmeyer	1924	2010	Anchorage	Pulitzer Prize-winning journalist; professor at University of Alaska Anchorage, author of Extreme Conditions
John F. A. Strong	1856	1929	Iditarod, Juneau, Katalla, Nome, Skagway	founder of what is now Juneau Empire, territorial governor
Robert Stroud	1890	1963	Juneau	convicted killer known as "The Birdman of Alcatraz"
Stephen Sundborg	1943	living		president of Seattle University
Jeremy Swayman	1998	living	Anchorage	ice hockey goaltender
Rick Swenson	1950	living	Manley Hot Springs, Two Rivers	sled dog racer
Jim Sykes	1950	living	Anchorage, Palmer, Talkeetna	Green Party politician

== T ==
Khleo Thomas	1989	living	Anchorage	actor, rapper
Phoebe Thomas	2004	living	Kenai	Former child
Lowell Thomas Jr.	1923	2016	Anchorage, Talkeetna	son of and collaborator with Lowell Thomas; bush pilot, film maker, lecturer, politician, writer
Morris Thompson	1939	2000	Fairbanks, Tanana	Alaska Native leader, business executive
Nate Thompson	1984	living	Anchorage	professional ice hockey player
Ray Troll	1954	living	Ketchikan	artist, musician
Kelly Tshibaka	1979	living	Palmer	Attorney and politician

== U ==
Rachel Uchitel	1975	living	Anchorage	media personality; her father was an Anchorage business magnate of the 1970s and 1980s who founded Anchorage's cable television system

== V ==
Archie Van Winkle	1925	1986	Juneau, Ketchikan	Korean War hero
Paul Varelans	1969	2021	Fairbanks	mixed martial artist
Norman D. Vaughan	1905	2005	Eagle River, Trapper Creek	explorer, dog musher
Joe Vogler	1913	1993	Fairbanks, Kodiak	gold miner and secessionist advocate, became folk hero following his murder

== W ==
Jujiro Wada	ca. 1872	1937	Barrow, Fairbanks, Nome	adventurer
Velma Wallis	1960	living	Fairbanks, Fort Yukon	writer
Nathan West	1978	living	Anchorage	actor
Mr. Whitekeys	1947	living	Fairbanks, Spenard	writer, musician, commentator, satirist
James Wickersham	1857	1939	Eagle, Fairbanks, Juneau	judge and congressional delegate in the district and territory, made an early recorded ascent of Mount McKinley, compiled an important early bibliography of Alaska
Noel Wien	1899	1977		pioneering aviator
Lael Wilcox		living	Anchorage	ultra-endurance bicycle racer
Dave Williams	1979	living	Anchorage	professional baseball player
Barrett Willoughby	1901	1959		writer
Charles Wood	1916	1978	Iditarod, Kodiak	singer and actor in Broadway musicals
Roger L. Worsley	1937	living	Anchorage	educator; vice-chancellor University of Alaska Anchorage, 1978–1985
Hugh Wade	1901	1995		first secretary of state of Alaska

== Y ==
S. Hall Young	1847	1927	Fairbanks, Fort Wrangel	Presbyterian missionary, wilderness companion of John Muir

== People associated with Alaska ==
- Edward Albee (1928–2016), main person responsible for building the Last Frontier Theatre Conference in Valdez to the status it has currently achieved
- Henry Tureman Allen (1859–1930), U.S. Army officer who conducted a famous expedition of Alaska's interior in 1885, largely through the Copper and Tanana River drainages
- Roald Amundsen (1872–1928), frequently passed through Alaska in his travels
- Hubert Howe Bancroft (1832–1918), whose 19th-century published history of Alaska, part of a larger series, formed an important foundation for later study of Alaskan history
- Alexander Baranof (1746–1819)
- Vitus Bering (1681–1741), made the first recorded European sighting of Alaska
- Hale Boggs (1914–1972), member of the U.S. House from Louisiana, who disappeared on a flight in Alaska along with freshman colleague Nick Begich while helping Begich campaign for reelection
- Jackson Browne (born 1948), stated in a 1980s interview that he was conceived in Alaska, while his father was stationed there in the U.S. military
- Simon Bolivar Buckner Jr. (1886–1945), military commander of Alaska early in World War II
- Sydney Chapman (1888–1970), mathematician and geophysicist; Advisory Scientific Director of the Geophysical Institute at the University of Alaska from 1951 until his death, where he was largely responsible for building the programs and reputation of the Institute in its early years
- James Cook (1728–1779), British explorer whose voyages included several trips along Alaska's coastline
- William Healey Dall (1845–1927), biologist, hydrographer; explored interior Alaska, charted the Aleutians; America's pre-eminent authority on Alaska 1866–1900
- Brad Davis (born 1955), played briefly for the Anchorage Northern Knights before going on to a long career with the Dallas Mavericks, both as a player and in other capacities
- Edna Ferber (1885–1968), friend of Ernest Gruening; following the success of Giant, was convinced by Gruening to write Ice Palace as a tool to promote Alaskan statehood
- Joseph Hazelwood (born 1946), captain of the Exxon Valdez when it ran aground and spilled oil in 1989
- Michael A. Healy (1839–1904), captain of the USRC Corwin and USRC Bear when they were the only law enforcement presence north of Sitka
- Eric Holmback (1924–1965), professional wrestler of the 1950s and 1960s known as "Yukon Eric," was billed (declared by the promoter and/or ring announcer as hailing) from Fairbanks. Other wrestlers, such as Jay York (who was also briefly a member of the rock group Delaney & Bonnie) and King Kong Bundy (while wrestling in Texas during the early 1980s), also portrayed wrestling personas associated with Alaska.
- Michio Hoshino (1952–1996), photographer
- Jack London (1876–1916), writer
- Christopher McCandless (1968–1992), hiker, ad hoc adventurer
- John Muir (1838–1914), writer, explorer, naturalist; made and wrote about several trips to Alaska; explored Glacier Bay
- Wiley Post (1898–1935), aviator who died in a plane crash in Alaska along with Will Rogers (see below) while making a flight through the territory
- Ralph Regula (1924–2017), longtime member of the U.S. House representing Canton, Ohio, the hometown of William McKinley. Regula devoted much of his career to preserving McKinley's legacy, and maintained a decades–long effort in Congress to prevent the renaming of Mount McKinley to its native name Denali.
- Will Rogers (1879–1935), actor and humorist, died in a plane crash in Alaska along with Wiley Post while making a flight through the territory
- Robert W. Service (1874–1958), due to influence from Gold Rush migration across the North Country, Service became Alaskans' most well–loved poet, despite actually living in the Yukon Territory.
- Vilhjalmur Stefansson (1879–1962), frequently passed through Alaska in his travels
- Timothy Treadwell (1957–2003), bear enthusiast
- Naomi Uemura (1941–1984), adventurer, mountain climber, died while attempting a solo ascent of Mount McKinley
- Bradford Washburn (1910–2007), mountaineer, geographer
- Cal Worthington (1920–2013), purchased Anchorage dealership Friendly Ford in 1976 and renamed it Cal Worthington Ford, which his company still owns and operates along with other Anchorage dealerships. He has been a ubiquitous figure on Anchorage television for decades, as well as the subject of parodies and other cultural depictions originating from Alaska.

== See also ==
=== Elected officials ===
- List of governors of Alaska
- List of lieutenant governors of Alaska
- List of mayors of Anchorage, Alaska
- List of mayors of Cordova, Alaska
- List of mayors of Fairbanks, Alaska
- List of mayors of Juneau, Alaska
- List of speakers of the Alaska House of Representatives
- List of United States senators from Alaska
- Alaska's congressional delegations

=== Others ===
- List of Alaskan aviators
- List of Alaska suffragists
- List of Alaskan Hall of Fame pilots
- List of athletes from Alaska
- List of justices of the Alaska Supreme Court
