= New Boston, Juneau =

Coordinates: 58°18′00″N 134°27′00″W

New Boston (or Union City) was a historical populated place in Juneau, Alaska. It was located one mile west of the city of Juneau, on Douglas Island; according to R. N. DeArmond, it was a short-lived town.
