= List of Alaskan Hall of Fame pilots =

Following is an alphabetical list of inductees into the Alaska Aviation Heritage Museum's Alaska Aviation Hall of Fame.

- Arthur Gordon "Art" Woodley – Alaska Aviation Hall of Fame
- Bob and Marge Baker - Alaska Aviation Hall of Fame, 2021 Aviation Entrepreneur
- Carl Benjamin "Ben" Eielson (1897–1929) – Alaska Aviation Hall of Fame; National Aviation Hall of Fame
- Hans Roald Amundsen - Alaska Aviation Hall of Fame, 2019 Aviation Entrepreneur
- Jim Jansen - Alaska Aviation Hall of Fame, 2019 Lifetime Achievement
- Joseph E. "Joe" Crosson (1903–1949) – Alaska Aviation Hall of Fame
- Leon "Babe" Alsworth - Alaska Aviation Hall of Fame, 2019 Explorer and Pathfinder
- Merle K. "Mudhole" Smith (1907–1981) – Alaska Aviation Hall of Fame; OX-5 Aviation Pioneers Hall of Fame
- Noel Wien (1899–1977) – Alaska Aviation Hall of Fame; OX-5 Aviation Pioneers Hall of Fame; Minnesota Aviation Hall of Fame
- Raymond Ingvard "Ray" Petersen (1912–2008) – Alaska Aviation Hall of Fame
- Robert Campbell "Bob" Reeve (1902–1980) – Alaska Aviation Hall of Fame; National Aviation Hall of Fame; International Aerospace Hall of Fame; Wisconsin Aviation Hall of Fame
- Robert E. "Bob" Ellis (1903–1994) – Alaska Aviation Hall of Fame
- Ron Sheardown - Alaska Aviation Hall of Fame, 2021 Explorer and Pathfinder
- Ruth M. Jefford (1914–2007) – Alaska Aviation Hall of Fame
- Russel Hyde "Russ" Merrill (1894–1929) – Alaska Aviation Hall of Fame
- Ted Stevens - Alaska Aviation Hall of Fame, 2021 Lifetime Achievement

== See also ==
- List of people from Alaska
- List of aviators
