= Pelican School District =

School district in Alaska, United States

Address
- 14 Chum Way Pelican, Alaska, 99832; United States

District information
- Type: Public
- Grades: K–12
- NCES District ID: 0200630

Students and staff
- Students: 12
- Teachers: 2
- Staff: 3.0
- Student–teacher ratio: 6.00

Other information
- Website: pelicanschool.org

Pelican School District is a school district headquartered in Pelican, Alaska. It operates a single K-12 school.

In 1999 the school had 30 students. Beginning circa 1999 the Anchorage company Education Resources Inc. was scheduled to enter a contract with the district to provide management services. As of the 2017–2018 school year, the school had 8 students.

Pelican School Enrollment
Year	Enrollment
2001	23
2002	17
2003	18
2004	15
2005	12
2006	14
2007	14
2008	16
2009	15
2010	13
2011	12
2012	18
2013	17
2014	13
2015	13
2016	14
2017	10
2018	8
