= Dale DeArmond =

American printmaker and book illustrator (1914–2006)

- Dale in her basement printshop, 1977
- Born: July 2, 1914; Bismarck, North Dakota
- Died: November 21, 2006 (aged 92); Sitka, Alaska
- Known for: printmaker, book illustrator
- Spouse: R. N. DeArmond

Dale Burlison DeArmond (July 2, 1914 – November 21, 2006) was an American printmaker and book illustrator.

== Life ==
Dale F. Burlison was born in Bismarck, North Dakota, and met Robert Neil DeArmond, a native of Sitka, Alaska, while they were classmates at Stadium High School in Tacoma, Washington. They married on July 29, 1935, and lived on a troller in Sitka. In 1938, they moved to Pelican, then to Ketchikan in 1944 and back to Sitka in 1949. They had a son and a daughter.

Her first printed illustration was for the Sitka Printing Company in 1949. In 1953, the DeArmonds moved to Juneau, where her husband was executive assistant to territorial governor B. Frank Heintzleman. She worked for the Alaska Territorial Library, then for the Juneau city library, where she was director from 1958 to 1979. They moved to the Sitka Pioneer Home in 1991, where they remained. DeArmond died in Sitka, Alaska.

DeArmond mostly worked in ink and pencil illustrations and oils - something she was unhappy with - until she took a woodcutting workshop with Wisconsin artist Danny Pierce (artist) in 1960. She never completed another oil painting again, working solely in woodcuts for a number of years. In 1975, she traveled with fellow Alaskan artists Rie Munoz and Diana Tillion to France, where she published a number of stone lithograph prints. She continued to dabble in other mediums, including several silkscreens and etchings - a short-lived endeavor as she disliked the caustic materials necessary for these prints. After experiencing difficulties with carving the blocks for her woodcut prints, she took a wood engraving class in 1978. This was her preferred medium until she retired from printmaking in 1999.

== Exhibitions ==
- 2008, "Dale DeArmond: Nondalton Legends"
- 2009 "Recent Acquisitions '06-08", Juneau-Douglas City Museum

== Bibliography ==
- Juneau; A Book of Woodcuts, Alaska Northwest Pub. Co., 1973, ISBN 978-0-88240-021-1
- Raven: A Collection of Woodcuts, Alaska Northwest Publishing Co. 1975.; Graphic Arts Center, 1986, ISBN 978-0-88240-309-0
- R. N. DeArmond (1978). Early Visitors to Southeastern Alaska: Nine Accounts. Illustrator Dale DeArmond. Alaska Northwest Pub. Co. ISBN 978-0-88240-116-4.
- Dale De Armond: a First Book Collection of Her Prints, Alaska Northwest Pub. Co., 1979, ISBN 978-0-88240-131-7
- Berry Woman's Children, Greenwillow Books, 1985, ISBN 978-0-688-05814-2
- The First Man, Old Harbor Press, 1990, ISBN 978-0-9615529-6-1
- The Boy Who Found the Light: Eskimo folktales, Sierra Club Books, 1990, ISBN 978-0-316-17787-0
- Sun Signs from a Polar Star: A Northern Zodiac, Old Harbor Press, 1993, ISBN 978-1-881655-02-2
- Frederica De Laguna (1995). Tales from the Dena: Indian Stories from the Tanana, Koyukuk, & Yukon rivers. Illustrator Dale DeArmond. University of Washington Press. ISBN 978-0-295-97435-4.
- The Seal Oil Lamp. Gibbs Smith. 1996. ISBN 978-0-87156-858-8.
- Tales from the Four Winds of the North: Alaska Native Folktales, LapCat Pub., 1996, ISBN 978-0-9641998-3-5
- The True Story of the Discovery of Gold at Bonanza Creek, LapCat Pub., 1997. Based on a Tlingit legend by Dr. Frederica de Laguna. Illustrator Dale DeArmond. ISBN 978-0-9641998-5-9
- The Raven Charm, LapCat Pub., 1998, ISBN 978-0-9641998-6-6
