= Pelican, Alaska =

Pelican, Alaska K'udeis'x̱'e
- City
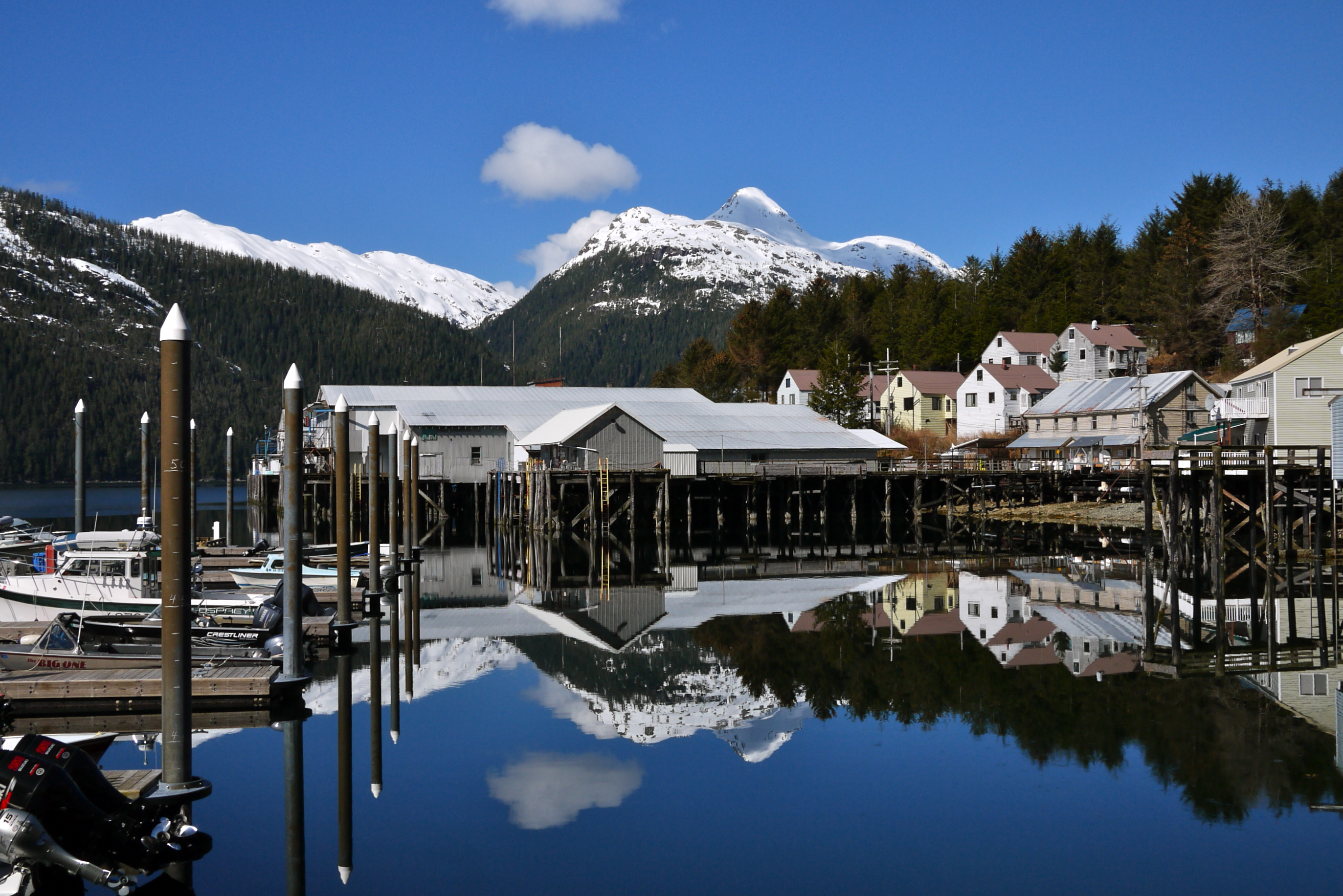
- Motto: "Closest to the fish"
- Location in Alaska
- Coordinates: 57°57′30″N 136°13′27″W
- Country: United States
- State: Alaska
- Census Area: Hoonah-Angoon
- Incorporated: October 3, 1943

Government
  - Mayor: Barry Bryant
  - State senator: Bert Stedman (R)
  - State rep.: Rebecca Himschoot (I)

Area
  - Total: 0.61 sq mi (1.59 km^{2})
  - Land: 0.55 sq mi (1.42 km^{2})
  - Water: 0.066 sq mi (0.17 km^{2})
- Elevation: 217 ft (66 m)

Population (2020)
  - Total: 98
  - Density: 178.6/sq mi (68.96/km^{2})
- Time zone: UTC-9 (Alaska (AKST))
  - Summer (DST): UTC-8 (AKDT)
- ZIP code: 99832
- Area code: 907
- FIPS code: 02-59650
- GNIS feature ID: 1424201
- Website: cityofpelican.com

Pelican (Tlingit: K'udeis'x̱'e) is a small town in the northwestern part of Chichagof Island in Hoonah-Angoon Census Area in the U.S. state of Alaska. Pelican was founded in 1938 by fish buyer Charlie Raatikainen who established the town as a business venture to support his fish processing company.

As of the 2010 census, the population of the city was 88, down from 163 at the 2000 census. As of the newest 2020 census, Pelican has a total population of 98 people.

== Geography ==
Pelican is located on the east side of Lisianski Inlet, a body of water that opens into Lisianski Strait and Cross Sound, on Chichagof Island at coordinates 57°57′30″N 136°13′27″W (57.958431, -136.224069).

The only way to get to Pelican is by boat or sea plane. Juneau is the nearest city located on the mainland.

According to the United States Census Bureau, the city has a total area of 0.73 square miles (1.9 km^{2}), of which 0.62 square miles (1.6 km^{2}) are land and 0.1 square miles (0.3 km^{2}), or 16.25%, are water.

== Climate ==
According to the Köppen climate classification system, Pelican has a humid continental climate (Dfb).

Climate data for Pelican, Alaska, (1991–2020 normals, extremes 1967–present)
Month	Jan	Feb	Mar	Apr	May	Jun	Jul	Aug	Sep	Oct	Nov	Dec	Year
Record high °F (°C)	57 (14)	53 (12)	60 (16)	76 (24)	81 (27)	87 (31)	84 (29)	92 (33)	76 (24)	68 (20)	61 (16)	52 (11)	92 (33)
Mean maximum °F (°C)	45.6 (7.6)	45.8 (7.7)	49.9 (9.9)	60.4 (15.8)	70.5 (21.4)	73.4 (23.0)	72.8 (22.7)	74.0 (23.3)	68.1 (20.1)	57.9 (14.4)	49.1 (9.5)	45.8 (7.7)	78.1 (25.6)
Mean daily maximum °F (°C)	35.4 (1.9)	37.5 (3.1)	39.9 (4.4)	47.7 (8.7)	54.4 (12.4)	59.5 (15.3)	60.4 (15.8)	61.5 (16.4)	56.8 (13.8)	48.2 (9.0)	40.0 (4.4)	36.1 (2.3)	48.1 (8.9)
Daily mean °F (°C)	31.4 (−0.3)	32.8 (0.4)	34.4 (1.3)	40.5 (4.7)	46.7 (8.2)	52.4 (11.3)	55.1 (12.8)	55.8 (13.2)	51.2 (10.7)	43.3 (6.3)	36.0 (2.2)	32.8 (0.4)	42.7 (5.9)
Mean daily minimum °F (°C)	27.5 (−2.5)	28.0 (−2.2)	28.9 (−1.7)	33.3 (0.7)	39.1 (3.9)	45.3 (7.4)	49.8 (9.9)	50.2 (10.1)	45.5 (7.5)	38.5 (3.6)	32.0 (0.0)	29.6 (−1.3)	37.3 (2.9)
Mean minimum °F (°C)	12.8 (−10.7)	15.0 (−9.4)	16.3 (−8.7)	25.1 (−3.8)	31.7 (−0.2)	37.9 (3.3)	43.9 (6.6)	43.4 (6.3)	35.5 (1.9)	29.5 (−1.4)	21.5 (−5.8)	18.4 (−7.6)	7.8 (−13.4)
Record low °F (°C)	−3 (−19)	−2 (−19)	5 (−15)	15 (−9)	23 (−5)	29 (−2)	38 (3)	33 (1)	27 (−3)	15 (−9)	3 (−16)	−1 (−18)	−3 (−19)
Average precipitation inches (mm)	13.34 (339)	12.20 (310)	11.13 (283)	9.18 (233)	7.62 (194)	4.74 (120)	6.57 (167)	10.43 (265)	20.10 (511)	23.78 (604)	17.92 (455)	13.70 (348)	150.71 (3,829)
Average snowfall inches (cm)	26.3 (67)	19.8 (50)	17.2 (44)	6.9 (18)	0.2 (0.51)	0.0 (0.0)	0.0 (0.0)	0.0 (0.0)	0.0 (0.0)	1.3 (3.3)	13.3 (34)	16.0 (41)	101.0 (257)
Average precipitation days	22.5	17.8	19.2	18.0	16.5	15.8	19.1	19.0	21.3	24.5	19.3	19.0	232.0
Average snowy days (≥ 0.1 in)	8.7	7.2	7.1	3.1	0.1	0.0	0.0	0.0	0.0	1.0	4.6	6.8	38.6
Source: NOAA (snow/snow days 1981–2010)

== Demographics ==
Historical population
Census	Pop.	Note	%±
1940	48		—
1950	180		275.0%
1960	135		−25.0%
1970	133		−1.5%
1980	180		35.3%
1990	222		23.3%
2000	163		−26.6%
2010	88		−46.0%
2020	98		11.4%
U.S. Decennial Census

Pelican first appeared on the 1940 U.S. Census as the unincorporated village of "Pelican City." It formally incorporated in 1943. It continued to return as "Pelican City" in 1950 & 1960 on census records. In 1970, onwards, it had returned simply as "Pelican."

=== 2020 census ===
As of the 2020 census, Pelican had a population of 98. The median age was 47.5 years. 16.3% of residents were under the age of 18 and 16.3% of residents were 65 years of age or older. For every 100 females there were 108.5 males, and for every 100 females age 18 and over there were 127.8 males age 18 and over.

0.0% of residents lived in urban areas, while 100.0% lived in rural areas.

There were 45 households in Pelican, of which 20.0% had children under the age of 18 living in them. Of all households, 42.2% were married-couple households, 28.9% were households with a male householder and no spouse or partner present, and 20.0% were households with a female householder and no spouse or partner present. About 31.1% of all households were made up of individuals and 11.1% had someone living alone who was 65 years of age or older.

There were 93 housing units, of which 51.6% were vacant. The homeowner vacancy rate was 6.7% and the rental vacancy rate was 5.6%.

Racial composition as of the 2020 census
Race	Number	Percent
White	59	60.2%
Black or African American	2	2.0%
American Indian and Alaska Native	18	18.4%
Asian	3	3.1%
Native Hawaiian and Other Pacific Islander	1	1.0%
Some other race	2	2.0%
Two or more races	13	13.3%
Hispanic or Latino (of any race)	4	4.1%

=== 2000 census ===
As of the census of 2000, there were 163 people, 70 households, and 41 families residing in the city. The population density was 280.5 inhabitants per square mile (108.3/km^{2}). There were 94 housing units at an average density of 161.8 units per square mile (62.5 units/km^{2}). The racial makeup of the city was 72.39% White, 21.47% Native American, 1.23% Asian, 0.61% from other races, and 4.29% from two or more races. 0.61% of the population were Hispanic or Latino of any race.

There were 70 households, out of which 30.0% had children under the age of 18 living with them, 41.4% were married couples living together, 5.7% had a female householder with no husband present, and 41.4% were non-families. 28.6% of all households were made up of individuals, and 8.6% had someone living alone who was 65 years of age or older. The average household size was 2.30 and the average family size was 2.78.

In the city, the population was spread out, with 24.5% under the age of 18, 3.1% from 18 to 24, 28.2% from 25 to 44, 34.4% from 45 to 64, and 9.8% who were 65 years of age or older. The median age was 42 years. For every 100 females, there were 143.3 males. For every 100 females age 18 and over, there were 146.0 males.

The median income for a household in the city was $48,750, and the median income for a family was $57,083. Males had a median income of $50,500 versus $3,750 for females. The per capita income for the city was $29,347. None of the families and 4.7% of the population were living below the poverty line.

== History ==
=== Shipwreck ===
According to legend, many years ago when Russian ships roamed Alaska waters, one foundered in the uncharted waters of Cross Sound. Survivors rowed their lifeboat up an inlet that would later be known as Lisianski. In a sheltered cove, they founded a settlement. They cleared and planted gardens, trapped, and hunted game. The story goes that a shipyard was built and a ship constructed, which allowed them to return to their homeland.

When the Russian settlement died, the land again reverted to wilderness. Early hunters and trappers noticed the clearing in the woods and found iron and copper tools along with sunken graves. They named the abandoned settlement "Sunnyside".

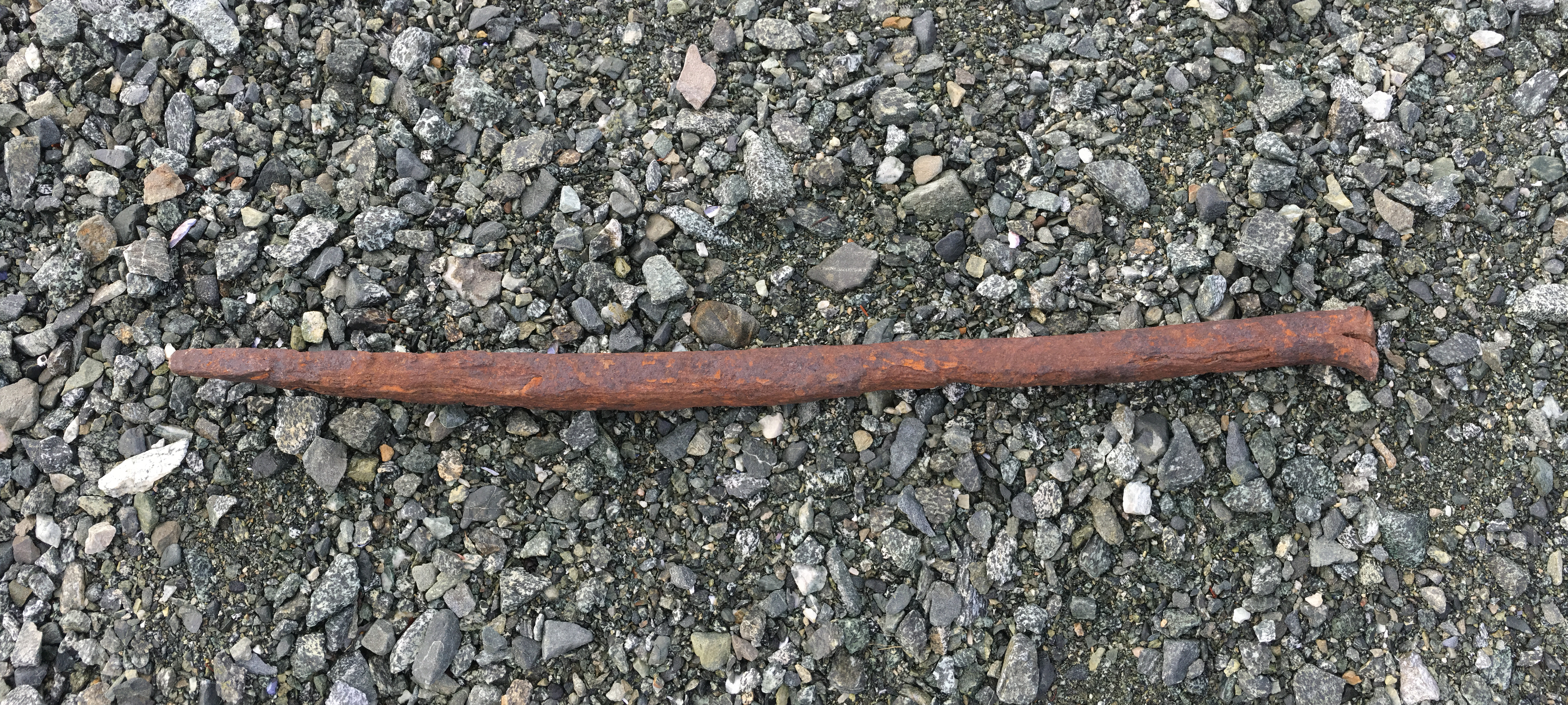
Possible Russian ship spike from the 1700s

The Lisianski Inlet Lodge is located on the site of the old Russian settlement at Sunnyside, and the owners can attest to there being "mounds" nearby in the trees that may be burial sites and finding tools in the ground.

In the late 1970s, Paul Corbin found what appears to be a spike from a Russian ship while digging a garbage pit a few hundred yards behind the Lodge. A few years later Denny Corbin found a pair of eyeglasses while digging to enforce a coffer dam in the woods behind the lodge. The eyeglasses had gold rims, blue glass, and diamond-shaped pieces of jade in each corner.

=== Mining exploration ===
By 1938 the Lisianski Inlet had become home to gold miners. Hjalmar Mork, Jack Ronning and the older of the Mork family boys operated the Mork mine, called the Goldwin Prospect.

Besides the Mork mine, there was a gold mine called the Apex, founded earlier, which can be found across the inlet from Sunnyside. The Apex-El Nido mine produced 18,000 ounces of gold. Jack Koby was developing a mine called Lucky Strike up towards the head of the inlet, and another mine was being worked at its mouth. This is the Lisianski Inlet Kalle (Charley) Raatikainen found when he started looking for a place to build a town.

=== 1938–1941 fish processing and storage development ===
Raatikainen was an Alaskan pioneer and fish buyer when fish made people wealthy. During the fishing season, he would hardly sleep, as he bought fish and ran them from the fishing grounds to Sitka. Raatikainen would leave Deer Harbor when the last troller had unloaded for the night. He would arrive in Sitka around three in the morning awaken the crew, unload, pick up groceries and arrive back on the fishing grounds by noon. Hoping to give better and faster service to the fishermen and buyers, he began looking for a place to build a cold storage plant close to the fishing grounds.

==== Location and pilings ====
Raatikainen went to his friend Hjalmar Mork and told him what he was looking for. On August 2, 1938, Hjalmar took him to a place up the inlet near his mine and suggested the location. Raatikainen found a harbor with deep water, land, and a large lake with a waterfall. Located between Juneau and Sitka, the site had everything he was looking for.

Raatikainen organized a corporation and brought in a crew to start the building. On September 26, 1938, his boat the Pelican brought in Bob DeArmond as timekeeper and storekeeper, Eli Rapich as cook's helper, and another cook known as Slim. Others may have been Don White and Gust Savela. A. P. "Coho" Walder and his wife Martha arrived with their troller and Raatikainen had one or two others with him when he brought in his fish scows. One scow was put on the beach and became the mess house with worker quarters in the upper section. The other scow was anchored out and connected to the beach by a floating walkway. It served as a warehouse as well as living quarters for workers. The town site became known as Pelican City. Why is not known, but probably not to confuse it with Raatikainen's boat the Pelican.

Joe and Jim Paddock came with their pile-driving equipment. They used their donkey engine on the pile driver to clear timber from the cold storage site. Hjalmer Mork and Jack Ronning moved their air compressor and jackhammers up from their mine to clear rock from the cold storage site.

==== Building supplies ====
The steam schooner the SS Tongass arrived and dropped overboard tons of lumber and pilings in front of the town, despite Raatikainen's lack of funds. DeArmond was the one who had to request that the captain of the Tongass defer the payment. A sawmill and other supplies were loaded on rafts and dragged ashore. The SS Tongass would be the only steamer into Pelican for the next few years with supplies but not regularly.

The first building erected ashore had a dual purpose. It housed a Finnish steam bath on one side and on the other a store and offices for the new corporation. During this time, Pelican was often referred to as "Finn Town". The town started looking like a town when the Paddocks and Raatikainen built homes. Arthur Silverman arrived from Sitka with lumber, beer, and a license to operate a beer parlor and soon was open for business.

The expense of building a cold storage, acquiring diesel engines, and building a water and electric system left the company short of money. Raatikainen went to Seattle and raised money, but it was never enough. The town continued to grow because the depression left little winter work elsewhere. Fishermen and others were willing to take food, tobacco, and stock in the company for their work.

==== Fire and general expansion ====
There was a major setback when the bathhouse caught fire and the only available fire equipment was a few buckets of salt water brought up from the beach. The bath/store building was quickly replaced and would later become home to Pelican's first school. One of the first major construction sites was a two-story multipurpose building. On the first floor a kitchen and mess hall occupied one end with the office, store and later the post office on the other side. The upper floor was used for a bunkhouse. This building's second floor is still used as a bunkhouse.

Gus Savela, a Finn and Alaskan fish buyer with engineering experience, oversaw the building of the dam. With the sawmill that had arrived on the Tongass, the Paddock brothers built the wharf, fish house and started the boardwalk. When the summer fishing season began, the men left to work other jobs or fish their boats and even Raatikainen had to take his scows to their summer stations.

Work slowed in 1939, when the Navy began building a base on Japonski Island and outside jobs became available. Even so, a post office under the name "Pelican" was established on November 27, 1939, with Bob DeArmond as first postmaster. Pelican's school opened with Arvo Wahto, of Douglas, becoming its first teacher. He would teach two generations of children before retiring in the 60's. A sawmill was built and put into operation producing the lumber to build homes adding to the permanence of the town.

In the summer of 1940 things got livelier when A. R. Breuger of Wrangell brought his floating cannery to Pelican and moored it to the dock. It brought new people and small seine boats to town, and employment to a few of the residents. By the summer of 1941 Pelican had another salmon cannery. The Cape Cross Salmon Company organized by Larry Freeburn and Pros Ganty put canning machinery and a retort in the fish house, they made a pack of more than 17,000 cases. Later, Cape Cross would build a separate cannery next to the cold storage.

==== Completion ====
Henry Roden, the former attorney general of Alaska who was helping Raatikainen raise money, finally had success when Norton Clapp agreed to participate in the project. The work of getting the cold storage plant operating immediately gathered speed. J. P. McNeil, who had been in charge of the Booth Fisheries cold storage at Sitka for many years, was hired as manager to oversee the installation of the refrigeration machinery. The hydroelectric power plant was completed and a new office and store building were attached to the cold storage.

In August 1942 the first fish was loaded into the sharp freezer. The census in 1939 gave Pelican a count of 48. In 1951 it was up to 180, it would later reach its peak at 250.

=== Recent history ===
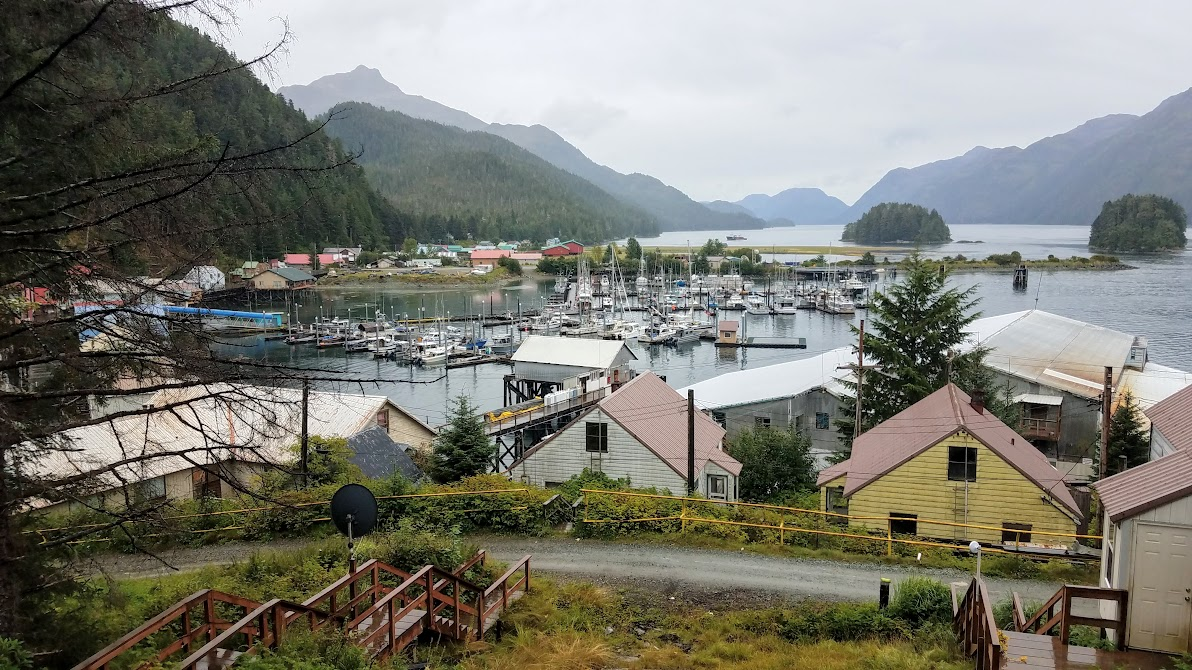
A view of Pelican from above Salmon Way, featuring the marina and First and Second Islands.

Pelican Seafoods closed for business in July 2008. The city foreclosed on the seafood plant in 2010. However, by 2016, a new fish processing business, Yakobi Fisheries, had begun to operate in Pelican.

== Education ==
Pelican School District is the school district of the city.
