= R. N. DeArmond =

American historian (1911–2010)

Robert Neil DeArmond (September 29, 1911 – November 26, 2010) was an American historian who specialized in the history of Alaska, especially the Alaska Panhandle. Throughout the 1970s and 1980s, DeArmond wrote several historical columns for southeast Alaska publications; these included Days of Yore, Gastineau Bygones, and News of the Gold Camp. He lived in Sitka, Alaska, and continued to write until his death.

== Early life and education ==
DeArmond was born in Sitka, Alaska, and raised there and in Tacoma, Washington. He graduated from Stadium High School in 1930. He worked in a salmon cannery in the summer of 1930, and later received a reporting job for the Stroller's Weekly in Juneau. In 1931, he traveled by rowboat from Sitka to Tacoma; DeArmond wrote a book about his travel, A Voyage in a Dory, in 1999. He spent a year at the University of Oregon. At age 15, he contributed a design for the flag of Alaska contest in 1927; it is housed in the Alaska State Museum.

== Career ==
DeArmond returned to Sitka after college. There, he worked in the fishing industry for 12 years. In 1938 he helped found the city of Pelican, Alaska, where he served as a storekeeper and the postmaster. The DeArmond family moved to Ketchikan, Alaska, in 1944, and Robert returned to journalism. He worked for the Ketchikan Daily News, the Juneau Empire and other publications in covering the Alaska Territorial Legislature. DeArmond was a prolific history writer for regional publications. Over 700 of his columns were put in the online Digital Bob project, sponsored by the Juneau-Douglas City Museum, beginning in 2004.

DeArmond worked for territorial governor B. Frank Heintzleman in the 1950s and lived in Juneau during this time.

== Family ==
He was married to artist Dale DeArmond née Burlison, who died on November 21, 2006. They married in 1935 and had two children, William and Jane. DeArmond died on November 26, 2010, in Sitka, Alaska.

== Bibliography ==
- The Founding of Juneau (1967)
- (with Evangeline Atwood) Who's Who in Alaskan Politics (1977)
