= Bosnia and Herzegovina at the 2025 World Aquatics Championships =

- Flag of Bosnia and Herzegovina
- World Aquatics code: BIH
- National federation: Swimming Association of Bosnia and Herzegovina

in Singapore
- Competitors: 1 in 1 sport
- Medals: Gold 0 Silver 0 Bronze 0 Total 0

World Aquatics Championships appearances
- 1994; 1998; 2001; 2003; 2005; 2007; 2009; 2011; 2013; 2015; 2017; 2019; 2022; 2023; 2024; 2025

Other related appearances
- Yugoslavia (1973–1991)

Bosnia and Herzegovina is competing at the 2025 World Aquatics Championships in Singapore from 11 July to 3 August 2025.

== Competitors ==
The following is the list of competitors in the Championships.

Sport	Men	Women	Total
Swimming	1	0	1
Total	1	0	1

== Swimming ==
Men

Athlete	Event	Heat		Semifinal		Final	
Athlete	Event	Time	Rank	Time	Rank	Time	Rank
Kenan Dračić	100 m freestyle	50.06	44	Did not advance			
Kenan Dračić	200 m freestyle	1:48.59	34	Did not advance			
