= List of people from Anchorage =

- Marisa Abegg (born 1987), retired soccer defender
- Tui Alailefaleula (born 1982), former NFL defensive tackle
- Ely Allen (born 1986), soccer player
- Casey Bailey (born 1991), AHL player for the Hershey Bears
- Ramona Barnes (1938–2003), politician
- Tony Barnette (born 1983), MLB pitcher for the Chicago Cubs
- Isadore "Ike" Bayles (1876–1956), prominent early businessman, active in the first Jewish congregation in the area; brought the first Torah to Alaska in 1900
- Marty Beckerman, writer
- Irene Bedard (born 1967), actress
- Mark Begich (born 1962), former U.S. Senator
- Nick Begich III (born 1977), U.S. representative
- Olga Bell (born 1983), musician
- Amado Benito Jr. (born 1992), martial artist
- Ethan Berkowitz (born 1962), mayor
- Barbara Britch (born 1951), two-time Olympic cross-country skier
- Fred Brown (1943–2014), attorney, electrical engineer, politician
- LaMark Brown (born 1989), AFL wide receiver for the Atlantic City Blackjacks
- Emma Broyles (born 2001), first Miss Alaska to be crowned Miss America
- Alex Bryner (born 1943), Chinese-born Russian American retired lawyer and jurist
- Seaborn Buckalew Jr. (1920–2017), judge
- Kira Buckland (born 1987), actress
- Edith Bullock (1903–1994), businesswoman and politician active in Alaska during its territorial and early statehood eras
- Robert Bundtzen (born 1949), dog musher, physician
- Sue Burns (1950–2009), former principal owner of the San Francisco Giants
- David Carle (born 1989), ice hockey coach
- Matt Carle (born 1984), former NHL defenseman
- Shawn Chacón (born 1977), former MLB pitcher
- Mario Chalmers (born 1986), basketball player
- Valentina Chepiga (born 1962), bodybuilder
- Quinn Christopherson, singer-songwriter
- Callan Chythlook-Sifsof (born 1989), snowboarder
- Sharon Cissna (born 1942), politician
- Jordan Clarke (born 1990), track and field shot putter
- Don Clary (born 1957), long-distance runner
- Tyler Collins, actor
- Michelle Coombs, geologist living in Anchorage and working at Alaska Volcano Observatory
- Stan Cornelius (1941–2005), country musician, lawyer
- John Cowdery (1930–2013), Republican member of the Alaska Senate, representing the O District from 2001 through 2008
- Joey Crabb (born 1983), former NHL winger
- Tristan Crawford (born 1982), baseball pitcher
- Chancy Croft (born 1937), attorney
- David Cuddy (born 1952), businessman, Republican politician
- Aaron Cunningham (born 1986), former MLB outfielder
- Erin Dagon-Mitchell (born 1965), actress, screenwriter
- Anna Dalton, long-distance runner
- Grayson Davey (born 2001), sport shooter, participated at the 2018 ISSF World Shooting Championships
- Clair DeGeorge - ice hockey player for the New York Sirens
- Mahala Ashley Dickerson (1912–2007), lawyer, activist
- Traci Dinwiddie (born 1973), actress
- Pam Dreyer (born 1981), ice hockey goaltender
- Brandon Dubinsky (born 1986), NHL player for the Columbus Blue Jackets
- Kate Earl, singer-songwriter
- William A. Egan (1914–1984), first Governor of Alaska (1959-1966)
- Erik Ellington (born 1977), skateboarder, entrepreneur, designer
- Johnny Ellis (born 1960), politician
- Doug Evans (born 1980), martial artist
- Dana Fabe (born 1951), first female associate justice of the Alaska Supreme Court
- Jan Faiks (1945–2017), politician
- Rosey Fletcher (born 1975), Olympic snowboarder
- Sue Forbes (born 1961), cross-country skier
- Walt Furnace (born 1943), politician
- Bryan Gates, assistant coach for the Minnesota Timberwolves
- Robert Gillam (1946–2018), founder of McKinley Capital Management
- Scott Gomez (born 1979), NHL coach; former NHL player
- James Gottstein, lawyer
- Mike Gravel (1930–2021), politician
- Perry Green (born 1936), poker player
- Charlo Greene (born 1988), businesswoman
- Kelsey Griffin (born 1987), basketball player
- Clark Gruening (born 1943), attorney
- Gene Guess (1932–1975), lawyer, politician
- Gretchen Guess (born 1969), politician
- Andrew Halcro (born 1964), independent politician
- Rosie Hamlin (1945–2017), singer-songwriter
- Robert Hansen (1939–2014), serial killer
- Daniel Hardy (born 1987), former NFL Tight End
- Ramon Harris (born 1988), basketball player
- D'Angelo Harrison (born 1993), basketball player
- Lorene Harrison (1905–2005), educator, singer, choir director, milliner
- Joe L. Hayes (1930–2018), civil engineer, lobbyist, politician, surveyor
- Barrett Heisten (born 1980), former NHL forward
- Ermalee Hickel (1925–2017), philanthropist and First Lady of Alaska
- Israel Keyes (1978-2012), serial killer
- Wally Hickel (1919–2010), industrialist, twice governor, U.S. Secretary of the Interior
- Augie Hiebert (1916–2007), television executive
- Caleb Holley (born 1990), CFL wide receiver
- Lindsey Holmes (born 1973), Republican member of the Alaska House of Representatives, representing the 26th District since 2006
- Lydia Jacoby (born 2004), Olympic swimmer
- Jessica Jaymes (1979–2019), pornographic actress
- Ruth Jefford (1914–2007), air taxi pilot, violinist
- Acacia Johnson (born 1990), polar photographer
- Justin Johnson (born 1981), ice hockey forward
- Keith Johnson (born 1980), Paralympic soccer player
- Michelle Johnson (born 1965), actress
- Andy Jones (born 1985), high diver
- Andy Josephson (born 1964), politician
- Kenny Kaos (born 1970), former wrestler
- Wendell P. Kay (1913–1986), lawyer
- Tim Kelly (1944–2009), banker, Republican politician
- Bruce B. Kendall (1919–2012), politician
- Joan Arend Kickbush (1926–2006), artist
- Tyler Kornfield (born 1991), cross-country skier
- Chris Kuper (born 1982), former NFL offensive guard
- Randy Kutcher (born 1960), former MLB outfielder
- Trajan Langdon (born 1976), basketball player
- Michael Lardie (born 1958), musician, member of the band Great White
- Linda Larkin (born 1970), actress
- Peter Lash (born 1959), handball player
- Osia Lewis (1962–2020), former AFL linebacker
- Sammy Lilly (born 1965), former NFL defensive back
- Brock Lindow (born 1975), lead vocalist of metalcore band 36 Crazyfists
- Karen L. Loeffler (born 1957), politician
- Scott Loucks (born 1956), former MLB outfielder
- Margie Mahoney (born 1952), cross-country skier
- Rosie Mancari (born 1994), snowboarder
- Andre Marrou (born 1938), third Libertarian to be elected to a U.S. state legislature; graduate of MIT
- Gina Mazany (born 1988), female MMA fighter under UFC promotion
- Steve McAlpine (born 1949), lawyer
- Lane McCray (born 1962), singer, songwriter, rapper, entertainer; best known for fronting '90s group La Bouche
- Carl McCunn (1946–1981), photographer; became stranded in the Alaskan wilderness and eventually committed suicide when he ran out of supplies
- Linious "Mac" McGee (1897–1988), aviation pioneer and founder of McGee Airways, which, through a long series of mergers and acquisitions became Alaska Airlines
- Lesil McGuire (born 1971), Republican member of the Alaska Senate, 2007–2017
- Keegan Messing (born 1992), figure skater
- Dan Mintz (born 1981), voice actor, comedian; best known for his voice acting role as Bob's oldest daughter Tina Belcher on the animated show Bob's Burgers
- Tommy Moe (born 1970), alpine ski racer
- James Morrison (born 1954), actor
- Lauren Murphy (born 1983), mixed martial artist
- Delvin Myles (born 1972), former CFL player
- Buell A. Nesbett (1910–1993), soldier, lawyer, businessman, and the first chief justice of the Alaska Supreme Court
- Luke Nichols (born 1978), YouTuber
- Daishen Nix (born 2002), basketball player
- Rashard Odomes (born 1996), basketball player in the Israeli Basketball Premier League
- Diana Olson (born 1969), rower
- Jeff Overbaugh (born 1993), football long snapper
- Jeff Pain (born 1970), skeleton racer
- John Paragon (1954–2021), actor, writer, director; best known for his work on the television series Pee-wee's Playhouse, where he portrayed Jambi the Genie
- Annie Parisse (born 1975), actress
- Sean Parnell (born 1962), tenth governor of Alaska and served until 2014; member of the Republican Party
- Alan Paul (born 1966), journalist, author, musician, blogger
- Drue Pearce (born 1951), Deputy Administrator of the Pipeline and Hazardous Materials Safety Administration
- Jordan Pearce (born 1986), former ice hockey goaltender
- Mary Peltola (born 1973), U.S. representative for Alaska; first woman and first person born in Alaska to represent the state
- Josh Phelps (born 1978), former MLB first baseman
- Alissa Pili (born 2001), WNBA player for the Los Angeles Sparks
- Kathryn Poland (1919–2010), businesswoman
- Harold Pruett (1969–2002), actor
- Lance Pruitt (born 1981), Republican member of the Alaska House of Representatives from the 27th district
- Kikkan Randall (born 1982), Olympic gold medalist (cross-country skiing)
- Sean Rash (born 1982), professional bowler and 2011–12 PBA Player of the Year
- Fran Reed (1943–2008), artist
- Robert Campbell Reeve (1902–1980), founder of Reeve Aleutian Airways
- Shirley Reilly (born 1985), wheelchair racer
- Libby Roderick (born 1958), singer-songwriter
- Norm Rokeberg (born 1943), served in the Alaska House of Representatives and was a Republican
- Mark Rosen, volleyball head coach at the University of Michigan
- Robert Rozier (born 1955), former NFL defensive end, convicted for writing fraudulent checks; born in Alaska but raised in California
- James Ryan (born 1974), co-founder of Litmus Logic
- Jason Ryznar (born 1983), former NHL winger
- Ralph Samuels (born 1961), businessman and a member of the Republican Party and candidate for Governor of Alaska
- Larry Sanger (born 1968), co-founded the online encyclopedia Wikipedia along with Jimmy Wales, for which Sanger coined the name and wrote much of its original governing policy; when he was seven years old, his family moved to Anchorage, where he grew up
- Curt Schilling (born 1966), former MLB pitcher
- Daniel Schlereth (born 1986), baseball pitcher
- Mark Schlereth (born 1966), sportscaster; former NFL guard
- James Schoppert (1947–1992), artist
- Jessica Schultz (born 1985), curler
- Martin Sensmeier (born 1985), actor
- Susan Joy Share, artist
- Marcus Shelby (born 1966), bass player
- Don Simpson (1943–1996), actor and screenwriter
- Jamie Sinclair (born 1992), curler
- Steve Smith (born 1985), former NFL wide receiver
- Todd Snyder (born 1965), former racing driver
- Joe Spenard (1879–1934), early settler of Anchorage, Alaska; Lake Spenard, Spenard Road, and the city of Spenard, Alaska (now incorporated into the Municipality of Anchorage) bear his name
- Bill Spencer (born 1956), cross-country skier
- Lynn Spencer-Galanes (born 1954), cross-country skier
- Steve Staggs (born 1951), former MLB second baseman
- Ryan Stassel (born 1992), snowboarder
- Rachel Steer (born 1978), biathlete
- Margaret Stock (born 1961), former lieutenant colonel in the United States Army Reserve; Independent candidate in the 2016 Senate election in Alaska
- Dan Sullivan (born 1964), U.S. Senator
- Hunter Sulte (born 2002), soccer player
- Jeremy Swayman (born 1998), NHL goaltender currently playing for the Boston Bruins, Gold Medalist at the Milano Cortina Olympics
- Khleo Thomas (born 1989), actor, rapper, entertainer
- Lowell Thomas Jr. (1923–2016), 3rd Lieutenant Governor of Alaska
- Nate Thompson (born 1984), NHL center currently playing for the Winnipeg Jets
- Kristen Thorsness (born 1960), rower
- Obed Vargas (born 2005), professional soccer player
- Damian Vaughn (born 1975), former NFL tight end
- Liz Vazquez, Republican member of the Alaska House of Representatives, 2015–2017
- David Veikune (born 1985), NFL defensive end
- Sydne Vogel (born 1979), figure skater
- Brian Voss (born 1958), professional bowler and PBA/USBC Hall of Famer
- Bill Walker (born 1951), 11th Governor of Alaska
- Tim Wallace (1984), former NHL center
- Eric Walsky (born 1984), NLA right winger currently playing for HC Lugano
- Jerry Ward (born 1948), Republican politician
- Bob Wells (born 1955), vandweller
- Nathan West (born 1978), actor, musician, singer
- Mr. Whitekeys, musician
- Bill Wielechowski (born 1967), politician
- Lael Wilcox, ultra-endurance bicycle racer
- David Williams (born 1979), former MLB pitcher
- Roger L. Worsley (born 1937), educator; vice-chancellor University of Alaska Anchorage, 1978–1985
- B.J. Young (1977–2005), former NHL right winger

== See also ==
- List of people from Alaska
