= Bosnia and Herzegovina at the 2015 World Aquatics Championships =

- Flag of Bosnia and Herzegovina
- World Aquatics code: BIH
- National federation: Swimming Association of Bosnia and Herzegovina

in Kazan, Russia
- Competitors: 4 in 1 sport
- Medals: Gold 0 Silver 0 Bronze 0 Total 0

World Aquatics Championships appearances
- 1994; 1998; 2001; 2003; 2005; 2007; 2009; 2011; 2013; 2015; 2017; 2019; 2022; 2023; 2024; 2025

Other related appearances
- Yugoslavia (1973–1991)

Bosnia and Herzegovina competed at the 2015 World Aquatics Championships in Kazan, Russia from 24 July to 9 August 2015.

== Swimming ==
Bosnia and Herzegovinian swimmers have achieved qualifying standards in the following events (up to a maximum of 2 swimmers in each event at the A-standard entry time, and 1 at the B-standard):

Men

| Athlete | Event | Heat | | Semifinal | | Final | |
| Athlete | Event | Time | Rank | Time | Rank | Time | Rank |
|---|---|---|---|---|---|---|---|
| Mihajlo Čeprkalo | 1500 m freestyle | 15:26.22 | 26 | —N/a | | did not advance | |
| Mihajlo Čeprkalo | 200 m butterfly | 2:05.64 | 36 | did not advance | | | |
| Ensar Hajder | 200 m freestyle | 1:51.96 | 55 | did not advance | | | |
| Ensar Hajder | 400 m freestyle | 4:02.41 | 59 | —N/a | | did not advance | |
| Ensar Hajder | 200 m individual medley | 2:04.99 | 36 | did not advance | | | |

Women

| Athlete | Event | Heat | | Semifinal | | Final | |
| Athlete | Event | Time | Rank | Time | Rank | Time | Rank |
|---|---|---|---|---|---|---|---|
| Amina Kajtaz | 50 m butterfly | 28.32 | 42 | did not advance | | | |
| Amina Kajtaz | 100 m butterfly | 1:03.39 | 48 | did not advance | | | |
| Ivana Ninković | 50 m breaststroke | 33.77 | 47 | did not advance | | | |
