= Bosnia and Herzegovina at the 2023 World Aquatics Championships =

- Flag of Bosnia and Herzegovina
- World Aquatics code: BIH
- National federation: Swimming Association of Bosnia and Herzegovina

in Fukuoka, Japan
- Competitors: 4 in 1 sport
- Medals: Gold 0 Silver 0 Bronze 0 Total 0

World Aquatics Championships appearances
- 1994; 1998; 2001; 2003; 2005; 2007; 2009; 2011; 2013; 2015; 2017; 2019; 2022; 2023; 2024; 2025

Other related appearances
- Yugoslavia (1973–1991)

Bosnia and Herzegovina competed at the 2023 World Aquatics Championships in Fukuoka, Japan from 14 to 30 July 2023.

== Swimming ==
Bosnia and Herzegovina entered 4 swimmers.

Men

Athlete	Event	Heat		Semifinal		Final	
Athlete	Event	Time	Rank	Time	Rank	Time	Rank
Jovan Lekić	200 metre freestyle	1:49.54	35	Did not advance			
Jovan Lekić	400 metre freestyle	3:53.17	27	—		Did not advance	
Adi Mešetović	50 metre freestyle	22.92	52	Did not advance			
Adi Mešetović	100 metre freestyle	51.00	54	Did not advance			

Women

Athlete	Event	Heat		Semifinal		Final	
Athlete	Event	Time	Rank	Time	Rank	Time	Rank
Iman Avdić	200 metre freestyle	2:04.38	45	Did not advance			
Iman Avdić	400 metre freestyle	4:20.04	32	—		Did not advance	
Lana Pudar	100 metre butterfly	57.95	10 Q	57.34	10	Did not advance	
Lana Pudar	200 metre butterfly	2:08.16	5 Q	2:06.60	1 Q	2:07.05	4
