= List of Bosnian and Herzegovinian records in swimming =

The Bosnian and Herzegovinian records in swimming are the fastest ever performances of swimmers from Bosnia and Herzegovina, which are recognised and ratified by the Swimming Association of Bosnia and Herzegovina.

All records were set in finals unless noted otherwise.

== Long Course (50 m) ==
=== Men ===
| Event | Time | | Name | Club | Date | Meet | Location | Ref |
|---|---|---|---|---|---|---|---|---|
| 50 m freestyle | 22.56 | h | Emir Muratović | Bosnia and Herzegovina | 26 July 2019 | World Championships | Gwangju, South Korea | |
| 100 m freestyle | 49.37 | h | Emir Muratović | Olymp Banja Luka | 26 May 2019 | Banja Luka Open | Banja Luka, Bosnia and Herzegovina | |
| 200 m freestyle | 1:48.46 | | Jovan Lekić | Bosnia and Herzegovina | 10 July 2021 | European Junior Championships | Rome, Italy | |
| 400 m freestyle | 3:50.79 | | Jovan Lekić | Bosnia and Herzegovina | 6 July 2021 | European Junior Championships | Rome, Italy | |
| 800 m freestyle | 8:01.24 | | Jovan Lekić | Bosnia and Herzegovina | 11 July 2021 | European Junior Championships | Rome, Italy | |
| 1500 m freestyle | 15:17.83 | | Jovan Lekić | Bosnia and Herzegovina | 8 July 2021 | European Junior Championships | Rome, Italy | |
| 50 m backstroke | 25.53 | | Emir Muratović | Olymp Banja Luka | 25 May 2019 | Banja Luka Open | Banja Luka, Bosnia and Herzegovina | |
| 100 m backstroke | 56.17 | h | Kenan Dračić | Bosnia and Herzegovina | 15 August 2026 | European Championships | Paris, France | |
| 200 m backstroke | 2:06.32 | | Aleksa Krminac | Bosnia and Herzegovina | 23 March 2019 | Susret Reprezentacija Bih-Hr-Slo-Srb | Rijeka, Croatia | |
| 50m breaststroke | 29.25 | | Adi Mešetović | Olymp Banja Luka | 8 July 2017 | Summer Championships of Bosnia and Herzegovina | Banja Luka, Bosnia and Herzegovina | |
| 100m breaststroke | 1:04.93 | | Arian Kadić | Sport Time | 12 July 2025 | Srdjan i Maksim Meet | Trebinje, Bosnia and Herzegovina | |
| 200m breaststroke | 2:18.66 | h | Arian Kadić | Bosnia and Herzegovina | 3 July 2025 | European Junior Championships | Šamorín, Slovakia | |
| 50m butterfly | 24.00 | | Emir Muratović | Olymp Banja Luka | 7 June 2019 | Summer Championships of Bosnia and Herzegovina | Sarajevo, Bosnia and Herzegovina | |
| 100m butterfly | 52.93 | | Mihajlo Čeprkalo | Vojvodina | 19 December 2019 | Győr Open | Győr, Hungary | |
| 200m butterfly | 2:00.37 | | Jovan Lekić | 22. April - Banja Luka | 29 April 2023 | International Swimming Meet “22 April” | Banja Luka, Bosnia and Herzegovina | |
| 200m individual medley | 2:02.99 | | Ensar Hajder | Zmaj-Alpamm Tuzla | 12 June 2016 | Banja Luka Open | Banja Luka, Bosnia and Herzegovina | |
| 400m individual medley | 4:27.60 | | Jovan Lekić | 22. April - Banja Luka | 2 July 2023 | MPM Borac Telegroup Grand Challenge | Banja Luka, Bosnia and Herzegovina | |
| 4×50m freestyle relay | 1:32.54 | | Marko Babić (24.38); Adi Mešetović (22.86); Emir Muratović (22.43); Nikola Bjelajac (22.87) | Olymp Banja Luka | 26 May 2018 | BI Open | Banja Luka, Bosnia and Herzegovina | |
| 4×100m freestyle relay | 3:27.58 | | Arian Kadić (50.55); Hamza Pita (53.48); Džan Greljo (52.97); Kenan Dračić (50.58) | Sport Time | 13 June 2026 | Summer Championships of Bosnia and Herzegovina | Sarajevo, Bosnia and Herzegovina | |
| 4×200m freestyle relay | 7:47.49 | | Anđelo Šimić (1:53.54); Kosta Vrkeš (1:57.43); Amar Šapčanin (2:03.95); Mihajlo Čeprkalo (1:52.57) | Bosnia and Herzegovina | 6 May 2017 | Junior Balkan Games | Sofia, Bulgaria | |
| 4×50m medley relay | 1:49.17 | | Filip Kuruzović (29.03); Adi Mešetović (29.18); Aleksa Đukanović (27.39); Marko Babić (23.57) | Borac | 19 June 2022 | Championships of Bosnia and Herzegovina | Sarajevo, Bosnia and Herzegovina | |
| 4×100m medley relay | 3:53.42 | | Aleksa Krminac (1:00.49); Amar Šapčanin (1:07.02); Mihajlo Čeprkalo (55.22); Anđelo Šimić (50.69) | Bosnia and Herzegovina | 7 May 2017 | Junior Balkan Games | Sofia, Bulgaria | |

Legend: # – Record awaiting ratification by Swimming Association of Bosnia and Herzegovina; WR – World record; ER – European record; e – equalled existing record;
Records not set in finals: h – heat; sf – semifinal; r – relay 1st leg; rh – relay heat 1st leg; b – B final; † – en route to final mark; so – swim-off; tt – time trial

=== Women ===
| Event | Time | | Name | Club | Date | Meet | Location | Ref |
|---|---|---|---|---|---|---|---|---|
| 50m freestyle | 26.25 | tt | Lamija Medošević | GKVS Sarajevo | 8 June 2019 | Summer Championships of Bosnia and Herzegovina | Sarajevo, Bosnia and Herzegovina | |
| 100m freestyle | 55.91 | | Lana Pudar | Orka Mostar | 3 June 2023 | Summer Championships of Bosnia and Herzegovina | Banja Luka, Bosnia and Herzegovina | |
| 200m freestyle | 2:01.42 | = | Iman Avdić | Sport Time | 7 March 2026 | HPS Grand Prix | Rijeka, Croatia | |
| 200m freestyle | 2:01.42 | = | Iman Avdić | Bosnia and Herzegovina | 23 August 2026 | Mediterranean Games | Taranto, Italy | |
| 400m freestyle | 4:17.01 | | Lana Pudar | Orka Mostar | 3 June 2023 | Summer Championships of Bosnia and Herzegovina | Banja Luka, Bosnia and Herzegovina | |
| 800m freestyle | 8:54.24 | | Zerina Vrabac | Mt Kelly | 25 May 2026 | AP Race London International | London, United Kingdom | |
| 1500m freestyle | 17:23.67 | | Iman Avdić | Sport Time | 5 March 2023 | Championships of Bosnia and Herzegovina | Sarajevo, Bosnia and Herzegovina | |
| 50m backstroke | 29.76 | | Amina Kajtaz | Velež Mostar | 9 July 2017 | Summer Championships of Bosnia and Herzegovina | Banja Luka, Bosnia and Herzegovina | |
| 100m backstroke | 1:03.97 | | Hena Mešić | Sport Time Sarajevo | 7 June 2019 | Summer Championships of Bosnia and Herzegovina | Sarajevo, Bosnia and Herzegovina | |
| 200m backstroke | 2:20.75 | | Iman Avdić | Sport Time | 26 April 2026 | Swim Wars | Banja Luka, Bosnia and Herzegovina | |
| 50m breaststroke | 31.70 | | Ivana Ninković | Olymp Banja Luka | 19 July 2014 | - | Banja Luka, Bosnia and Herzegovina | |
| 100m breaststroke | 1:11.19 | h | Ivana Ninković | Bosnia and Herzegovina | 22 May 2012 | European Championships | Debrecen, Hungary | |
| 200m breaststroke | 2:33.63 | | Emina Pašukan | Bosna Sarajevo | 9 December 2017 | Mm Maribor | Maribor, Slovenia | |
| 50m butterfly | 26.10 | | Lana Pudar | Bosnia and Herzegovina | 9 July 2023 | European Junior Championships | Belgrade, Serbia | |
| 100m butterfly | 56.95 | | Lana Pudar | Bosnia and Herzegovina | 6 July 2023 | European Junior Championships | Belgrade, Serbia | |
| 200m butterfly | 2:06.26 | | Lana Pudar | Bosnia and Herzegovina | 8 July 2023 | European Junior Championships | Belgrade, Serbia | |
| 200m individual medley | 2:17.29 | | Amina Kajtaz | Mladost | 30 May 2021 | Croatian Championships | Zagreb, Croatia | |
| 400m individual medley | 4:49.89 | (Note: listed by plivanje.info but Amina Kajtaz represented BIH until 2022, then swims for Croatia) | Amina Kajtaz | PK Kantrida | 6 May 2023 | Golden Orlando | Dubrovnik, Croatia | |
| 4×50m freestyle relay | 1:55.38 | | Hena Mesić (29.34); Hena Kapidžić (28.88); Sara Samardžić (29.08); Aiša Huremović (28.08) | GKVS Sarajevo | 19 June 2022 | Championships of Bosnia and Herzegovina | Sarajevo, Bosnia and Herzegovina | |
| 4×100m freestyle relay | 3:56.12 | | Lamija Medošević (57.17); Emina Pašukan (1:00.50); Anida Mahinić (59.71); Nejla Karić (58.74) | Bosnia and Herzegovina | 25 March 2017 | Susret Reprezentacija | Banja Luka, Bosnia and Herzegovina | |
| 4×200m freestyle relay | 8:39.88 | | Nejla Karić (2:07.72); Emina Pašukan (2:10.55); Anida Mahnić (2:11.13); Natalija Stanojević (2:10.48) | Bosnia and Herzegovina | 7 May 2017 | Junior Balkan Games | Sofia, Bulgaria | |
| 4×50m medley relay | 2:06.54 | | Hena Mesić (32.77); Sara Samardžić (34.78); Hena Kapidžić (30.45); Aiša Huremović (28.54) | GKVS Sarajevo | 18 June 2022 | Championships of Bosnia and Herzegovina | Sarajevo, Bosnia and Herzegovina | |
| 4×100m medley relay | 4:20.23 | | Lamija Medošević (1:05.82); Emina Pašukan (1:16.69); Amina Kajtaz (59.12); Nejla Karić (58.60) | Bosnia and Herzegovina | 24 March 2019 | Susret Reprezentacija Bih-Hr-Slo-Srb | Rijeka, Croatia | |

Legend: # – Record awaiting ratification by Swimming Association of Bosnia and Herzegovina; WR – World record; ER – European record; e – equalled existing record;
Records not set in finals: h – heat; sf – semifinal; r – relay 1st leg; rh – relay heat 1st leg; b – B final; † – en route to final mark; so – swim-off; tt – time trial

=== Mixed relay ===
| Event | Time | Name | Club | Date | Meet | Location | Ref |
|---|---|---|---|---|---|---|---|
| 4×100m freestyle relay | 3:40.08 | Mihajlo Čeprkalo (51.52); Lamija Medošević (57.92); Nejla Karić (59.17); Andjelo Simić (51.47) | Bosnia and Herzegovina | 26 March 2017 | Susret Reprezentacija Bih-Hr-Slo-Srb | Banja Luka, Bosnia and Herzegovina | |
| 4×100m medley relay | 4:02.77 | Aleksa Krminac (1:00.30); Amar Šapčanin (1:06.76); Amina Kajtaz (59.11); Lamija Medošević (56.60) | Bosnia and Herzegovina | 23 March 2019 | Susret mladih reprezentacija SLO-SRB-BiH-CRO | Zagreb, Croatia | |

Legend: # – Record awaiting ratification by Swimming Association of Bosnia and Herzegovina; WR – World record; ER – European record; e – equalled existing record;
Records not set in finals: h – heat; sf – semifinal; r – relay 1st leg; rh – relay heat 1st leg; b – B final; † – en route to final mark; so – swim-off; tt – time trial

== Short Course (25 m) ==
=== Men ===
| Event | Time | | Name | Club | Date | Meet | Location | Ref |
|---|---|---|---|---|---|---|---|---|
| 50m freestyle | 21.83 | sf | Emir Muratović | Bosnia and Herzegovina | 3 November 2021 | European Championships | Kazan, Russia | |
| 100m freestyle | 48.20 | | Mihajlo Čeprkalo | Vojvodina | 14 December 2019 | Serbian Championships | Kikinda, Serbia | |
| 200m freestyle | 1:43.97 | | Kenan Dračić | Sport Time | 9 November 2025 | Mladost Meet | Zagreb, Croatia | |
| 400m freestyle | 3:43.61 | | Jovan Lekić | 22. April - Banja Luka | 17 December 2022 | Championships of Bosnia and Herzegovina | Sarajevo, Bosnia and Herzegovina | |
| 800m freestyle | 7:54.16 | h | Jovan Lekić | Bosnia and Herzegovina | 22 November 2022 | Solidarity Games | Kazan, Russia | |
| 1500m freestyle | 15:05.66 | | Jovan Lekić | 22. April Banja Luka | 8 November 2020 | Mladost Meet | Zagreb, Croatia | |
| 50m backstroke | 23.48 | | Dino Hasibović Sirotanović | Bosna Sarajevo | 18 November 2023 | - | Sarajevo, Bosnia and Herzegovina | |
| 100m backstroke | 52.50 | h | Dino Hasibović Sirotanović | Bosnia and Herzegovina | 10 December 2024 | World Championships | Budapest, Hungary | |
| 200m backstroke | 1:59.99 | | Kenan Dračić | Sport Time | 16 November 2025 | Championships of Bosnia and Herzegovina | Banja Luka, Bosnia and Herzegovina | |
| 50m breaststroke | 28.03 | | Adi Mešetović | Olymp Banja Luka | 3 March 2018 | Championship of Republika Srpska | Banja Luka, Bosnia and Herzegovina | |
| 100m breaststroke | 1:01.73 | | Arian Kadić | Sport Time | 29 December 2024 | Championships of Bosnia and Herzegovina | Banja Luka, Bosnia and Herzegovina | |
| 200m breaststroke | 2:13.54 | | Arian Kadić | Sport Time | 28 December 2024 | Championships of Bosnia and Herzegovina | Banja Luka, Bosnia and Herzegovina | |
| 50m butterfly | 23.30 | | Mackey Nurkic Kacapor | Plivački savez BiH | 14 November 2026 | Championships of Bosnia and Herzegovina | Banja Luka, Bosnia and Herzegovina | |
| 100m butterfly | 51.70 | | Mackey Nurkic Kacapor | Plivački savez BiH | 15 November 2026 | Championships of Bosnia and Herzegovina | Banja Luka, Bosnia and Herzegovina | |
| 200m butterfly | 1:57.58 | | Jovan Lekić | 22. April Banja Luka | 7 November 2020 | Mladost Meet | Zagreb, Croatia | |
| 100m individual medley | 53.89 | | Ensar Hajder | SG Essen | 23 November 2013 | German Championships | Wuppertal, Germany | |
| 200m individual medley | 1:57.05 | | Ensar Hajder | SG Essen | 24 November 2013 | German Championships | Wuppertal, Germany | |
| 400m individual medley | 4:16.70 | | Ensar Hajder | SG Essen | 7 February 2015 | German Club Championships | Essen, Germany | |
| 4×50m freestyle relay | 1:32.88 | | Adi Mešetović; Džan Greljo; Haris Šuta; Hasibović Sirotanović | Bosna - Sarajevo | 28 December 2024 | - | Banja Luka, Bosnia and Herzegovina | |
| 4×50m freestyle relay | 1:31.55 | h, # | Adi Mešetović (22.15); Dino Hasibović Sirotanović (23.17); Kenan Dračić (22.58); David Vučić (23.65) | Bosnia and Herzegovina | 5 December 2023 | European Championships | Otopeni, Romania | |
| 4×100m freestyle relay | 3:25.42 | | Mihajlo Čeprkalo (50.91); Marko Kovačić (51.51); Ilijan Malčić (51.78); Kosta Vrkeš (51.22) | 22. April Banja Luka | 4 March 2017 | Championships of Republika Srpska | Banja Luka, Bosnia and Herzegovina | |
| 4×200m freestyle relay | 7:37.29 | | Mihajlo Čeprkalo (1:51.82); Marko Kovačić (1:58.41); Kosta Vrkeš (1:54.05); Ilijan Malčić (1:53.01) | 22. April Banja Luka | 19 March 2016 | Championships of Bosnia and Herzegovina | Banja Luka, Bosnia and Herzegovina | |
| 4×50m medley relay | 1:46.20 | | Feđa Omerbegović (28.07); Amar Šapčanin (29.15); Fatih Tahirović (24.82); Arman Livadić (24.16) | Sport Time Sarajevo | 30 December 2018 | Championships of Bosnia and Herzegovina | Sarajevo, Bosnia and Herzegovina | |
| 4×50m medley relay | 1:40.28 | h, # | Dino Hasibović Sirotanović (24.24); Arian Kadić (30.14); Kenan Dračić (24.32); Adi Mešetović (21.58) | Bosnia and Herzegovina | 6 December 2023 | European Championships | Otopeni, Romania | |
| 4×100m medley relay | 3:46.19 | | Ahmed Hasakovic (57.96); Arian Kadić (1:02.30); Kenan Dračić (53.33); Ali Corbo (52.60) | Sport Time | 28 December 2024 | Championships of Bosnia and Herzegovina | Banja Luka, Bosnia and Herzegovina | |

Legend: # – Record awaiting ratification by Swimming Association of Bosnia and Herzegovina; WR – World record; ER – European record; e – equalled existing record;
Records not set in finals: h – heat; sf – semifinal; r – relay 1st leg; rh – relay heat 1st leg; b – B final; † – en route to final mark; so – swim-off; tt – time trial

=== Women ===
| Event | Time | | Name | Club | Date | Meet | Location | Ref |
|---|---|---|---|---|---|---|---|---|
| 50m freestyle | 25.52 | r | Lana Pudar | Orka Mostar | 30 December 2021 | Championships of Bosnia and Herzegovina | Sarajevo, Bosnia and Herzegovina | |
| 100m freestyle | 54.60 | | Lana Pudar | Orka Mostar | 30 December 2021 | Championships of Bosnia and Herzegovina | Sarajevo, Bosnia and Herzegovina | |
| 200m freestyle | 1:59.07 | | Amina Kajtaz | Mladost | 19 December 2021 | Croatian Championships | Rijeka, Croatia | |
| 400m freestyle | 4:10.83 | = | Lana Pudar | Orka Mostar | 13 November 2022 | Mladost Grand Prix | Zagreb, Croatia | |
| 400m freestyle | 4:10.83 | h, =, # | Iman Avdić | Bosnia and Herzegovina | 10 December 2024 | World Championships | Budapest, Hungary | |
| 400m freestyle | 4:10.74 | h, # | Iman Avdić | Bosnia and Herzegovina | 2 December 2025 | European Championships | Lublin, Poland | |
| 800m freestyle | 8:38.73 | | Iman Avdić | Sport Time | 12 November 2022 | Mladost Grand Prix | Zagreb, Croatia | |
| 1500m freestyle | 16:36.78 | | Zerina Vrabac | Sport Time | 29 December 2024 | - | Banja Luka, Bosnia and Herzegovina | |
| 1500m freestyle | 16:33.34 | '#' | Iman Avdić | Sport Time | 29 December 2024 | Championships of Bosnia and Herzegovina | Banja Luka, Bosnia and Herzegovina | |
| 50m backstroke | 28.76 | | Lana Pudar | Orka Mostar | 29 December 2021 | Championships of Bosnia and Herzegovina | Sarajevo, Bosnia and Herzegovina | |
| 100m backstroke | 1:01.67 | | Amina Kajtaz | Jug | 12 December 2015 | Croatian Championships | Rijeka, Croatia | |
| 200m backstroke | 2:14.06 | | Iman Avdić | Sport Time | 16 November 2024 (Note: also 16 December 2024 by plivanje.info, a typo) | Sarajevo Aquatics Meet | Sarajevo, Bosnia and Herzegovina | |
| 50m breaststroke | 31.22 | | Ivana Ninković | Olymp Banja Luka | 23 March 2013 | Championships of Bosnia and Herzegovina | Banja Luka, Bosnia and Herzegovina | |
| 100m breaststroke | 1:08.93 | | Ivana Ninković | Olymp Banja Luka | 23 March 2013 | Championships of Bosnia and Herzegovina | Banja Luka, Bosnia and Herzegovina | |
| 200m breaststroke | 2:30.80 | | Emina Pašukan | Bosna | 29 December 2017 | Championships of Bosnia and Herzegovina | Sarajevo, Bosnia and Herzegovina | |
| 50m butterfly | 26.09 | | Lana Pudar | Bosnia and Herzegovina | 29 October 2021 | World Cup | Kazan, Russia | |
| 100m butterfly | 56.28 | sf | Lana Pudar | Bosnia and Herzegovina | 20 December 2021 | World Championships | Abu Dhabi, United Arab Emirates | |
| 200m butterfly | 2:04.55 | | Lana Pudar | Bosnia and Herzegovina | 7 December 2023 | European Championships | Otopeni, Romania | |
| 100m individual medley | 1:03.31 | | Amina Kajtaz | Orka Mostar | 8 November 2020 | - | Zagreb, Croatia | |
| 100m individual medley | 1:01.88 | not ratified or later rescinded | Amina Kajtaz | Mladost | 17 December 2021 | Croatian Championships | Rijeka, Croatia | |
| 200m individual medley | 2:11.49 | | Amina Kajtaz | Orka Mostar | 12 November 2022 | Mladost Meet | Zagreb, Croatia | |
| 400m individual medley | 4:41.63 | h | Iman Avdić | Bosnia and Herzegovina | 5 December 2023 | European Championships | Otopeni, Romania | |
| 4×50m freestyle relay | 1:50.14 | | Ajša Gušić (27.68); Zerina Vrabać (27.65); Amina Rozajać (28.52); Iman Avdić (26.29) | Sport Time | 29 December 2024 | Championships of Bosnia and Herzegovina | Banja Luka, Bosnia and Herzegovina | |
| 4×100m freestyle relay | 3:57.36 | | Ajša Gusić (59.24); Iman Avdić (57.31); Zerina Vrabac (58.41); Ajna Huremović (1:02.40) | Sport Time | 16 November 2025 | Championships of Bosnia and Herzegovina | Banja Luka, Bosnia and Herzegovina | |
| 4×200m freestyle relay | 8:42.39 | | Ajša Gusić (2:07.13); Ajna Huremović (2:12.72); Nejra Kovacević (2:18.65); Zerina Vrabac (2:03.89) | Sport Time | 15 November 2025 | Championships of Bosnia and Herzegovina | Banja Luka, Bosnia and Herzegovina | |
| 4×50m medley relay | 2:02.20 | | Lamija Medošević (29.07); Sara Samardžić (35.46); Hena Kapidžić (30.60); Nejra Karić (27.07) | GKVS Sarajevo | 29 December 2018 | Championships of Bosnia and Herzegovina | Sarajevo, Bosnia and Herzegovina | |
| 4×100m medley relay | 4:20.16 | | Iman Avdić (1:02.97); Leona Kastelić (1:18.76); Zerina Vrabac (1:00.32); Ajša Gusić (58.11) | Sport Time | 16 November 2025 | Championships of Bosnia and Herzegovina | Banja Luka, Bosnia and Herzegovina | |

Legend: # – Record awaiting ratification by Swimming Association of Bosnia and Herzegovina; WR – World record; ER – European record; e – equalled existing record;
Records not set in finals: h – heat; sf – semifinal; r – relay 1st leg; rh – relay heat 1st leg; b – B final; † – en route to final mark; so – swim-off; tt – time trial

=== Mixed relay ===
| Event | Time | | Name | Club | Date | Meet | Location | Ref |
|---|---|---|---|---|---|---|---|---|
| 4×50 m freestyle relay | 1:41.59 | | Arnel Dudić; Vedad Ramić; Negra Ahmetspahić; Iman Emšo | GKVS Sarajevo | 30 November 2013 | - | Sarajevo, Bosnia and Herzegovina | |
| 4×50 m freestyle relay | 1:36.16 | h, not ratified or later rescinded | Nikola Bjelajac (22.68); Adi Mešetović (21.91); Amina Kajtaz (26.15); Lamija Medošević (25.42) | Bosnia and Herzegovina | 12 December 2018 | World Championships | Hangzhou, China | |
| 4×50 m medley relay | 1:55.75 | | Vedad Ramić; Arnel Dudić; Negra Ahmetspahić; Iman Emšo | GKVS Sarajevo | 30 November 2013 | - | Sarajevo, Bosnia and Herzegovina | |

Legend: # – Record awaiting ratification by Swimming Association of Bosnia and Herzegovina; WR – World record; ER – European record; e – equalled existing record;
Records not set in finals: h – heat; so – swim-off
