= Bosnia and Herzegovina at the 2013 World Aquatics Championships =

- Flag of Bosnia and Herzegovina
- FINA code: BIH
- National federation: Swimming Association of Bosnia and Herzegovina

in Barcelona, Spain
- Competitors: 2 in 1 sports
- Medals Ranked -th: Gold 0 Silver 0 Bronze 0 Total 0

World Aquatics Championships appearances
- 1994; 1998; 2001; 2003; 2005; 2007; 2009; 2011; 2013; 2015; 2017; 2019; 2022; 2023; 2024

Other related appearances
- Yugoslavia (1973–1991)

Bosnia and Herzegovina competed at the 2013 World Aquatics Championships in Barcelona, Spain from 19 July to 4 August 2013.

== Swimming ==
Bosnia and Herzegovina qualified 3 quota places for the following swimming events:

Men

Athlete	Event	Heat		Semifinal		Final	
Athlete	Event	Time	Rank	Time	Rank	Time	Rank
Ensar Hajder	200 m freestyle	1:51.84 NR	42	did not advance			
Ensar Hajder	200 m individual medley	2:03.72 NR	37	did not advance			

Women

Athlete	Event	Heat		Semifinal		Final	
Athlete	Event	Time	Rank	Time	Rank	Time	Rank
Ivana Ninkovic	50 m breaststroke	32.32	33	did not advance			
Ivana Ninkovic	100 m breaststroke	1:12.39	45	did not advance			
