= Swimming at the 2012 European Aquatics Championships – Women's 50 metre breaststroke =

Women's 50 metre breaststroke at the 2012 European Aquatics Championships
- Dates: May 26, 2012 (heats and semifinals); May 27, 2012 (final)
- Competitors: 34 from 24 nations
- Winning time: 31.25

Medalists
gold medal	Petra Chocová	Czech Republic
silver medal	Sycerika McMahon	Ireland
bronze medal	Caroline Ruhnau	Germany

The women's 50 metre breaststroke competition of the swimming events at the 2012 European Aquatics Championships took place May 26 and 27. The heats and semifinals took place on May 26, the final on May 27.

== Records ==
Prior to the competition, the existing world, European and championship records were as follows.

	Name	Nation	Time	Location	Date
World record	Jessica Hardy	United States	29.80	Federal Way	August 7, 2009
European record	Yuliya Efimova	Russia	30.09	Rome	August 2, 2009
Championship record	Yuliya Efimova	Russia	30.29	Budapest	August 15, 2010

== Results ==
=== Heats ===
35 swimmers participated in 5 heats.

Rank	Heat	Lane	Name	Nationality	Time	Notes
1	3	4	Petra Chocová	Czech Republic	31.38	Q, NR
2	4	4	Caroline Ruhnau	Germany	31.44	Q
3	5	5	Sycerika McMahon	Ireland	31.65	Q
4	5	3	Valentina Artemyeva	Russia	31.83	Q
5	4	8	Hrafnhildur Lúthersdóttir	Iceland	31.85	Q, NR
6	4	3	Martina Moravciková	Czech Republic	31.95	Q
7	3	5	Concepcion Badillo Diaz	Spain	32.01	Q
8	2	5	Erla Dogg Haraldsdóttir	Iceland	32.18	Q
9	5	6	Ivana Ninković	Bosnia and Herzegovina	32.19	Q, NR
10	5	7	Chiara Boggiatto	Italy	32.19	Q
11	3	7	Jenna Laukkanen	Finland	32.20	Q
12	3	1	Mariya Liver	Ukraine	32.27	Q
13	3	3	Katharina Stiberg	Norway	32.29	Q
14	3	6	Vanessa Grimberg	Germany	32.29	Q
15	4	2	Anastasia Christoforou	Cyprus	32.45	Q
16	3	2	Ana Pinho Rodrigues	Portugal	32.49	Q
17	4	7	Ewa Scieszko	Poland	32.55	
18	5	2	Anna Sztankovics	Hungary	32.56	
19	4	6	Tjasa Vozel	Slovenia	32.59	
20	4	5	Lisa Fissneider	Italy	32.70	
21	5	1	Dilara Buse Günaydin	Turkey	32.78	
22	5	8	Zuzana Mimovicová	Slovakia	32.81	
23	3	8	Ceren Dilek	Turkey	33.08	
24	2	8	Maria Georgia Michalaka	Greece	33.14	
25	2	4	Evelina Aizpuriete	Latvia	33.11	
26	2	3	Tatiana Chisca	Moldova	33.18	
27	1	4	Raminta Dvariškytė	Lithuania	33.24	
28	4	1	Fiona Doyle	Ireland	33.46	
29	1	3	Maria Harutjunjan	Estonia	33.55	
30	2	2	Irina Novikova	Russia	33.57	
31	2	7	Vangelina Draganova	Bulgaria	33.72	
32	1	5	Anastasiya Malyavina	Ukraine	33.87	
33	2	6	Evghenia Tanasienco	Moldova	34.71	
34	2	1	Helena Pikhartová	Czech Republic	35.24	
	5	4	Dorothea Brandt	Germany	DNS	

=== Semifinals ===
The eight fastest swimmers advanced to the final.

==== Semifinal 1 ====
Rank	Lane	Name	Nationality	Time	Notes
1	5	Valentina Artemyeva	Russia	31.52	Q
2	4	Caroline Ruhnau	Germany	31.59	Q
3	3	Martina Moravciková	Czech Republic	31.96	
3	7	Mariya Liver	Ukraine	31.96	
5	8	Ana Pinho Rodrigues	Portugal	31.98	
6	6	Erla Dogg Haraldsdóttir	Iceland	32.27	
7	1	Vanessa Grimberg	Germany	32.41	
8	2	Chiara Boggiatto	Italy	32.60	

==== Semifinal 2 ====
Rank	Lane	Name	Nationality	Time	Notes
1	4	Petra Chocová	Czech Republic	31.44	Q
2	5	Sycerika McMahon	Ireland	31.51	Q
3	6	Concepcion Badillo Diaz	Spain	31.66	Q
4	1	Katharina Stiberg	Norway	31.84	Q
5	3	Hrafnhildur Lúthersdóttir	Iceland	31.95	Q
6	8	Anastasia Christoforou	Cyprus	31.98	
7	2	Ivana Ninković	Bosnia and Herzegovina	32.26	
8	7	Jenna Laukkanen	Finland	32.26	

==== Swim-off ====
A swim-off was needed to determine the last participant in the final.

Rank	Lane	Name	Nationality	Time	Notes
1	4	Martina Moravciková	Czech Republic	31.70	Q
2	5	Mariya Liver	Ukraine	32.04	

=== Final ===
The final was held at 17:09.

Rank	Lane	Name	Nationality	Time	Notes
1st place, gold medalist(s)	4	Petra Chocová	Czech Republic	31.25	NR
2nd place, silver medalist(s)	5	Sycerika McMahon	Ireland	31.27	NR
3rd place, bronze medalist(s)	6	Caroline Ruhnau	Germany	31.35	
4	2	Concepcion Badillo Diaz	Spain	31.69	
5	3	Valentina Artemyeva	Russia	31.70	
6	7	Katharina Stiberg	Norway	31.95	
7	8	Martina Moravciková	Czech Republic	32.05	
8	1	Hrafnhildur Lúthersdóttir	Iceland	32.25	
