= Bosnia and Herzegovina at the 2019 World Aquatics Championships =

- Flag of Bosnia and Herzegovina
- FINA code: BIH
- National federation: Swimming Association of Bosnia and Herzegovina

in Gwangju, South Korea
- Medals: Gold 0 Silver 0 Bronze 0 Total 0

World Aquatics Championships appearances
- 1994; 1998; 2001; 2003; 2005; 2007; 2009; 2011; 2013; 2015; 2017; 2019; 2022; 2023; 2024

Other related appearances
- Yugoslavia (1973–1991)

Bosnia and Herzegovina competed at the 2019 World Aquatics Championships in Gwangju, South Korea from 12 to 28 July.

== Swimming ==
Bosnia and Herzegovina entered four swimmers.

Men

Athlete	Event	Heat		Semifinal		Final	
Athlete	Event	Time	Rank	Time	Rank	Time	Rank
Mihajlo Čeprkalo	50 m butterfly	24.59	47	did not advance			
Mihajlo Čeprkalo	100 m butterfly	53.52	31	did not advance			
Marko Kovačić	200 m freestyle	1:51.78	45	did not advance			
Emir Muratović	50 m freestyle	22.56	=34	did not advance			
Emir Muratović	100 m freestyle	49.59	=35	did not advance			
Emir Muratović	50 m backstroke	25.95	=37	did not advance			

Women

Athlete	Event	Heat		Semifinal		Final	
Athlete	Event	Time	Rank	Time	Rank	Time	Rank
Amina Kajtaz	100 m butterfly	59.08	22	did not advance			
Amina Kajtaz	200 m butterfly	2:13.70	23	did not advance			
