= Bosnia and Herzegovina at the 2024 World Aquatics Championships =

- Flag of Bosnia and Herzegovina
- FINA code: BIH
- National federation: Swimming Association of Bosnia and Herzegovina

in Doha, Qatar
- Competitors: 3 in 1 sport
- Medals Ranked 34th: Gold 0 Silver 0 Bronze 1 Total 1

World Aquatics Championships appearances
- 1994; 1998; 2001; 2003; 2005; 2007; 2009; 2011; 2013; 2015; 2017; 2019; 2022; 2023; 2024

Other related appearances
- Yugoslavia (1973–1991)

Bosnia and Herzegovina competed at the 2024 World Aquatics Championships in Doha, Qatar from 2 to 18 February.

== Medalists ==
Medal	Name	Sport	Event	Date
3rd place, bronze medalist(s)	Lana Pudar	Swimming	Women's 200 metre butterfly	15 February 2024

== Competitors ==
The following is the list of competitors in the Championships.

Sport	Men	Women	Total
Swimming	2	1	3
Total	2	1	3

== Swimming ==
Bosnia and Herzegovina entered 3 swimmers.

Men

Athlete	Event	Heat		Semifinal		Final	
Athlete	Event	Time	Rank	Time	Rank	Time	Rank
Adi Mešetović	50 metre freestyle	23.12	43	Did not advance			
Adi Mešetović	100 metre freestyle	51.47	47	Did not advance			
Dino Sirotanović	50 metre backstroke	26.06	25	Did not advance			
Dino Sirotanović	100 metre backstroke	58.81	44	Did not advance			

Women

Athlete	Event	Heat		Semifinal		Final	
Athlete	Event	Time	Rank	Time	Rank	Time	Rank
Lana Pudar	200 metre butterfly	2:11.05	8 Q	2:09.42	8 Q	2:07.92	3rd place, bronze medalist(s)
