= Bosnia and Herzegovina at the 2022 World Aquatics Championships =

- Flag of Bosnia and Herzegovina
- FINA code: BIH
- National federation: Swimming Association of Bosnia and Herzegovina

in Budapest, Hungary
- Competitors: 2 in 1 sport
- Medals: Gold 0 Silver 0 Bronze 0 Total 0

World Aquatics Championships appearances
- 1994; 1998; 2001; 2003; 2005; 2007; 2009; 2011; 2013; 2015; 2017; 2019; 2022; 2023; 2024

Other related appearances
- Yugoslavia (1973–1991)

Bosnia and Herzegovina competed at the 2022 World Aquatics Championships in Budapest, Hungary from 18 June to 3 July.

== Swimming ==
Swimmers from Bosnia and Herzegovina have achieved qualifying standards in the following events.

Athlete	Event	Heat		Semifinal		Final	
Athlete	Event	Time	Rank	Time	Rank	Time	Rank
Nikola Bjelajac	Men's 50 m freestyle	23.42	54	did not advance			
Lana Pudar	Women's 50 m butterfly	27.14	29	did not advance			
Lana Pudar	Women's 100 m butterfly	58.90	13 Q	57.67	7 Q	58.44	8
Lana Pudar	Women's 200 m butterfly	2:10.20	12 Q	2:07.58 NR	4 Q	2:07.85	6
