= Swimming at the 2012 European Aquatics Championships – Women's 200 metre breaststroke =

Women's 200 metre breaststroke at the 2012 European Aquatics Championships
- Dates: May 24, 2012 (heats and semifinals); May 25, 2012 (final)
- Competitors: 35 from 23 nations
- Winning time: 2:26.91

Medalists
gold medal	Sara Nordenstam	Norway
silver medal	Irina Novikova	Russia
bronze medal	Sarah Poewe	Germany

The women's 200 metre breaststroke competition of the swimming events at the 2012 European Aquatics Championships took place May 24 and 25. The heats and semifinals took place on May 24, the final on May 25.

== Records ==
Prior to the competition, the existing world, European and championship records were as follows.

	Name	Nation	Time	Location	Date
World record	Annamay Pierse	Canada	2:20.12	Rome	July 30, 2009
European record	Nađa Higl	Serbia	2:21.62	Rome	July 31, 2009
Championship record	Anastasia Chaun	Russia	2:23.50	Budapest	August 13, 2010

== Results ==
=== Heats ===
36 swimmers participated in 5 heats.

Rank	Heat	Lane	Name	Nationality	Time	Notes
1	4	5	Joline Höstman	Sweden	2:28.06	Q
2	4	4	Nađa Higl	Serbia	2:28.59	Q
3	5	4	Irina Novikova	Russia	2:29.19	Q
4	5	6	Sara Nordenstam	Norway	2:29.22	Q
5	4	3	Sarah Poewe	Germany	2:29.84	Q
6	3	4	Fanny Lecluyse	Belgium	2:30.17	Q
7	3	7	Martina Moravciková	Czech Republic	2:30.50	Q
8	4	6	Hrafnhildur Lúthersdóttir	Iceland	2:30.54	Q
9	5	3	Caroline Ruhnau	Germany	2:30.55	Q
10	4	2	Dilara Buse Günaydin	Turkey	2:31.38	Q
11	5	7	Tjasa Vozel	Slovenia	2:31.50	Q
12	3	6	Ganna Dzerkaľ	Ukraine	2:31.71	Q
13	4	1	Shani Stallard	Ireland	2:31.87	Q
13	5	1	Anna Sztankovics	Hungary	2:31.87	Q
15	2	3	Neza Marcun	Slovenia	2:32.07	Q
16	5	8	Fiona Doyle	Ireland	2:32.20	Q
17	3	1	Noora Laukkanen	Finland	2:32.21	
18	2	6	Alona Ribakova	Latvia	2:32.53	NR
19	4	7	Concepcion Badillo Diaz	Spain	2:32.69	
20	3	5	Chiara Boggiatto	Italy	2:32.73	
21	3	2	Jenna Laukkanen	Finland	2:33.33	
22	5	2	Tanja Šmid	Slovenia	2:33.38	
23	3	3	Vanessa Crimberg	Germany	2:33.59	
24	3	8	Raminta Dvariškytė	Lithuania	2:33.62	
25	5	5	Lisa Fissneider	Italy	2:33.79	
26	4	8	Anastasiya Malyavina	Ukraine	2:34.19	
27	2	5	Sandra Swierczewska	Austria	2:34.79	
28	1	4	Erla Dögg Haraldsdóttir	Iceland	2:36.25	
29	2	7	Mariya Liver	Ukraine	2:38.11	
30	2	4	Maria Georgia Michalaka	Greece	2:38.42	
31	1	5	Zuzana Mimovicová	Slovakia	2:39.52	
32	1	3	Vangelina Draganova	Bulgaria	2:39.97	
33	2	1	Evghenia Tanasienco	Moldova	2:40.15	
34	1	6	Tatiana Chisca	Moldova	2:41.49	
35	2	8	Helena Pikhartová	Czech Republic	2:42.01	
	2	2	Stina Gardell	Sweden	DNS	

=== Semifinals ===
The eight fastest swimmers advanced to the final.

==== Semifinal 1 ====
Rank	Lane	Name	Nationality	Time	Notes
1	5	Sara Nordenstam	Norway	2:27.91	Q
2	4	Nađa Higl	Serbia	2:28.28	Q
3	7	Ganna Dzerkaľ	Ukraine	2:28.88	Q
4	3	Fanny Lecluyse	Belgium	2:28.93	Q
5	6	Hrafnhildur Lúthersdóttir	Iceland	2:28.99	Q
6	1	Anna Sztankovics	Hungary	2:30.26	
7	2	Dilara Buse Günaydin	Turkey	2:30.70	
8	8	Fiona Doyle	Ireland	2:33.97	

==== Semifinal 2 ====
Rank	Lane	Name	Nationality	Time	Notes
1	5	Irina Novikova	Russia	2:26.39	Q
2	4	Joline Höstman	Sweden	2:27.89	Q
3	3	Sarah Poewe	Germany	2:28.72	Q
4	6	Martina Moravciková	Czech Republic	2:29.27	
5	2	Caroline Ruhnau	Germany	2:29.47	
6	7	Tjasa Vozel	Slovenia	2:29.86	
7	8	Neza Marcun	Slovenia	2:30.99	
8	1	Shani Stallard	Ireland	2:32.11	

=== Final ===
The final was held at 17:38.

Rank	Lane	Name	Nationality	Time	Notes
1st place, gold medalist(s)	3	Sara Nordenstam	Norway	2:26.91	
2nd place, silver medalist(s)	4	Irina Novikova	Russia	2:27.25	
3rd place, bronze medalist(s)	2	Sarah Poewe	Germany	2:27.80	
4	5	Joline Höstman	Sweden	2:27.87	
5	8	Hrafnhildur Lúthersdóttir	Iceland	2:27.92	
6	6	Nađa Higl	Serbia	2:28.24	
7	7	Ganna Dzerkaľ	Ukraine	2:28.37	
8	1	Fanny Lecluyse	Belgium	2:30.12	
