= Spenard =

Spenard may refer to:

- André Spénard (1950–2022), Canadian politician
- Joe Spenard (1879–1934), Canadian-born American businessman
- Thérèse Spénard, Canadian anti-poverty activist
- Spenard, Anchorage, a major neighborhood in Anchorage, Alaska, named for Joe Spenard
- Spenard Builders Supply, a chain of stores in Alaska selling construction and home improvement supplies, founded in Spenard in the 1950s
- Lake Spenard, a lake in the southwestern corner of Spenard, part of Lake Hood Seaplane Base
- "Spenard divorce", a popular colloquialism in Alaska describing spousal homicide
