= Bosnia and Herzegovina at the 2017 World Aquatics Championships =

- Flag of Bosnia and Herzegovina
- FINA code: BIH
- National federation: Swimming Association of Bosnia and Herzegovina

in Budapest, Hungary
- Competitors: 3 in 1 sport
- Medals: Gold 0 Silver 0 Bronze 0 Total 0

World Aquatics Championships appearances
- 1994; 1998; 2001; 2003; 2005; 2007; 2009; 2011; 2013; 2015; 2017; 2019; 2022; 2023; 2024

Other related appearances
- Yugoslavia (1973–1991)

Bosnia and Herzegovina competed at the 2017 World Aquatics Championships in Budapest, Hungary from 14 July to 30 July.

== Swimming ==
Bosnian swimmers have achieved qualifying standards in the following events (up to a maximum of 2 swimmers in each event at the A-standard entry time, and 1 at the B-standard):

Athlete	Event	Heat		Semifinal		Final	
Athlete	Event	Time	Rank	Time	Rank	Time	Rank
Nikola Bjelajac	Men's 50 m freestyle	23.42	64	did not advance			
Adi Mešetović	Men's 50 m butterfly	24.58	40	did not advance			
Amina Kajtaz	Women's 50 m butterfly	27.35	33	did not advance			
Amina Kajtaz	Women's 100 m butterfly	1:00.77	28	did not advance			
