= Lydia Jacoby =

American swimmer

Personal information
- Full name: Lydia Alice Jacoby
- National team: United States
- Born: February 29, 2004 (age 22) Anchorage, Alaska, U.S.

Sport
- Sport: Swimming
- Strokes: Breaststroke, individual medley
- Club: Seward Tsunami Swim Club
- College team: University of Texas at Austin
Medal record
Women's swimming
Representing United States
Event	1st	2nd	3rd
Olympic Games	1	1	0
World Championships (LC)	1	0	1
World Championships (SC)	0	1	0
Swimming World Cup	0	3	1
Total	2	5	2
Olympic Games
Gold medal – first place	2020 Tokyo	100 m breaststroke
Silver medal – second place	2020 Tokyo	4×100 m medley
World Championships (LC)
Gold medal – first place	2023 Fukuoka	4×100 m medley
Bronze medal – third place	2023 Fukuoka	100 m breaststroke
World Championships (SC)
Silver medal – second place	2021 Abu Dhabi	4×50 m medley
Swimming World Cup
Silver medal – second place	2021 Berlin	50 m breaststroke
Silver medal – second place	2021 Budapest	100 m breaststroke
Silver medal – second place	2021 Budapest	50 m breaststroke
Bronze medal – third place	2021 Berlin	100 m breaststroke
U.S. Open Championships
Silver medal – second place	2020 Virtual	100 m breaststroke

Lydia Alice Jacoby OLY (born February 29, 2004) is an American professional swimmer. She was the first Alaskan to qualify for an Olympic Games in swimming, competing at the 2020 Summer Olympics in Tokyo in 2021, where she won the gold medal in the 100-meter breaststroke with a time of 1:04.95, which was the fastest time ever achieved by a female American swimmer in the event in the 17–18 age group. Later in the year, she was the overall highest scoring female American competitor at the 2021 FINA Swimming World Cup. In 2022, she became the fastest female American swimmer in history in the 100-yard breaststroke for the 17–18 age group with a national age group record time of 57.54 seconds. In 2023, she further lowered the record to a time of 57.45 seconds, then 57.29 seconds, and set a national age group record of 2:04.32 for the girls 17–18 age group in the 200-yard breaststroke. She is the 2023 NCAA Division I champion in the women's 100-yard breaststroke.

== Early life and education ==
Jacoby was born in Anchorage, Alaska and raised in Seward, Alaska. She started swimming when she was six years old with her local swim team, the Seward Tsunami Swim Club. By the time Jacoby was 12 years old, she had broken her first Alaska state record in swimming. For high school, she started attending Seward High School in Seward in 2018, where she swam as part of the high school swim team, setting high school state records for Alaska in the 100-yard breaststroke in both 2018 and 2019. In 2020, she opted not to compete on the school swim team due to the COVID-19 pandemic, instead choosing to be home-schooled.

At the end of the 2020 year, Jacoby committed to swimming in college for the University of Texas at Austin starting in the fall of 2022. One of the college majors she expressed interest in at the time of committing to the University of Texas was fashion design. She returned to Seward High School in the fall of 2021 for her senior year. She finished off her senior year swimming scholastically for Seward High School as well and graduated as valedictorian of her high school class. She also served on her high school newspaper as a columnist and appeared in Port City Players productions, theatre productions, more than once.

In the autumn of 2022, Jacoby started attending the University of Texas at Austin, majoring in textiles and apparel, and began competing collegiately for the Texas Longhorns.

=== Music career ===
Jacoby sang, wrote songs, and played double bass as part of a bluegrass band named the Snow River String Band for six years performing at the Anchorage Folk Festival multiple times prior to 2021 (when she turned 17 years old). In addition to bass and singing, Jacoby can play guitar and piano.

=== COVID-19 pandemic adaptations ===
During the COVID-19 pandemic, Jacoby was out of the pool for two months and found other forms of staying active including skiing and running with ice cleats. Jacoby and her father made a makeshift weight rack in the garage during the pandemic so she could continue lifting weights as well. When pools re-opened in Alaska, the pool in Seward remained temporarily closed so Jacoby practiced at Service High School in Anchorage with the Northern Lights Swim Club. Her mother, Leslie Jacoby, helped with commuting to the pool and renting an apartment to make swim practices.

== 2018–2019: State titles and making the U.S. Junior National Team ==
Jacoby first qualified for the U.S. Olympic Trials in late 2018 when she was 14 years old. This first qualification was in the 100-meter breaststroke. She swam her qualifying time at the year's U.S. Winter National Championships in Greensboro, North Carolina. That same year, she won titles in the 100-yard breaststroke and 200-yard individual medley at the Alaska High School State Championships. Her time of 2:09.31 in the 200-yard individual medley won her the state title in that event for girl's high school swimming. Her time of 1:03.11 in the 100-yard breaststroke won her the girl's high school state title in that event as well as setting a new Alaska state record. The following year, she broke the Alaska state record she set in the girl's 100-yard breaststroke in 2018 with a time of 1:00.61. Her swim also won her the title in the event at the 2019 Alaska State High School Championships. She took third in the state in the girl's 200-yard individual medley with a time of 2:09.83.

At the 2019 Alaska Age Group Championships, held in February 2019, Jacoby competed in seven individual events including winning the 100-yard breaststroke with a time of 1:02.68, the 200-yard breaststroke with a 2:28.65, and the 200-yard individual medley in 2:10.58. One month later, she competed in five individual events at the 2019 Northwest Speedo Sectionals swim meet held at King County Aquatic Center in Federal Way, Washington, including swimming a 1:00.42 in the 100-yard breaststroke to place second and finish less than three-tenths of a second behind first-place finisher Kaitlyn Dobler. Five months later, in August, she won the junior national champion title in the 100-meter breaststroke at the Speedo Junior National Championships. Based on her results, she was named to the U.S. Junior National Team later in 2019. For the whole 2019 year, Jacoby ranked 16th in the United States for the 100-meter breaststroke.

== 2020–2021: Olympic champion at 17 years of age ==
In 2020 Jacoby qualified for the U.S. Olympic Trials in swimming in two events for the first time, the 100-meter and 200-meter breaststroke events. At the time she was one of 12 swimmers in the history of the state of Alaska to qualify for the U.S. Olympic Trials in swimming. Towards the beginning of the COVID-19 pandemic, in March 2020, she expressed relief about the 2020 Olympic Games being postponed due to unfair conditions created with some pools closed and others open, sharing her perspective with Anchorage Daily News, "I feel like I'm in a good place now, because when they closed the pool I was really concerned about the Olympics and the trials — it's not a fair environment, because not everybody's pools are closed." On November 6, 2020, at the 2020 Kenai Peninsula Virtual Invite, Jacoby swam a personal best time and set a new record for the state of Alaska in the 100-yard breaststroke with a time of 1:00.16.

At the 2020 U.S. Open Swimming Championships, the only international championships hosted by USA Swimming in 2020 and held in December in San Antonio, Texas when Jacoby was 16 years old, she won the silver medal in the 100-meter breaststroke with a personal best time of 1:07.57, finishing only behind gold medalist Anna Elendt of Germany, which made her the highest ranking female American swimmer at the Championships in the event. The time became the second fastest time swam by an American female in the race in the 15–16 age group in history behind Megan Quann who won the gold medal in the event at the 2000 Summer Olympics at 16 years of age with a time of 1:07.05. Jacoby dropped time off her 200-meter breaststroke swim at the 2020 U.S. Open as well, a total drop of about five seconds resulting in a new personal record time of 2:32.36 and a thirteenth-place finish. Based on her time of 1:07.57 in the 100-meter breaststroke, she ranked as the third-fastest junior American female performer in the event for the year and was named to the 2021 roster for the U.S. Junior National swim team in the 100-meter breaststroke in affiliation with the club team she first started swimming with, the Seward Tsunami Swim Club. At the 2021 Northern Lights Swim Club Winter Time Trial in January 2021, Jacoby broke the minute mark in her 100-yard breaststroke swimming a time of 59.87. By the end of March 2021, Jacoby lowered her 100-yard breaststroke time to a 59.35 and her 200-yard breaststroke to a 2:08.61.

=== 2021 TYR Pro Swim Series – Mission Viejo ===
NBC Sports: 100m breaststroke at Mission Viejo

In April 2021, less than two months after she turned 17 years old, Jacoby took second place in the finals of the 100-meter long course breaststroke at the TYR Pro Swim Series swim meet in Mission Viejo, California with a personal record time of 1:06.38. She finished behind 2016 Olympic gold medalist and world record holder in the event, Lilly King, and before 2019 Pan American Games gold medalist in the event Annie Lazor. Jacoby's swim garnered press coverage from NBC Sports, which featured her swim as a story highlight of the competition heading into the 2020 Olympic Trials in swimming in June 2021. Jacoby's swim was the sixth-fastest time in the world for women in the event so far in the 2021 year. It also catapulted her to the mark of the 14th fastest U.S. female swimmer in the event in history, and third fastest in the event in history for the U.S. females 17–18 age group. In the same meet, she lowered her personal record in the 200-meter breaststroke by almost five seconds, swimming a time of 2:27.39 to win the b-final. She also competed in the 200-meter individual medley, swimming a new personal record and finishing with a time of 2:29.38 in the preliminaries. Her times in the 100-meter breaststroke and 200-meter breaststroke were fast enough to secure her spot in both events for Wave II of the 2020 U.S. Olympic Trials.

=== 2020 US Olympic Trials build-up ===
Jacoby was one of two swimmers from Alaska to qualify for the 2020 USA Swimming Olympic Trials. She was the sole female qualifier from the state, while John Heaphy from Eagle River was the sole male qualifier. Both Jacoby and Heaphy were state champions in both the 100-yard breaststroke and 200-yard individual medley in 2018. There was much anticipation building up to the Olympic Trials as no Alaskan had made the USA Olympic Team in swimming, meaning if Jacoby and/or Heaphy made the team they would be the first Alaskan(s) to do so. On May 24, 2021, Jacoby was listed as a top three pick by SwimSwam in the women's 100-meter breaststroke for the 2020 Olympic Trials held in June 2021 due to the COVID-19 pandemic (the top 2 finishers qualify for the USA Olympic Team).

Building up to the Olympic Trials, Jacoby honed in on racing two events during a given meet at the 2021 Alaska Swimming Junior Olympics Championships from June 3–6, 2021 by swimming the short course 100-yard breaststroke and 200-yard breaststroke events for Seward Tsunami Swim Club. On the morning on Friday June 4, 2021, Jacoby swam the 2nd fastest time in all prelims heats of the 15 & over girls 100-yard breaststroke qualifying for the finals in the evening of the same day with a time of 1:04.29. In the evening, Jacoby swam the fastest time in the 15 & over girls 100-yard breaststroke finals with a time of 58.87 seconds, swimming the first 50 yards in a time of 28.12 seconds and the second 50 yards in a time of 30.75 seconds. The next day, Saturday June 5, 2021, Jacoby and Heaphy received special recognition following morning warm-ups and before the first of the day's swimming events for their accomplishment of making the US Olympic Trials. During prelims in the morning session Jacoby swam the fastest time in the girls 15 & over 200-yard breaststroke heats with a time of 2:15.09. Following warm-ups and before the first event of finals in the evening of the same day, Heaphy and Jacoby were featured in video form providing supportive messages to the swimmers of the 2021 Alaska Junior Olympics Championships. Jacoby was not listed on the heat sheets for the finals of the girls 15 and over 200-yard breaststroke and she decided to not swim in the finals of the event.

On June 10, 2021, Jacoby was called a "Dark Horse Threat" to the women's 200-meter breaststroke event for the upcoming US Olympic Trials by SwimSwam in part due her 15th place seed time and in part due to her stroke's similarity to the stroke of Leisel Jones. The same day, NBC Sports previewed the women's swimming events for the USA Olympic Trials, highlighting swims by USA women from 2016 to the article's publishing date on June 10, 2021. Ordering best times swum during the 2021 year pre-Olympic Trials, Jacoby was NBC Sports's 2nd place designee for the women's 100-meter breaststroke event at the Olympic Trials. Two days later, the Peninsula Clarion released an estimate of 50 people from her coach for the number of people from Alaska traveling to watch her race in-person.

=== 2020 USA Swimming Olympic Trials ===
In the morning on day two of the Olympic Trials, June 14, 2021, Jacoby competed in the prelims of the 100-meter breaststroke, swimming a 1:06.40 and coming in as the fourth-fastest swim for all heats. With her swim, she became the second Alaskan to advance beyond preliminaries to the next round of competition, semi-finals or finals, at a US Olympic Trials in swimming. In the evening of the same day, she swam a 1:05.71 in the semi-finals, ranking as number three for the semi-finals heats and advancing to the final. Her swim moved her up in the global rankings to fourth-fastest swimmer so far in 2021 for the event and broke the national age group record of 1:05.75 for the long course 100-meter breaststroke in the girls 17–18 age group set by Kasey Carlson at the 2009 World Championships in Rome to win the bronze medal. Lilly King's respect for Jacoby and Jacoby's leap day (February 29) birthday were covered in addition to Jacoby winning her semi-final heat in the NBC telecast of day two semi-finals and finals of the Olympic Trials. Press coverage followed Jacoby's semi-final win and both local and national news outlets mentioned her potential of making the 2020 Summer Olympics in Tokyo.

On day three, in the evening final of the 100-meter breaststroke, Jacoby swam a personal best time of 1:05.28 and placed second. With this swim, 17-year-old Jacoby qualified for her first US Olympic Team in the 100-meter breaststroke, and lowered her national age group record from the day before. She became the first swimmer from Alaska to qualify for an Olympic Games. Jacoby's swim also made her the second-fastest swimmer in the world for the 2021 year up to that point in the women's long course 100-meter breaststroke and the eighth fastest swimmer all-time globally for the event. In addition to being the first Alaskan swimmer to qualify for an Olympic Games, she was the second Alaskan in any sport to qualify to compete in the 2020 Olympics and the tenth Alaska-born Summer Olympian. In the morning on day five of competition, Jacoby swam a 2:31.29 in the prelims of the 200-meter breaststroke, ranked 26th, and did not qualify for the semi-finals.

=== 2020 Summer Olympics ===
2020 Summer Olympics
Gold medal – first place	100 m breaststroke	1:04.95 (NAG)
Silver medal – second place	4×100 m medley relay	3:51.73

For her first Olympic Games, Jacoby was one of eleven teenage swimmers on the USA Olympic Swimming Team for the 2020 Summer Olympics in Tokyo, Japan. She was one of ten teenage female swimmers to make the team. In the 100-meter breaststroke, she was one of 46 entrants in the event for the year's Olympic Games. In the preliminaries of the 100-meter breaststroke, on the second day of swimming competition, she finished in a time of 1:05.52. Overall she ranked second in the prelims, behind South African Tatjana Schoenmaker who swam a 1:04.82 and ahead of American teammate Lilly King who finished with a time of 1:05.55. Jacoby swam a 1:05.72 in the semi-finals of the event the following day and advanced to the final ranking third overall. On the fourth day, she swam a time of 1:04.95 in the final and won the gold medal at 17 years, 149 days of age. Her time was the fastest ever swum by a female American swimmer younger than 18 years of age, setting a new national age group record, abbreviated NAG, for American girls in the 17–18-year-old age group. Her medal was the first gold medal won by an American woman in swimming at the 2020 Olympics. It was also the first medal won by an Alaska-born swimmer at an Olympic Games.

Based on her results in the 100-meter breaststroke as the fastest female American in the event at the Olympic Games, Jacoby was selected to swim the breaststroke leg of the 4×100-meter mixed medley relay in the final, where she helped the relay place fifth in a time of 3:40.58 alongside finals relay teammates Ryan Murphy, Torri Huske, and Caeleb Dressel. For her 100-meter portion of the relay, Jacoby swam a 1:05.09 without her goggles as they came off her eyes when she dove into the pool to start her swim. She improved upon her split time in the final of the 4×100-meter medley relay, swimming a 1:05.03 for the breaststroke leg of the relay, and helping win a silver medal as part of the finals relay consisting of her, Regan Smith, Torri Huske, and Abbey Weitzeil, in a time of 3:51.73. Jacoby's swims caught the attention of Time magazine who acknowledged her as a "fresh face" highlight of the US swim team at the Olympic Games.

=== Post-Olympic Games decompression ===
Returning to Seward, Alaska following the Olympic Games, Jacoby was welcomed home on August 5 with a parade and took a few weeks off from swimming to rest. In September, Jacoby was named to the 2021–2022 USA Swimming National Team in the 100-meter breaststroke based on her performances earlier in 2021, it was the first time she made the US National Team, which is open to all ages.

==== 2021 FINA Swimming World Cup ====
2021 World Cup – Berlin
Silver medal – second place	50 m breaststroke	30.04
Bronze medal – third place	100 m breaststroke	1:05.20

Taking full advantage of her national team status, Jacoby competed in the 2021 FINA Swimming World Cup stop in Berlin, Germany on October 1, swimming personal best times in multiple short course meters events including a 2:24.99 in the 200-meter breaststroke. Jacoby had a breakthrough in the short course 100-meter breaststroke race also at the World Cup stop in Berlin, swimming a time of 1:05.20, winning the bronze medal in the event, and ranking her as the 13th fastest female swimmer in the race in 2021 up to then. In her third event in Berlin, the 50-meter breaststroke, Jacoby won the silver medal in a personal best time of 30.04 seconds, finishing less than half a second after Anastasia Gorbenko of Israel. Jacoby was selected as one of a handful of competitors to participate in a press conference at the Berlin stop, with a picture of her at the press conference being featured on the FINA website.

Continuing on the World Cup circuit, Jacoby was highlighted as an American swimmer to watch in Budapest, Hungary at the second stop of the series by Swimming World and FINA for her 100-meter breaststroke. Her first day of competition in Budapest, October 7, Jacoby placed seventh in the 200-meter breaststroke with a time of 2:26.18. The second day in Budapest, Jacoby swam a 1:05.40 in the 100-meter breaststroke final, capturing the silver medal in the event behind Nika Godun of Russia. Jacoby broke 30 seconds for the first time in the final of the 50-meter breaststroke, winning the silver medal in the event with her time of 29.97 seconds. Jacoby ranked 13th amongst female competitors for her score of 86.1 points across all four World Cup stops, she competed at two of the four stops and also ranked as the highest scoring female American swimmer for the entire 2021 World Cup circuit.

==== Awards season ====
The beginning of the 2021 awards season overlapped a bit with Jacoby competing at the 2021 FINA Swimming World Cup, receiving her first nomination in late September, prior to the commencing of World Cup competition, for the James E. Sullivan Award. She joined skier Tommy Moe and bowler Ron Mohr as one of only a few Alaskans to ever be nominated for the accolade, though they tied in the sense that none of them, including Jacoby, won the award and the highest level achieved in the nomination process was finalist for the award.

Following the first two World Cup stops, in mid-October, she was announced as a nominee for three Golden Goggle Awards, presented annually by the USA Swimming Foundation, in individual categories including "Breakout Performer of the Year", "Female Race of the Year", and "Female Athlete of the Year". She was one of four swimmers who represented the United States at the 2020 Summer Olympics to receive three Golden Goggle Award nominations, with the other three being Katie Ledecky, Caeleb Dressel, and Bobby Finke. Jacoby's nomination for "Breakout Performer of the Year" was inspired by her gold and silver medal performances at the Olympic Games as well as the historical significance of her being the first Olympic swimmer produced by the state of Alaska. Her gold-medal-winning performance in the 100-meter breaststroke earned her the nomination for the "Female Race of the Year" for triumphing as a 17-year-old in a field of competitors composed of primarily of well-established senior swimmers including the current world record-holder and 2016 Olympic Games gold medalist in the event. In addition to the reasons for her nominations for the two other awards, Jacoby was nominated for "Female Athlete of Year" for her silver-medal-win in the women's medley relay as well as contributing to making history for humankind by racing in the first-ever event at the Olympic Games in the sport of swimming in which men and women competed together, the mixed 100-meter medley relay, and overcoming the in-race adversity of swimming without goggles to split one of her fastest times swimming 100-meters of breaststroke. On December 7, Jacoby won the Golden Goggle Awards for "Breakout Performer of the Year" and "Female Race of the Year".

After receiving her awards nominations, Jacoby balanced the recognition out with some last high school competition, winning state titles in the 100-yard breaststroke, 59.66 seconds, and 200-yard individual medley, 2:05.70, for her high school senior, final, year of scholastic swimming for Seward High School at the 2021 Alaska State Swim and Dive Championship in early November. Her time of 59.66 seconds in the 100-yard breaststroke set a new Alaska state high school record in the event, marking the first time in the history of the state of Alaska that a female swimmer swum the 100-yard breaststroke in less than one minute at a high school state Championship competition, and her accomplishments at the Championship earned her the "Outstanding Female Swimmer" award. Jacoby edged out 2020 Olympian Jillian Crooks for the award, a swimmer from the Cayman Islands who moved to Alaska following the 2020 Summer Olympics to test out the American, and specifically Alaskan, competitive swimming scene. Following her state-title-winning performances, Arena announced via SwimSwam and Swimming World on November 19 that it had signed a professional sponsorship deal with Jacoby.

=== 2021 World Short Course Championships ===
2021 World Championships (SC)
Silver medal – second place	4×50 m medley	1:43.61

Not to have her progress halted by the awards season, Jacoby entered to compete in the 50-meter breaststroke and 100-meter breaststroke individual events at the 2021 World Short Course Championships in Abu Dhabi, United Arab Emirates starting on December 16. The United States World Championships team announcement was number two for week of November 1, 2021, as part of Swimming World's "The Week That Was" honor. She trained at the Championships venue, Etihad Arena, with her teammates in the days leading up to the start competition.

Day one of competition, Jacoby ranked ninth in the prelims heats of the 50-meter breaststroke, qualifying for the semi-finals later in the day with her time of 30.16 seconds. In the semi-finals, she was the only swimmer from the United States to compete and ranked thirteenth with a time of 30.21 seconds, not qualifying for the final. In the final of the 4×50-meter medley relay on day two, she split a 29.62 for the breaststroke leg of the relay, helping achieve a 1:43.61 and win the silver medal with finals relay teammates Rhyan White, Claire Curzan, and Abbey Weitzeil. The following day, December 18, she and teammate Katie Grimes withdrew from the championships in regard to procedures put in place due to the COVID-19 pandemic.

== 2022–2024: Senior career beginnings ==
Less than one week after turning 18 years old, Jacoby placed third in the 100-meter breaststroke at the 2022 Pro Swim Series in Westmont, Illinois with a time of 1:06.87. In the 200-meter breaststroke, she placed third in the final with a 2:28.22. On the second day of the 2022 USA Swimming International Team Trials in Greensboro, North Carolina in late April, she ranked seventh in the prelims heats of the 200-meter breaststroke, swimming a 2:29.28 to qualify for the final. In the final, she placed fifth with a personal best time of 2:26.60. One day later, she advanced to the final of the 50-meter breaststroke ranking third with a time of 31.08 seconds. She swam a personal best time of 30.35 seconds in the final, placing third. The following day, she ranked fourth with a time of 1:07.58 in the prelims heats of the 100-meter breaststroke, qualifying for the evening final. She finished in 1:06.21 in the final, placing fourth. The following month, she swam a personal best time of 2:25.98 in the 200-meter breaststroke at the 2022 Mare Nostrum stop in Monaco, winning the gold medal and finishing less than half a second ahead of silver medalist in the event Sophie Hansson of Sweden. Two Mare Nostrum stops later, in Canet-en-Roussillon, France, she lowered her personal best time in the 50-meter breaststroke to 30.20 seconds, finishing five-hundredths of a second ahead of Lara van Niekerk of South Africa to win the gold medal.

=== Freshman collegiate season ===
NAG progression (girls 17–18)
Record	Time	Date
100 yd breaststroke	57.54	December 2, 2022
100 yd breaststroke	57.45	January 27, 2023
100 yd breaststroke	57.29	February 24, 2023
200 yd breaststroke	2:04.32	February 25, 2023

At the first dual meet of her collegiate career, a double dual meet against the Indiana Hoosiers and the Texas A&M Aggies on October 21 her first year (first year), Jacoby placed second in the 100-yard breaststroke with a time of 59.93 seconds and third in the 200-yard breaststroke with a time of 2:11.31 for her individual events to help her team, the Texas Longhorns, win both dual meets. Seven days later, in the morning preliminaries of the 200-meter breaststroke at the 2022 Swimming World Cup in Toronto, Canada, Jacoby qualified for the final ranking seventh with a personal best time of 2:24.23, which marked a drop of 0.76 seconds from her previous best time of 2:24.99. Approximately 40 minutes later, she swam a personal best time of 1:04.68 in the 100-meter individual medley and placed twenty-seventh. In the evening final of the 200-meter breaststroke, she dropped 1.87 seconds from her personal best time in the morning session, placing sixth with a time of 2:22.36. The following morning, she swam a personal best time of 1:04.70 in the preliminaries of the 100-meter breaststroke, lowering her former personal best time by 0.50 seconds and qualifying for the final ranking third. She further improved her personal best time in the final, placing fourth with a time of 1:04.62 that was 1.67 seconds slower than gold medalist and 2012 Olympic champion at 15 years of age in the 100-meter breaststroke Rūta Meilutytė of Lithuania.

Six days after the 2022 Swimming World Cup Toronto, Jacoby placed third in the 100-yard breaststroke in a dual meet against the Virginia Cavaliers with a time of 58.96 seconds, less than nine-tenths of a second behind two junior-year (third-year) swimmers, each of whom was 21 years of age (three years older than Jacoby). The following day, she achieved a win in the 200-yard breaststroke with a time of 2:09.19, which marked her first win in an individual event in her collegiate career and contributed to a win for her team over the University of Virginia. On December 1, at the 2022 Minnesota Invitational, she achieved a personal best time in the 200-yard individual medley with a mark of 2:05.37, which tied her for thirty-fifth in rank overall. The following day, she became the fastest female American swimmer in the 100-yard breaststroke in history for the 17–18 age group with a national age group record (NAG) time of 57.54 seconds, which earned her second-place by 0.06 seconds at the Invitational and marked her first sub-58 seconds time in the event. On the final day of the Invitational, December 3, she won the 200-yard breaststroke with a personal best time of 2:07.14. She followed up her national age group record of 57.54 seconds seven days later with her second-ever sub-58-second time in the 100-yard breaststroke at the 2022 Winter Junior National Championships, winning the event with a time of 57.76 seconds. The next, and final, evening, she won the 200-yard breaststroke with a personal best time of 2:06.81.

In her first competition of 2023, a double dual meet against Alabama Crimson Tide and Ohio State Buckeyes in January in Tuscaloosa, Alabama, Jacoby won both of her individual events, finishing first with a time of 59.21 seconds in the 100-yard breaststroke and a time of 2:11.14 in the 200-yard breaststroke. In her school's second-to-last dual meet for the season, against the NC State Wolfpack, she improved upon her national age group record for the 100-yard breaststroke, finishing in a personal best time of 57.45 seconds to win the event. She followed up with a personal best time in the 200-yard breaststroke the next day, January 28, finishing first in 2:06.66. The final dual meet, held the following week against the SMU Mustangs, she helped contribute four points towards a dual meet-win for her school with a second-place finish in the 4×50-yard medley relay in 1:40.20, splitting a 26.56 for the breaststroke leg of the relay.

==== 2023 Collegiate championships ====
2023 NCAA Championships
Gold medal – first place	100 yd breaststroke	57.03
Bronze medal – third place	4×100 yd medley	3:25.18

For her first individual event of her freshman Big 12 Conference Championships, the 50-yard freestyle on the second day, Jacoby placed thirty-sixth with a personal best time of 24.34 seconds in the preliminaries. The next day, she lowered her national age group record in the 100-yard breaststroke final to a 57.29 and won her first conference title. The 57.29 was also a new Big 12 Conference and Championships record. The fourth and final day, she dropped 2.34 seconds off her personal best time in the 200-yard breaststroke to set her first national age group record in the event, with a 2:04.32 for the girls 17–18 age group, and win the conference title. At the 2023 NCAA Division I Championships the following month in Knoxville, Tennessee, she won the NCAA title in the 100-yard breaststroke on the third day of competition with a personal best time of 57.03 seconds. It marked the first time since 1988 that a female Texas Longhorns swimmer won the NCAA title in the 100-yard breaststroke. Later the same evening, she helped win the bronze medal in the 4×100-yard medley relay in 3:25.18, splitting a 56.78 for the breaststroke leg of the relay. The following day, she placed third in the consolation final, eleventh overall, in the 200-yard breaststroke with a 2:06.66. She was named as a Newcomer of the Year by the Big 12 Conference following her performances over the course of the season.

The following month, Jacoby won the 100-meter breaststroke at the 2023 TYR Pro Swim Series in Westmont, Illinois with a time of 1:06.09, which was an improvement of 0.78 seconds from her time at the same competition in 2022. She also won the 50-meter breaststroke, finishing first in the final with a time of 30.29 seconds on the fourth and final day. On May 18, she won the gold medal in the 200-meter breaststroke at the second stop of the 2023 Mare Nostrum with a personal best time of 2:24.03.

=== 2024 ===
Jacoby competed at the United States Olympic trials held in Indianapolis and aimed to qualify for her second consecutive Olympics. She finished third in the 100-meter breaststroke behind Lilly King and Emma Weber, and missed her opportunity to make it onto the Olympic team and was not able to defend her title.

== International championships (50 m) ==
Meet	100 breaststroke	200 breaststroke	4×100 medley	4×100 mixed medley
USOC 2020 (age: 16)	(silver) (1:07.57)	13th (2:32.36)	—N/a	—N/a
OG 2020 (age: 17)	(gold) (1:04.95, girls 17–18 NAG)		(silver) (split 1:05.03, br leg)	5th (split 1:05.09, br leg)

== International championships (25 m) ==
Meet	50 breaststroke	100 breaststroke	4×50 medley
WC 2021 (age: 17)	13th (30.21)	DNS (NT)	(silver) (split 29.62, br leg)

== Personal best times ==
=== Long course meters (50 m pool) ===
Event	Time	Meet	Location	Date	Age	Note(s)	Ref
50 m breaststroke	30.20	2022 Mare Nostrum – Canet	Canet-en-Roussillon, France	May 29, 2022	18		
100 m breaststroke	1:04.95	2020 Summer Olympics	Tokyo, Japan	July 27, 2021	17	NAG	
200 m breaststroke	2:24.03	2023 Mare Nostrum – Barcelona	Barcelona, Spain	May 18, 2023	19		
200 m individual medley	2:29.38	2021 TYR Pro Swim Series – Mission Viejo	Mission Viejo, California	April 10, 2021	17		

Legend: e – equalled existing record; NAG – USA Swimming National Age Group record (girls 17–18);
Records not set in finals: h – heat; sf – semifinal; r – relay 1st leg; rh – relay heat 1st leg; b – B final; † – en route to final mark; so – swim-off; tt – time trial

=== Short course meters (25 m pool) ===
Event	Time		Meet	Location	Date	Age	Ref
50 m breaststroke	29.97		2021 FINA Swimming World Cup	Budapest, Hungary	October 9, 2021	17	
100 m breaststroke	1:04.62		2022 FINA Swimming World Cup	Toronto, Canada	October 29, 2022	18	
200 m breaststroke	2:22.36		2022 FINA Swimming World Cup	Toronto, Canada	October 28, 2022	18	
100 m individual medley	1:04.68	h	2022 FINA Swimming World Cup	Toronto, Canada	October 28, 2022	18	

Legend: h – preliminary heat

=== Short course yards (25 yd pool) ===
Event	Time		Meet	Location	Date	Age	Notes	Ref
100 yd breaststroke	57.03		2023 NCAA Division I Championships	Knoxville, Tennessee	March 17, 2023	19		
200 yd breaststroke	2:04.32		2023 Big 12 Conference Championships	Austin, Texas	February 25, 2023	18	NAG	
200 yd individual medley	2:05.37	h	2022 Minnesota Invitational	Minneapolis, Minnesota	December 1, 2022	18		

Legend: e – equalled existing record; NAG – USA Swimming National Age Group record (girls 17–18);
Records not set in finals: h – heat; sf – semifinal; r – relay 1st leg; rh – relay heat 1st leg; b – B final; † – en route to final mark; so – swim-off; tt – time trial

== Swimming World Cup circuits ==
The following medals Jacoby has won at Swimming World Cup circuits.

Edition	Gold medals	Silver medals	Bronze medals	Total
2021	0	3	1	4
Total	0	3	1	4

== National age group records ==
=== Long course meters (50 m pool) ===
No.	Event	Time		Meet	Location	Date	Age	Age Group	Ref
1	100 m breaststroke	1:05.71	sf	2020 USA Olympic Trials	Omaha, Nebraska	June 14, 2021	17 years, 106 days	17–18	
2	100 m breaststroke (2)	1:05.28		2020 USA Olympic Trials	Omaha, Nebraska	June 15, 2021	17 years, 107 days	17–18	
3	100 m breaststroke (3)	1:04.95		2020 Summer Olympics	Tokyo, Japan	July 27, 2021	17 years, 149 days	17–18	

Legend: sf – semifinal

=== Short course yards (25 yd pool) ===
No.	Event	Time	Meet	Location	Date	Age	Age Group	Ref
1	100 yd breaststroke	57.54	2022 Minnesota Invitational	Minneapolis, Minnesota	December 2, 2022	18 years, 277 days	17–18	
2	100 yd breaststroke (2)	57.45	2023 Texas vs. NC State Dual Meet	Austin, Texas	January 27, 2023	18 years, 333 days	17–18	
3	100 yd breaststroke (3)	57.29	2023 Big 12 Conference Championships	Austin, Texas	February 24, 2023	18 years, 361 days	17–18	
4	200 yd breaststroke	2:04.32	2023 Big 12 Conference Championships	Austin, Texas	February 25, 2023	18 years, 362 days	17–18	

== Awards and honors ==
- Jacoby was the sole female recipient in Alaska in 2018 of the "Outstanding Competitor" award in swimming and diving from the Alaska School Activities Association and First National Bank Alaska. The award is presented annually to two selected athletes, one female and one male, who compete at the Alaska State Swim and Dive Championship. She received the award again in 2021.
- On May 4, 2021, the Alaska Sports Hall of Fame board of directors selected Jacoby as the recipient of the girls "Pride of Alaska Award" for 2021. She was the first swimmer to receive the award.
- On June 26, 2021, and July 29, 2021, U.S. Senator Dan Sullivan of Alaska honored Jacoby on the floor of the United States Senate as the "Alaskan of the Week" for her accomplishments in swimming leading up to and during the 2020 Summer Olympics.
- For the month of July 2021, Jacoby won the SwimSwam honor of "Ultra Swim Swimmer of the Month" for her individual gold medal in the 100-meter breaststroke at the 2020 Olympic Games.
- In September 2021, Jacoby was one of 38 athletes to receive the honor of being a finalist for the 91st James E. Sullivan Award, which was designed to recognize the accomplishments of select athletes who competed representing the United States, be it at the club, college, or international level, during the 2021 year.
- In October 2021, Jacoby received the honor of being nominated for three 2021 Golden Goggle Awards including "Female Race of the Year" for her gold medal-winning 100-meter breaststroke at the 2020 Summer Olympics, "Female Athlete of the Year", and "Breakout Performer of the Year". In December 2021 she received two of the three awards she was nominated for: "Female Race of the Year" and "Breakout Performer of the Year".
- For the week of November 1, 2021, Jacoby and her fellow United States team members for the 2021 World Short Course Championships being announced was number two for "The Week That Was" honor from Swimming World.
- In December 2021, Jacoby received the Swammy Award for the "World Junior Female Swimmer of the Year" from SwimSwam for her performances at the 2020 Summer Olympics. She also received the Swimming World honor for "Female Newcomer of the Year" for her Olympic Games, Swimming World Cup, and World Short Course Championships performances.
- On January 5, 2022, Jacoby was announced as the recipient of the 2021 Swammy Award for "Female Breakout Swimmer of the Year".
- For the 2022 year, SwimSwam ranked Jacoby as the number 15 female swimmer in the world across all strokes.
- For her first year (2022–2023 season) of competition in NCAA Division I swimming for the Texas Longhorns, Jacoby received the Women's Newcomer of the Week award from the Big 12 Conference for the weeks of October 26, 2022, and January 18, 2023, as part of their weekly swimming and diving awards.
- In March 2023, Jacoby was named Newcomer of the Year in women's swimming for the 2022–2023 NCAA season by the Big 12 Conference.

== See also ==
- Chronological summary of the 2020 Summer Olympics
- List of Olympic medalists in swimming (women)
- List of athletes from Alaska
- List of people from Anchorage
- List of people from Alaska
- Jacoby (surname)
