= Swimming at the 2012 Summer Olympics – Women's 100 metre breaststroke =

Women's 100 metre breaststroke at the Games of the XXX Olympiad
- Venue: London Aquatics Centre
- Date: July 29, 2012 (heats & semifinals); July 30, 2012 (final)
- Competitors: 46 from 36 nations
- Winning time: 1:05.47

Medalists
1st place, gold medalist(s)		Rūta Meilutytė	Lithuania
2nd place, silver medalist(s)		Rebecca Soni	United States
3rd place, bronze medalist(s)		Satomi Suzuki	Japan

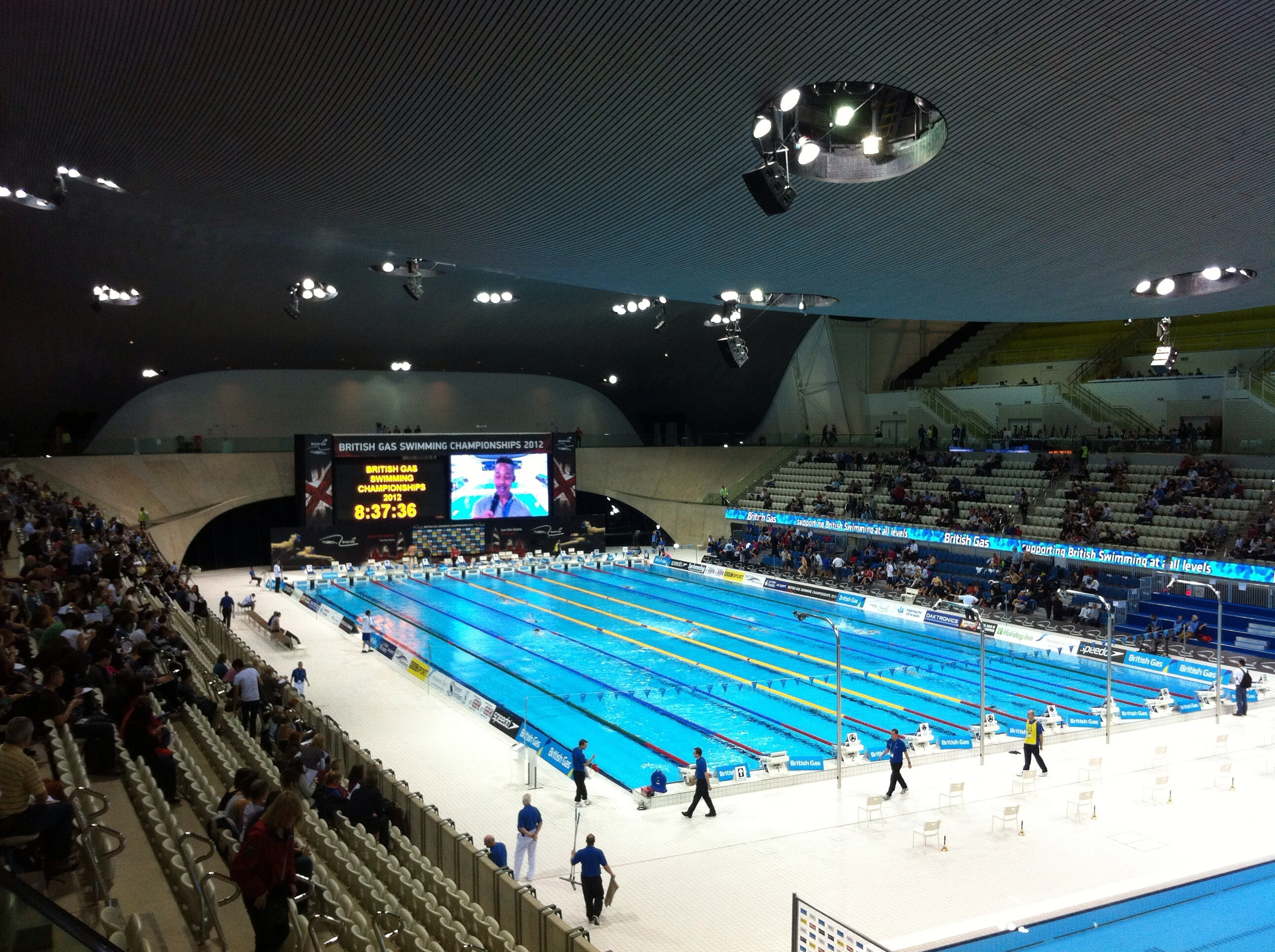
London 2012 Aquatics Centre March

The women's 100 metre breaststroke event at the 2012 Summer Olympics took place on 29–30 July at the London Aquatics Centre in London, United Kingdom.

At 15 years of age, Rūta Meilutytė won the gold medal for Lithuania in a time of 1:05.47. to become Lithuania's first gold medalist in swimming under its own banner. Dominating the race from the start, she pulled away from the field to an unexpected triumph in a sterling time of 1:05.47. U.S. top favorite and reigning world champion Rebecca Soni held on a sprint challenge from the Lithuanian teen at the halfway turn, but ended up defending her silver instead from Beijing four years earlier in 1:05.55. Meanwhile, Satomi Suzuki powered home with the bronze in 1:06.46, handing Japan its first medal in the event's history.

Jamaica's Alia Atkinson raced on the outside lane after her swim-off triumph over Canada's Tera van Beilen in the semifinals, but narrowly missed the podium with a fourth-place time in 1:06.93. Competing in her fourth Olympics as Australia's first swimmer, defending Olympic champion Leisel Jones finished fifth in a time of 1:06.96 to end her career with a full set of medals.

U.S. swimmer Breeja Larson escaped from a "no false-start" rule to pull off a sixth-place finish in 1:06.96, as the issue of her pre-race jump came with a faulty starting system. Russia's Yuliya Yefimova (1:06.98) and Denmark's Rikke Pedersen (1:07.55) rounded out the field.

== Records ==
Prior to this competition, the existing world and Olympic records were as follows.

World record	Jessica Hardy (USA)	1:04.45	Federal Way, United States	7 August 2009
Olympic record	Leisel Jones (AUS)	1:05.17	Beijing, China	10 August 2008

== Results ==
=== Heats ===
Rank	Heat	Lane	Name	Nationality	Time	Notes
1	4	6	Rūta Meilutytė	Lithuania	1:05.56	Q, NR
2	6	4	Rebecca Soni	United States	1:05.75	Q
3	6	5	Yuliya Yefimova	Russia	1:06.51	Q
4	5	4	Breeja Larson	United States	1:06.58	Q
5	4	4	Leisel Jones	Australia	1:06.98	Q
6	5	5	Satomi Suzuki	Japan	1:07.08	Q
7	6	2	Sarah Poewe	Germany	1:07.12	Q
8	6	3	Jennie Johansson	Sweden	1:07.14	Q
9	5	3	Rikke Pedersen	Denmark	1:07.23	Q
10	3	6	Alia Atkinson	Jamaica	1:07.39	Q, NR
11	4	5	Leiston Pickett	Australia	1:07.41	Q
12	3	2	Suzaan van Biljon	South Africa	1:07.54	Q
13	4	1	Zhao Jin	China	1:07.68	Q
14	4	2	Mina Matsushima	Japan	1:07.69	Q
15	4	3	Jillian Tyler	Canada	1:07.81	Q
16	5	2	Tera van Beilen	Canada	1:07.85	Q
17	5	7	Liu Xiaoyu	China	1:07.99	
18	3	3	Sara El Bekri	Morocco	1:08.21	NR
19	5	1	Joline Höstman	Sweden	1:08.28	
20	6	7	Moniek Nijhuis	Netherlands	1:08.31	
21	6	8	Siobhan-Marie O'Connor	Great Britain	1:08.32	
22	5	6	Caroline Ruhnau	Germany	1:08.43	
23	6	6	Daria Deeva	Russia	1:08.44	
24	3	5	Petra Chocová	Czech Republic	1:08.59	
25	4	7	Marina Garcia Urzainqui	Spain	1:08.64	
26	4	8	Sycerika McMahon	Ireland	1:08.80	
27	3	4	Michela Guzzetti	Italy	1:08.83	
28	5	8	Kate Haywood	Great Britain	1:09.22	
29	3	1	Dilara Buse Günaydin	Turkey	1:09.43	
30	2	4	Tjaša Vozel	Slovenia	1:09.63	
31	2	5	Anna Sztankovics	Hungary	1:09.65	
32	2	6	Fanny Babou	France	1:09.76	
33	3	7	Kim Hye-jin	South Korea	1:09.79	
34	2	3	Jenna Laukkanen	Finland	1:09.92	
35	2	2	Ana Rodrigues	Portugal	1:10.62	
36	2	1	Danielle Beaubrun	Saint Lucia	1:11.12	
37	3	8	Mariya Liver	Ukraine	1:11.23	
38	2	7	Chen I-chuan	Chinese Taipei	1:11.28	
39	6	1	Concepcion Badillo Diaz	Spain	1:12.58	
40	2	8	Tatiana Chisca	Moldova	1:13.30	
41	1	4	Ivana Ninković	Bosnia and Herzegovina	1:14.04	
42	1	3	Pilar Shimizu	Guam	1:15.76	NR
43	1	5	Matelita Buadromo	Fiji	1:16.33	
44	1	6	Oksana Hatamkhanova	Azerbaijan	1:25.52	
45	1	2	Oyungerel Gantumur	Mongolia	1:27.17	
46	1	7	Dede Camara	Guinea	1:38.54	

=== Semifinals ===
==== Semifinal 1 ====
Rank	Lane	Name	Nationality	Time	Notes
1	4	Rebecca Soni	United States	1:05.98	Q
2	5	Breeja Larson	United States	1:06.70	Q
3	3	Satomi Suzuki	Japan	1:07.10	Q
4	2	Alia Atkinson	Jamaica	1:07.48	QSO
4	8	Tera van Beilen	Canada	1:07.48	QSO
6	6	Jennie Johansson	Sweden	1:07.57	
7	7	Suzaan van Biljon	South Africa	1:07.68	
8	1	Mina Matsushima	Japan	1:08.26	

==== Semifinal 2 ====
Rank	Lane	Name	Nationality	Time	Notes
1	4	Rūta Meilutytė	Lithuania	1:05.21	Q, EU, NR
2	5	Yuliya Yefimova	Russia	1:06.57	Q
3	3	Leisel Jones	Australia	1:06.81	Q
4	2	Rikke Pedersen	Denmark	1:06.82	Q
5	6	Sarah Poewe	Germany	1:07.68	
6	7	Leiston Pickett	Australia	1:07.74	
7	8	Jillian Tyler	Canada	1:07.87	
8	1	Zhao Jin	China	1:07.97	

==== Semifinal swim-off ====
Rank	Lane	Name	Nationality	Time	Notes
1	5	Alia Atkinson	Jamaica	1:06.79	Q, NR
2	4	Tera van Beilen	Canada	1:07.73	

=== Final ===
Rank	Lane	Name	Nationality	Time	Notes
1st place, gold medalist(s)	4	Rūta Meilutytė	Lithuania	1:05.47	
2nd place, silver medalist(s)	5	Rebecca Soni	United States	1:05.55	
3rd place, bronze medalist(s)	1	Satomi Suzuki	Japan	1:06.46	
4	8	Alia Atkinson	Jamaica	1:06.93	
5	2	Leisel Jones	Australia	1:06.95	
6	6	Breeja Larson	United States	1:06.96	*
7	3	Yuliya Yefimova	Russia	1:06.98	
8	7	Rikke Pedersen	Denmark	1:07.55	

* False start, but she was not disqualified due to technical error.
