= Kickbusch =

Kickbusch is a surname. Notable people with the surname include:

- Amy Kickbusch (born 1986), Australian field hockey player
- F. W. Kickbusch (1841–1907), American lumberman, firefighter and politician
- Ilona Kickbusch (born 1948), German political scientist

== See also ==
- Joan Arend Kickbush (1926–2006), American artist
