= Mr. Whitekeys =

American musician (1947–2026)

Douglas Haggar (February 25, 1947 – October 19, 2026), better known as Mr. Whitekeys and also as W. Keys, was an American musician, recording artist, businessman, writer, media personality and ornithologist in Alaska. He was the owner and operator of a nightclub called the Fly By Night Club, located in the Spenard neighborhood of Anchorage, from 1980 to 2006. In part due to his flamboyant public persona and penchant for humor (and to a more limited extent, penchant for self-promotion), he figured prominently in the modern history and folklore of Spenard. He released sporadic recordings starting in 1972, mostly under the band name The Fabulous Spamtones.

== Life and career ==
=== Early life ===
Douglas Haggar was born in Ohio on February 25, 1947. He spent his early years living in South Dakota, Iowa, and Arizona. Whitekeys graduated Duke University and came to Alaska in 1970 with a friend. He began working as a bar band musician, particularly for Mike Gordon at his new Spenard establishment Chilkoot Charlie's. He coined what became Chilkoot Charlie's slogan, "We cheat the other guy and pass the savings on to you." Gordon's success with this bar led to a short-lived attempt on his part to expand into Girdwood and Fairbanks during the mid-1970s. Whitekeys originally came to Fairbanks as part of this expansion where he played in "Two Street" bars during the construction of the Trans-Alaska Pipeline System and the economic boom which accompanied it.

=== Nightclub ownership and Whale Fat Follies ===
After playing throughout Alaska, and later a short-lived stint in the Ballard neighborhood of Seattle, he started his own nightclub, the Fly By Night Club, which opened for business on July 31, 1980. The Fly By Night Club, along with the Flying Machine, were the last occupants in a historic building on the eastern shore of Lake Spenard, originally the home of the Idle Hour Supper Club and not far from the site of Joe Spenard's original resort. The building was demolished in 1984 to make way for a large hotel, currently the Lakefront Hotel.

Whitekeys moved the club further up Spenard Road, one block north of Spenard's post office. Both locations of the club were described in advertisements featuring an extensive list of past building occupants, with the motto "Going out of business regularly in the same location for over 30 years." Described by Whitekeys as an effort to be different, the primary attractions of the club were a food menu heavily based on Spam dishes and shows such as Springtime In Spenard, The Whale Fat Follies, The Freeze-Up Follies and Christmas In Spenard.

The Whale Fat Follies was performed from June to September and was largely geared towards tourists, being advertised as "the Alaskan show The Department Of Tourism does NOT want you to see." The off-season shows tended to be more topical, catering to locals. The club operated until September 9, 2006. Whitekeys sold the establishment to Allen Choy, the owner of a popular South Anchorage nightclub, and his partner Jeff Matosky. They reopened the club as Players House of Rock.

Following the sale of the Fly By Night Club, Whitekeys performed at private events and professional conferences. Between 2011 and 2019 he resumed the Whale of Fat Follies first at a bar called Taproot and later at the Hard Rock Cafe.

=== Later career ===
Whitekeys contributed commentaries to The Alaska Almanac: Facts About Alaska, Alaska magazine and the newscasts of Anchorage television station KTUU. He was also the president of the Anchorage Audubon Society. In 2024, Whitekeys published The Voyage of The Alaska Union, about a 19th century Alaskan gold rush expedition.

=== Death ===
Whitekeys died on October 19, 2026, at the age of 79.

== Discography ==
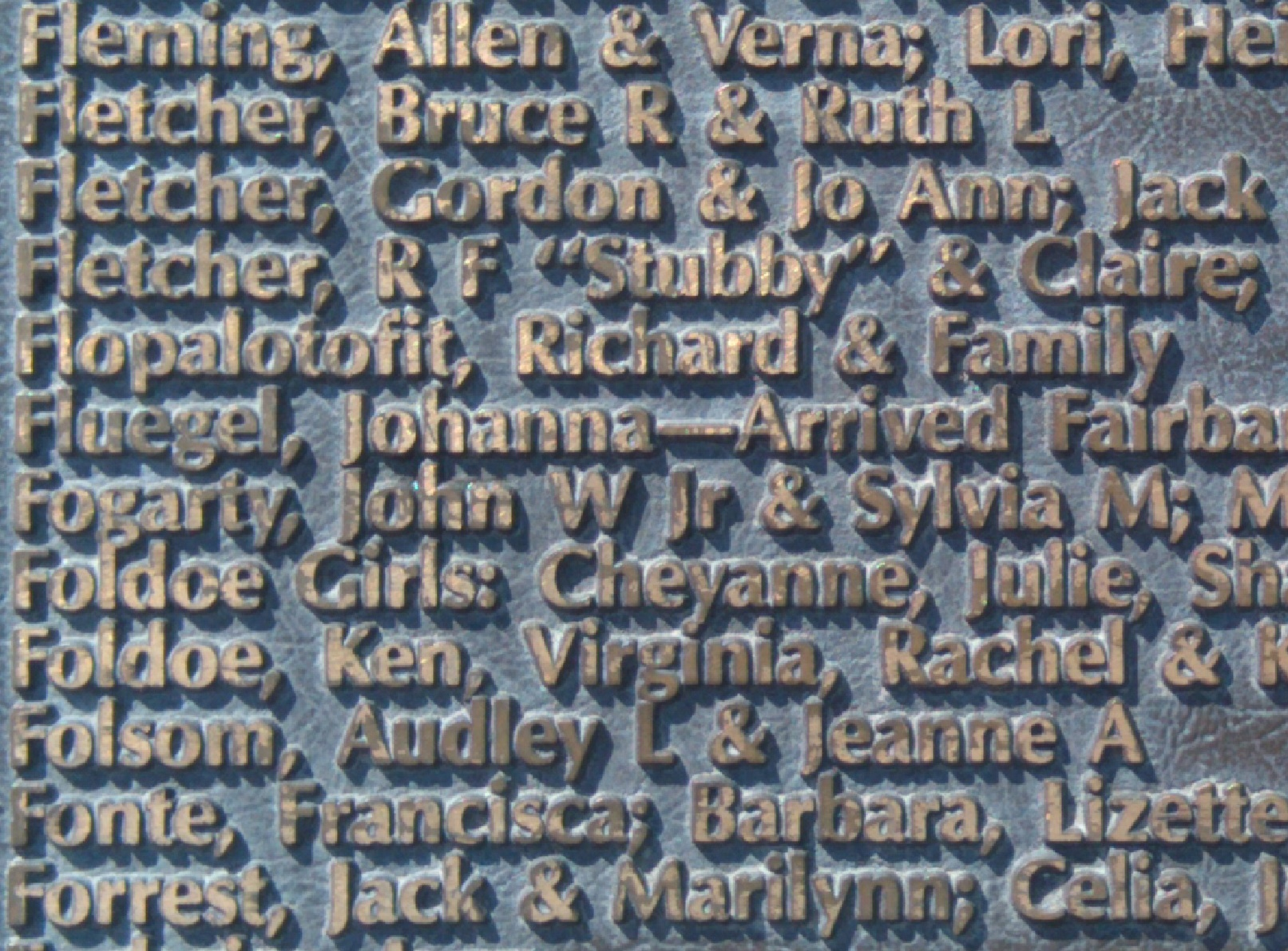
Plaque in Golden Heart Plaza in downtown Fairbanks, containing names of Fairbanks residents. In his book Mr. Whitekeys' Alaska Bizarre: Direct from the Whale Fat Follies Revue, Whitekeys points out that a man named "Dick Flopalotofit" is listed next to a man named "Stubby" on the plaque.

- (as Mr. Whitekeys & The Fabulous Spamtones)
  - Mr. Whitekeys & The Fabulous Spamtones
  - The Whale Fat Follies!
  - It's Not Easy Bein' Sleazy

Song Tracks
1. Viva Spenard
2. I'm My Own Grandpa
3. My Favorite Things
4. Schedule D
5. The History of Cereal
6. Blame It On El Nino
7. The Wrestling Song
8. Martha Goes Camping
9. Ride On Loren Leman
10. There's No Nuggets Like Moose Nuggets
11. Jewel
12. Here Comes Menopause
13. The Lewinsky Sisters'
14. The Moose Nugget Blues
15. Don't Let Me Go To Costco
16. Fishita
17. Orange Blossom Special

- (as Mr. Whitekeys featuring Kenny Blackwell)
  - The Bluesaholics
- (as Dick & Dubya)
  - "The Liar Sleeps Tonight" single (2004). This song became popular that year on Dr. Demento's show.
- (on various artists compilations)
  - Livin' In Rhythm: Alaska Celebrates "Sourdough" Mike McDonald
  - Dr. Demento's Basement Tapes 9 (2001) contains "Martha Goes Camping"

== Bibliography ==
- Mr. Whitekeys' Alaska Bizarre: Direct from the Whale Fat Follies Revue
- DVD: Alaska: The First 10,000 Years (2008)
