= Rosie Mancari =

American snowboarder (born 1994)

Rosie Mancari (born January 22, 1994) is an American snowboarder. She has been named to the United States Olympic team in snowboardcross for the 2018 Winter Olympics in Pyeongchang.

== Early life and education ==
Rosie Mancari was born and raised in Anchorage, Alaska. Her parents own Denali Sightseeing Safari, a company which provides tours of Denali National Park via truck. She has two sisters and one brother. Rosie began snowboarding competitively at age fourteen. Rosie graduated early from South High to move to Steamboat Springs, Colorado to further her training in slalom and giant slalom racing. She then switched to snowboardcross. She attended the University of Alaska Anchorage.

== Career ==
Mancari began competing on the NorAm snowboardcross circuit in 2014. After two years, she moved up to the World Cup level. At her first World Cup competition in Montafon, Austria, she placed 31st. In 2017, she placed 18th at the snowboardcross world championships. In December 2017, she placed 14th at a snowboardcross competition in Cervina, Italy. In January, she placed 25th at a competition in Erzurum, Turkey. After failing to clinch an Olympic spot on the United States Olympic team, she was named to the team snowboardcross for the 2018 Winter Olympics in Pyeongchang as a discretionary pick.
