= Robert Bundtzen =

American dog musher

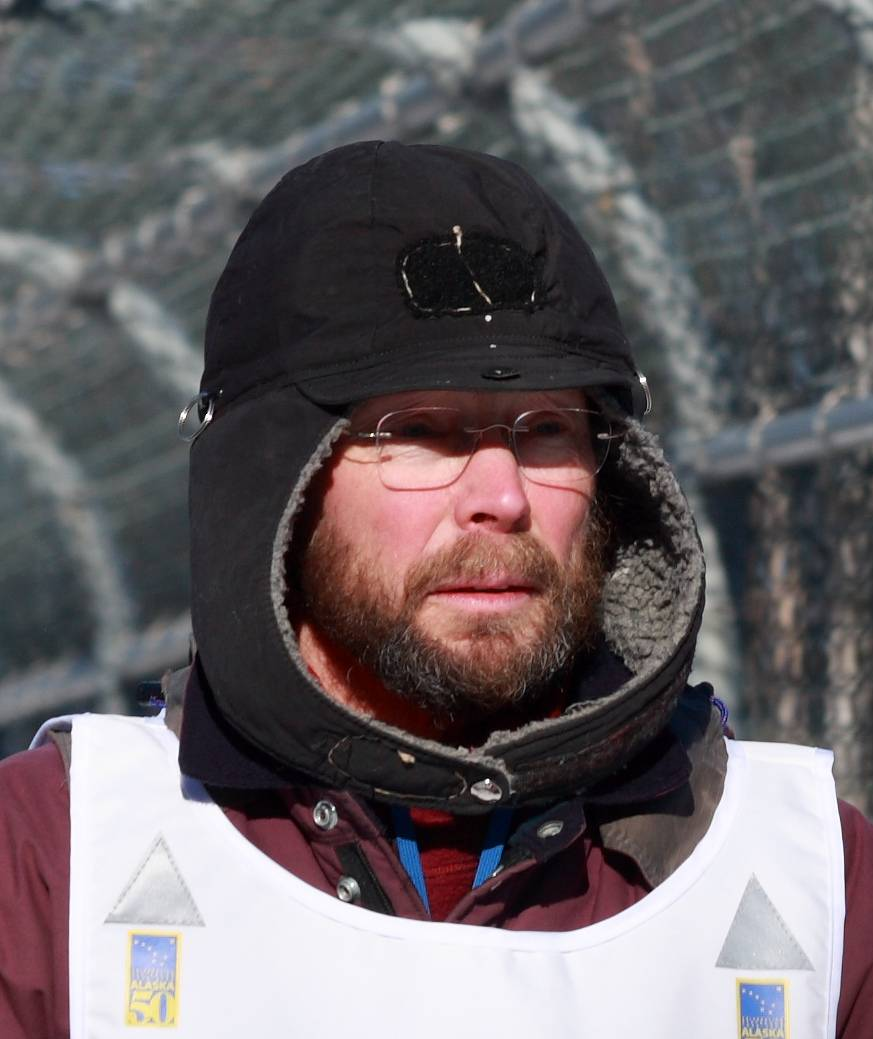
- Bundzen in 2009
- Born: Robert Bundtzen; 1949 (age 76–77); North Dakota, U.S.
- Education: University of Alaska; University of Washington; University of Wisconsin
- Occupations: Physician, dog musher
- Spouse: Dr. Joan Bundzten
- Children: 1

Robert Bundtzen (born 1949) is an American physician and dog musher based in Anchorage, Alaska.

== Early life ==
Bundzten was born in North Dakota in 1949. As a child he lived in New Mexico before his family relocated to Alaska in 1960. The family first lived in Fairbanks, Alaska and later moved to Anderson. There, the family of six lived in a mobile home while his father, an electrical engineer, worked to help to create the Ballistic Missile Early Warning System in Clear. The town of Anderson was small; Bundtzen's school had only one room and the class had twelve pupils, three of whom were his siblings. His mother was diagnosed with breast cancer during this time and after she died the family moved back to Fairbanks. Where he enrolled at the University of Alaska. He later attended the University of Washington School of Medicine, earning his Doctor of Medicine in 1975, and subsequently completed his fellowship and residency, focusing on infectious diseases, at the University of Wisconsin in 1978.

== Career as a dog musher ==
Though Bundzten first experimented with mushing in the '60s as a teenager growing up in Alaska, he did not take the sport seriously until the '90s. His competed in the Iditarod Trail Sled Dog Race for the first time in 1995, taking 13 days, 9 hours, 55 minutes, and 9 seconds to complete the course and coming in 40th place. To date, his best time is 10 days, 15 hours, 25 minutes, and 15 seconds, a time he achieved in 2006, and his highest position was achieved in 1997, when he placed 27th. According to the Iditarod's official website, he has won a combined total of $14,607.88 in prize money.

=== Race history ===
Year	Position	Time (h:min:s)
1995	40th	13 days, 09:55:09
1997	27th	12 days, 01:32:43
1999	28th	12 days, 15:04:15
2001	31st	12 days, 15:38:43
2002	31st	11 days, 00:34:42
2003	28th	11 days, 15:18:54
2004	38th	11 days, 06:53:00
2005	39th	11 days, 18:45:30
2006	30th	10 days, 15:25:15
2007	43rd	12 days, 14:21:17
2008	35th	11 days, 05:58:45
2009	34th	12 days, 13:24:30
2014	42nd	11 days, 20:23:18
2016	54th	11 days, 08:10:25

== Personal life ==
Bundtzen is married to Joan Bundzten (b. c. 1948), a chemical pathologist. They have a son and two grandsons. Both he and his wife practice medicine in Anchorage. He has three siblings.
