= Emir Muratović =

Bosnian swimmer

Personal information
- Born: 6 November 1996 (age 28); Tuzla, Bosnia and Herzegovina

Sport
- Sport: Swimming

Emir Muratović (born 6 November 1996) is a Bosnian swimmer. He competed in the men's 50 metre freestyle and the men's 100 metre freestyle at the 2020 Summer Olympics.
