= Joan Arend Kickbush =

American artist (1926–2006)

- Born: Joan Arend; March 23, 1926; Milwaukee, Wisconsin, US
- Died: June 16, 2006 (aged 80); Delafield, Wisconsin, US
- Education: Layton School of Art, University of Wisconsin–Milwaukee
- Known for: Painting, sculptor, illustrator, writer
- Spouse: Roland Gene Kickbush

Joan Arend Kickbush (March 23, 1926 – June 16, 2006) was an American artist. Her paintings and illustrations featured Alaska Native children, Yupik villagers and Arctic wildlife. She painted in watercolor and oil.

== Personal life ==
Joan developed an interest in drawing as a small girl. Joan Arend married Roland Gene Kickbush, who was nicknamed "Kick". In 1953 Kickbush and her husband Roland moved to Anchorage, Alaska where they both worked as a teachers and Kickbush painted. They built their first home in 1960 in Anchorage.

By 1978 Kickbush and her husband left Alaska to live in the Lower 48 states. They lived in Bend, Oregon; California and Carefree, Arizona. (Note: Her husband's obituary says that the couple left Alaska in 1978, but they were living in Bend, Oregon by 1977.)

She died on June 16, 2006. Roland died in California on June 25, 2009. In 1965 it was reported that the couple had no children, and there were no children mentioned in Roland's obituary.

== Career ==
Before moving to Anchorage in 1953, she was a commercial artist in Minnesota, Wisconsin and Hawaii. Once she settled in Anchorage, however, there was little opportunity for a commercial artist. She was a kindergarten teacher when she took an Alaskan teacher's tour to Kotzebue and Nome in 1955. From that time, she embarked on what became a career painting Alaska Native (Inupiat–Yupik) children. Her paintings of the "wide-eyed" children were popular, and journalist Phyllis Eilleen Lancaster stated that: "Her style is realistic, with the charm and appeal of Hummel figurines."

At an exhibit in 1963 at the Alaska Art Gallery, 40 of her watercolors and oils of native children were shown. It was her first Interior Alaska art showing. Shed exhibited her work at the House of Wood, a local gallery in Fairbanks.

The couple purchased a plane that Roland piloted so that they could travel to remote villages in Alaska. She made paintings in her studio of scenes she had sketched during their visits, and he matted and framed her works. The Siberian Yupik village of Savoonga on St. Lawrence Island was her favorite subject. At a United Nations tea in Anchorage in or before 1965, Hubert Humphrey's wife, Muriel Buck Humphrey, was given one of Kickbush's works. The Alaska Crippled Children's Association gave a painting to the head chaplain and it hung in his Washington D.C. office. The University of Wisconsin had her works in a permanent collection.

An exhibition of her watercolor and oils was held at the Alaska Art Gallery in Fairbanks from November 18 to December 2, 1966.

The Frye Art Museum in Seattle held an exhibition of Kickbush's works in November, 1977. It featured her paintings of Alaska Native children. At that time she and her husband were living in Bend, Oregon, and she made paintings from sketches she had previously made during visits to Alaskan villages. Her trademark technique was to "transfer the sketches to pressed board and after applying oils, uses a palette knife technique to produce a jewel-like finish;" Her oils obtained a matte finish through the use of artists' wax. (Note: In 1968, she demonstrated her technique for painting with a knife with oils on Masonite while painting a child with his dog when she was a guest of the Fort Wainwright Officers Wives Club. A photograph of her at work was printed in the Fairbanks Daily News-Miner.) During her career as a commercial artist she cleaned many brushes, so when she began working on her own she preferred the palette knife and only used a brush to sign a painting.

Kickbush wrote and illustrated several coloring books that were popular with Alaska Natives because the images were so lifelike. She illustrated a textbook, This is Alaska, and created a line of stationery and Christmas cards. Kickbush worked in pastels, ink, charcoal and watercolors.

== Works ==
=== Paintings ===
Her works have been held in collections from Alaska to Washington, D.C. and in Europe and Japan. Just a few of her works are:

- I do not understand, not dated, oil on Masonite with wax, Frye Art Museum
- Winter Fun, 1972, owned by the Monroe Foundation and donated for a fund-raising auction in 2013 (Note: Monroe Foundation owned the painting Winter Fun and donated it for the 2013 "Happiness in Paying Our Way" (HIPOW) Auction in Fairbanks to raise funds for schools. The painting was valued at $1,200.)

=== Writer and illustrator ===
Kickbush also wrote and illustrated several children's books:

- Life in an Eskimo Village: A cut-out and color book, Anchorage: Color Art Print Company, 1959
- Esko the Eskimo, Menomonie, Wisconsin: University of Wisconsin-Stout, 2001, originally published in 1974
- Granny Moose and Her Red Caboose, Menomonie, Wisconsin: University of Wisconsin-Stout, 2003

=== Illustrator ===
- Cry of the Wilderness. Author: Mrs. Lowell Thomas Jr. Illustrator: Joan Kickbush.
- Our Alaska. Author: Leah Peterson. Artist: Joan Arend Kickbush. 195?
- This is Alaska. Editor: Alice H. Hayden. Consultants: Madge Gradon and Helen Finlay. Artist: Joan Arend Kickbush. Seattle, Washington: Cascade Pacific Books, 1958.
