= Jovan Lekić =

Bosnian swimmer (2003)

Personal information
- National team: Bosnia and Herzegovina
- Born: 29 September 2003 (age 23)
- Height: 6’1”

Sport
- Sport: Swimming
- Strokes: Men's 400m freestyle
- College team: Louisiana State University

Jovan Lekić (born 29 September 2003) is a Bosnian swimmer. Lekić competed for Bosnia and Herzegovina at the 2024 Summer Olympics in the men's 400m freestyle event. After finishing sixth in his heat, he did not advance to the final. At the 2024 Short Course World Championships, he set a Bosnian national record in the 200m freestyle. He swims collegiately for Louisiana State University.
