= Spenard, Anchorage =

Neighborhood of Anchorage, Alaska, United States of America

Coordinates: 61°11′19″N 149°54′23″W

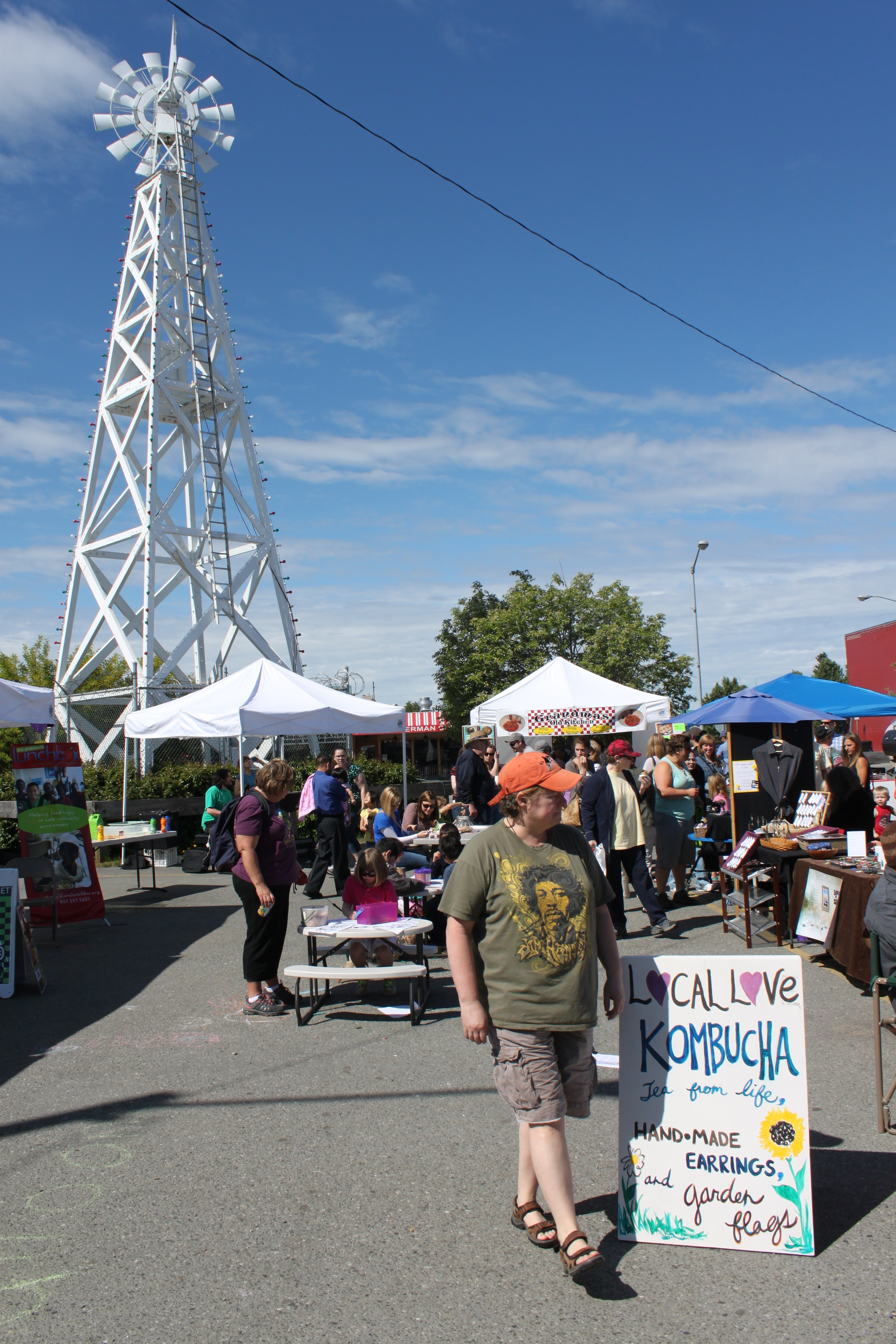
The Spenard Farmers' Market and Spenard windmill are located in the parking lot serving Chilkoot Charlie's in the northern end of Spenard.

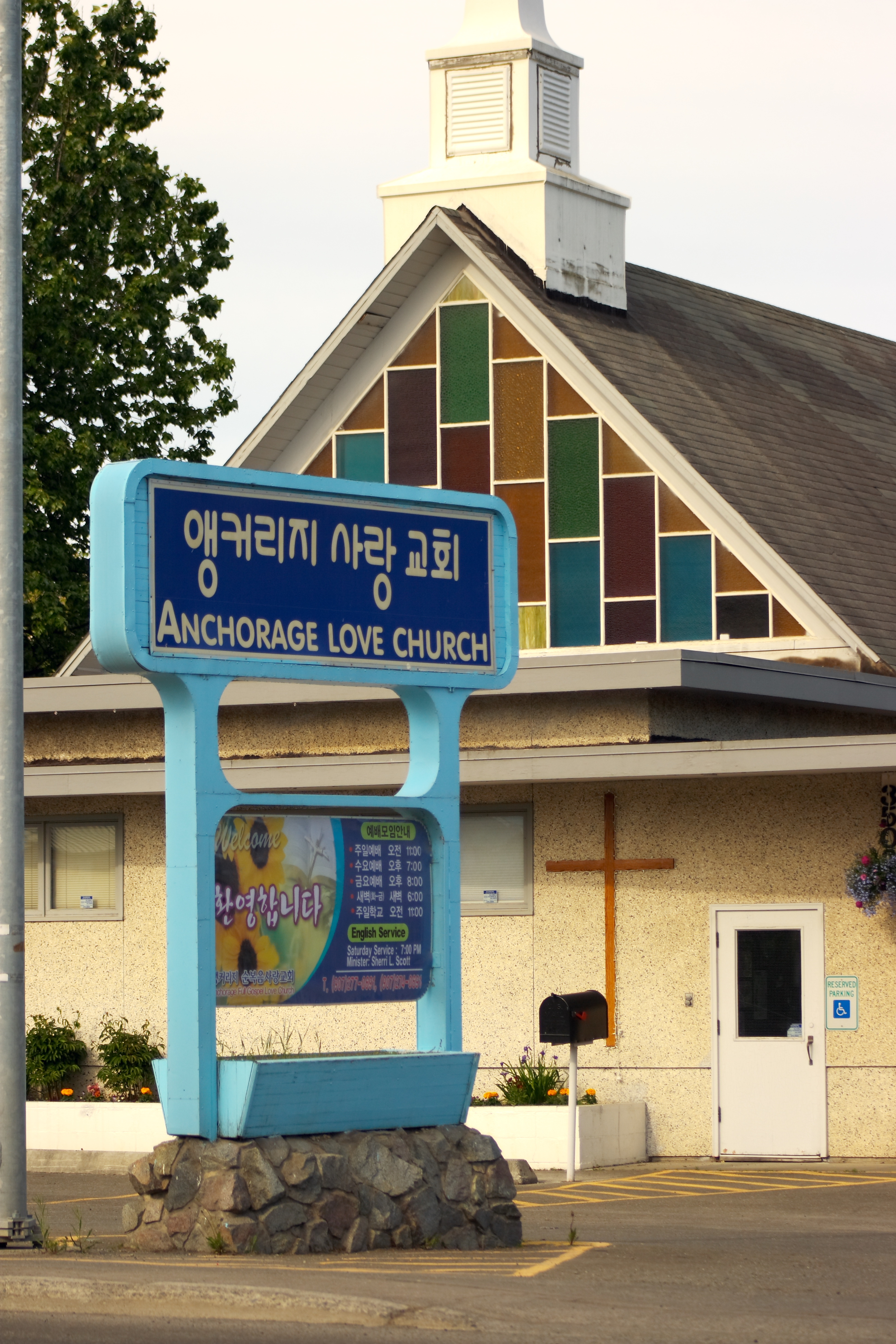
The former Anchorage Love Church, now a meeting space operated by the nonprofit Cook Inlet Housing Authority, is located in a section of Spenard with a heavy concentration of Korean-owned businesses and other establishments.

Spenard is a neighborhood in the Municipality of Anchorage, Alaska, United States and was historically a separate city from Anchorage. The road that bears its name, Spenard Road, begins at Ted Stevens Anchorage International Airport at its southern end, and continues north toward downtown before ending at Westchester Lagoon, where it turns and becomes part of I Street.

== History ==
Before unification of the City of Anchorage and the Greater Anchorage Area Borough in 1975, Spenard was an unincorporated suburban community of Anchorage. It is arguably older than Anchorage itself, although records are not clear. Anchorage was founded on Ship Creek during construction of the Alaska Railroad. Spenard began as a lumber camp. The road from the lumber camp to the tent city on Ship Creek was subsequently named "Spenard Road" for Joe Spenard, an owner of the lumber camp. Joe Spenard built a dance hall/resort on the shores of Spenard Lake, which burned down after a brief period of great success.

Historical population
Year	Pop.
1950	2,108
1960	9,074
1970	18,089

For years, Spenard contained one of many "red light districts" in the region (other red light districts were found in downtown Anchorage on Fourth Avenue, in Fairview, and in the nearby neighborhood of Mountain View). During construction of the Trans-Alaska Pipeline System, the City of Anchorage successfully cleaned up Fourth Avenue by literally bulldozing dozens of buildings. However, the proximity of Spenard to Anchorage International Airport resulted in unprecedented growth of bars, nightclubs, prostitution outlets, gambling clubs, and other disreputable businesses, which catered to pipeline workers laden with money after long stints in isolated construction camps. Today, Spenard still features a large number of bars and a somewhat higher rate of drunken crime than the rest of Anchorage, despite extensive efforts during the post-Pipeline era to "clean up" the community.

== Transportation ==
There is much redevelopment (in the form of mixed-use, transit-oriented development) planned for the Spenard Road corridor, especially in the vicinity of 36th Avenue & Spenard Road. In order to support this development, the neighborhood was placed on the People Mover's "frequent network", with the #40 bus operating every 15 minutes down Spenard Road on weekdays (weekend service operates every 30 minutes). There is also the #65 (once per hour), which takes neighborhood residents to/from the Dimond Center Mall via Jewel Lake Road.

== See also ==
- History of Anchorage, Alaska
- Mr. Whitekeys
