= Caroline Ruhnau =

German swimmer

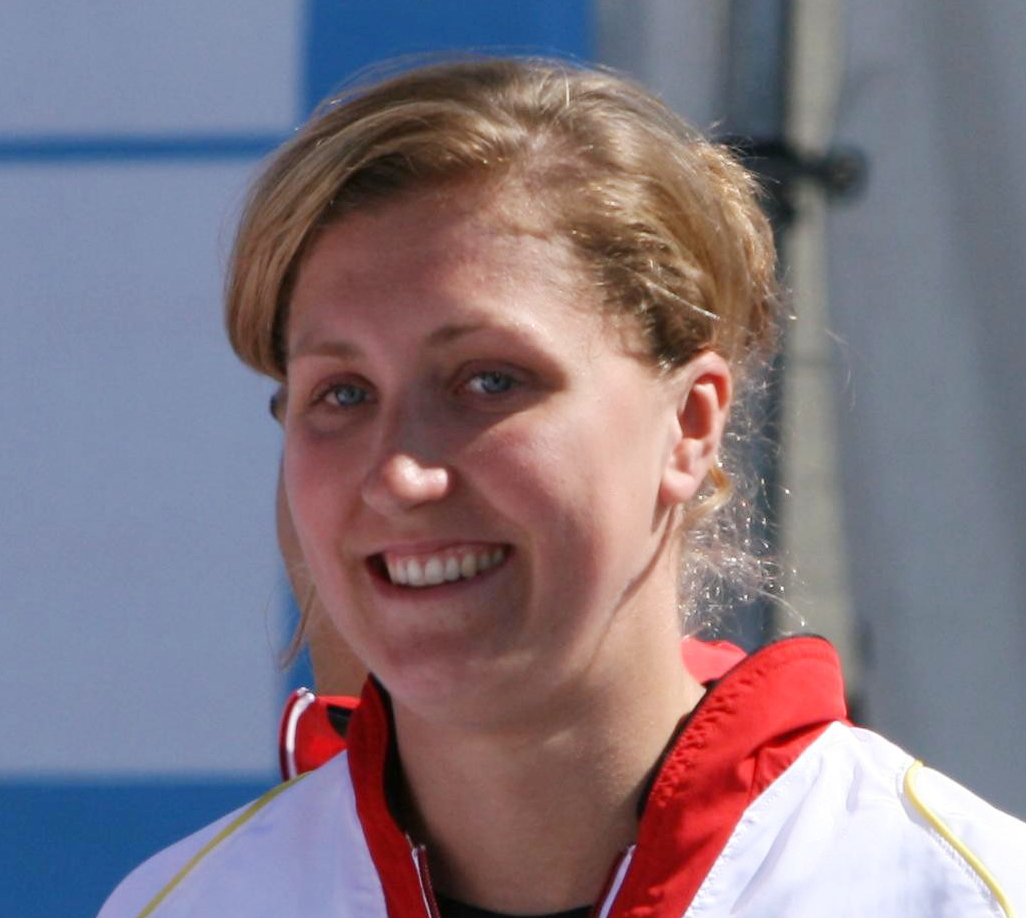
- Ruhnau in 2012

Personal information
- Born: 16 October 1984 (age 41) Münster, West Germany
- Height: 1.75 m (5 ft 9 in)
- Weight: 62 kg (137 lb)

Sport
- Sport: Swimming
- Club: SG Essen
Medal record
European Championships (LC)
Bronze medal – third place	2010 Budapest	4×100 m medley
Bronze medal – third place	2012 Debrecen	50 m breaststroke
European Championships (SC)
Gold medal – first place	2009 Istanbul	100 m breaststroke
Silver medal – second place	2013 Herning	4x50 m mixed medley

Caroline Ruhnau (born 16 October 1984) is a German swimmer. She competed at the 2012 Summer Olympics in the 100 m breaststroke, but failed to reach the final. She won this event at the European Short Course Swimming Championships 2009. She also won two bronze medals at European long-course championships in 2010 and 2012.

Her younger sister Alice is also a breaststroke swimmer. She swam on the next lane to Caroline at the Olympic trials in 2012.
