= Concepción Badillo =

Spanish swimmer

Personal information
- Full name: Concepción Badillo Díaz
- Nickname: Conchi
- National team: Spain
- Born: 13 July 1986 (age 39) Jerez de la Frontera, Spain
- Height: 1.70 m (5 ft 7 in)
- Weight: 62 kg (137 lb)

Sport
- Sport: Swimming
- Strokes: Breaststroke
Medal record
Representing Spain
Mediterranean Games
Silver medal – second place	2009 Pescara	50m breaststroke
Silver medal – second place	2009 Pescara	4x100m medley relay

Concepción Badillo Díaz (Note: In this Spanish name, the first or paternal surname is Badillo and the second or maternal family name is Díaz.) (born 13 July 1986) is a Spanish swimmer. She was born in Jerez de la Frontera. At the 2012 Summer Olympics she finished 39th overall in the heats in the Women's 100 metre breaststroke and failed to reach the semifinals.
