= Joe Spenard =

Joseph A. Spenard (1879–1934) was an early settler of Anchorage, Alaska. Lake Spenard, Spenard Road, and the community of Spenard, Alaska (now incorporated into the Municipality of Anchorage) bear his name.

== Biography ==
Joseph A. Spenard was born in Ottawa, Ontario, Canada in 1879. He came to Alaska about 1910, working for the Alaska Securities Company in Valdez before striking out on his own as a pushcart vendor.

In 1916, Spenard came to Anchorage, which had only been named the previous year. He is credited with bringing the first automobile to Anchorage, a truck manufactured by the REO Motor Car Company. He also owned a 1915 Ford Model T which served as the city's first taxicab.

Spenard started a hauling business called the City Express. Flamboyantly decked out in a yellow suit and a top hat, he promoted his services with the slogan, "Time and Tide will Not Wait, But City Express Is Never Late." A newspaper ad for the service contained the following poem:

Four bits is my middle name,
Truck and passengers just the same
No matter from whence you came,

City Express is in the game.

He built a logging road from the Anchorage city boundary at Ninth Avenue and L Street, across Chester and Fish Creek, to what was then called "Jeter Lake" after homesteader Thomas Jeter. The trail and lake would later come to be known respectively as Spenard Road and Lake Spenard. As the area attracted settlers, it became known as the city of Spenard.

Spenard came under the scrutiny of the National Forest Service for clearing an area on the lake's edge and constructing a dance pavilion in what was then part of the Chugach National Forest. In 1916, he held the first Anchorage Ice Carnival there. In 1917, the pavilion burned down, but the lake continued to be known as a recreational hot spot.

Spenard's health failed and he sold his business and moved to Sacramento, California, where he died in 1934.

== Bibliography ==
- Tower, Elizabeth Anchorage: From its Humble Origins as a Railroad Construction Camp (ISBN 0-945397-72-0) (p. 46-7, "Joe Spenard's Legacy")
