= Mihajlo Čeprkalo =

Bosnia and Herzegovina swimmer

Personal information
- Born: 9 June 1999 (age 27) Banja Luka, Bosnia and Herzegovina

Sport
- Sport: Swimming

Mihajlo Čeprkalo (born 9 June 1999) is a Bosnian swimmer. He competed in the men's 1500 metre freestyle event at the 2016 Summer Olympics.
