= Adi Mešetović =

Bosnia and Herzegovina swimmer

Personal information
- Born: 30 April 1997 (age 29)

Sport
- Sport: Swimming

Adi Mešetović (born 30 April 1997) is a Bosnian swimmer. He competed in the men's 50 metre butterfly event at the 2017 World Aquatics Championships.
