= Ensar Hajder =

Bosnian swimmer

Personal information
- Born: June 27, 1991 (age 35) Tuzla, SFR Yugoslavia

Sport
- Sport: Swimming
- Strokes: Medley

Ensar Hajder (born 27 June 1991 in Tuzla, SFR Yugoslavia) is a Bosnian swimmer. He competed in the 200 m individual medley event at the 2012 Summer Olympics and was eliminated in the preliminaries.
