= Ivana Ninković =

Bosnian swimmer

Personal information
- Full name: Ivana Ninković
- Born: 15 December 1995 (age 30) Trebinje, Bosnia and Herzegovina
- Height: 1.71 m (5 ft 7 in)
- Weight: 60 kg (132 lb)

Sport
- Sport: Swimming
- Strokes: Breaststroke
- Club: Swimming Club ' Olymp ' Banja Luka

Ivana Ninković (Serbian Cyrillic: Ивана Нинковић; born 15 December 1995 in Trebinje, Bosnia and Herzegovina) is a Bosnian swimmer who swims for Swimming Club 'Olymp' Banja Luka and for Bosnia and Herzegovina national swim team. She started swimming at her hometown's local swimming club 'Leotar Trebinje' at an early age.

As of 2013, she is an engineering student at Arizona State University where she competes with the Sun Devils team.

== Competitions ==
=== 2011 ===
Ivana participated at Balkan Junior Swimming Championship where she won 3rd place in the 50m Breaststroke. Her first European Competition was LEN: European Junior Championships.
