= Bosnia and Herzegovina at the 2011 World Aquatics Championships =

Sporting event delegation

Flag of Bosnia and Herzegovina

Bosnia and Herzegovina competed at the 2011 World Aquatics Championships in Shanghai, China between July 16 and 31, 2011.

== Swimming ==
Bosnia and Herzegovina qualified 3 swimmers.

Men

Athlete	Event	Heats		Semifinals		Final	
Athlete	Event	Time	Rank	Time	Rank	Time	Rank
Ensar Hajder	Men's 100m Freestyle	51.52	49	did not advance			
Ensar Hajder	Men's 200m IM	2:11.99	45	did not advance			

Women

Athlete	Event	Heats		Semifinals		Final	
Athlete	Event	Time	Rank	Time	Rank	Time	Rank
Branka Vranjes	Women's 100m Freestyle	1:00.40	53	did not advance			
Branka Vranjes	Women's 200m Freestyle	2:09.64	42	did not advance			
Ivana Ninkovic	Women's 50m Breaststroke	32.86	23	did not advance			
Ivana Ninkovic	Women's 100m Breaststroke	1:14.32	37	did not advance			
