= Swimming Association of Bosnia and Herzegovina =

LEN
- Association crest
- Founded: 2002
- FINA affiliation: 2002
- LEN affiliation: 2002
- Website: plivackisavezbih.ba
- President: Milorad Vulić

The Swimming Federation of Bosnia and Herzegovina (Serbo-Croatian: Plivački savez Bosne i Hercegovine / Пливачки савез Босне и Херцеговине; abbr. PSBiH / ПСБиХ) is the governing body of swimming in Bosnia and Herzegovina. It is a non-profit organization that was founded on 1 December 2002 at a meeting at the Olympic Committee of Bosnia and Herzegovina. It is both a member of LEN and FINA.

== Member clubs ==
As of February 2010 there are 15 member clubs.

- PK Borac, Banja Luka
- APK 22. April, Banja Luka
- PK Banja Luka, Banja Luka
- PK Mladost, Banja Luka
- PK Olymp, Banja Luka
- PK Vrbas, Banja Luka
- PK Savski galeb, Brčko
- PK Lisičići, Konjic
- PK Delfin, Laktaši
- PK Galeb-Gikil, Lukavac
- PK Velež, Mostar
- PK Bosna, Sarajevo
- PK Leotar, Trebinje
- Gradski Klub Vodenih Sportova "Jedinstvo"Tuzla
- PK Aquatech, Tuzla
- PK Sloboda, Tuzla
- PK Zmaj-Alpamm, Tuzla
- PK Željezara, Zenica
