= Third-party and independent members of state legislatures of the United States =

This is a list of persons who have served as members of U.S. state legislatures while enrolled in third parties or as independents For purposes of this list, a third party is defined as any party other than the Democratic Party or the Republican Party. This list spans the period from 1856 to the present. The time period listed beside each elected official's name is the time period when that elected official has served as a state legislator while enrolled as a member of a third party. State legislators who are members of multiple parties, where one or more of the parties is a major party, are not included in this list.

== Alabama ==
=== Alabama Senate ===
Portrait	Name	Party	Start	End	Notes
	James A. Hurst	Populist (Note: Elected on a joint Populist-Republican ticket)	1900	1906	
	Lowell Barron	Democratic (Write in)	1983		First elected as a Democrat, re-elected as a write-in candidate after losing renomination.
	Gerald Dial	Independent	1983		First elected as a Democrat, re-elected as a Independent after losing renomination.
	Harri Anne Smith	Independent	2014	2018	Expelled from the Republican Party after endorsing a Democrat. Caucused with the Republicans.

=== Alabama House of Representatives ===
Portrait	Name	Party	Start	End	Notes
	T. H. Crenshaw	Populist	1900	1902	
	Thomas Blair	Populist	1900	1902	
	L. B. Pounds	Populist	1900	1902	
	J. B. Carmichael	Populist	1900	1902	
	Joseph H. L. Henley	Populist	1900	1902	
	J. S. Hollis	Populist	1900	1902	
	W. H. Bartlett	Populist	1900	1902	
	B. W. Fleming	Independent	1900	1902	
	L. C. Jones	Independent	1900	1902	
	W. J. Mills	Populist	1900	1906	
	W. E. Thomas	Progressive	1914	1918	Elected as a "Bull Moose" Progressive in 1914 and did not stand for re-election.
	Y. L. Burton	Jeffersonian	1930	1934	
	J. W. Hollingsworth	Jeffersonian	1930	1934	Elected as a Jeffersonian in 1930 and was re-elected as a Democrat in 1934.
	J. W. Jordan	Jeffersonian	1930	1934	Elected as a Jeffersonian in 1930, and unsuccessfully ran for re-election in 1934 as a Democrat.
	Thomas Reed	NDPA	1970	1974	First elected as a member of the NDPA in 1970, later re-elected as a Democrat.
	Richard Laird	Independent	2013	2014	Originally elected as a Democrat. Left the party to caucus, as an independent, with the Republicans.

== Alaska ==
=== Alaska House of Representatives ===
Portrait	Name	Party	Start	End	Notes
	Jay Hammond	Independent	1950	1960	Served his first term as an independent before joining the Republican Party. He was later Governor of Alaska.
	Frank R. Ferguson	No Party	1972	1974	Elected as a write-in after losing the Democratic primary as an incumbent. He served in the previous and following legislatures as a Democrat.
	Dick Randolph	Libertarian	1978	1982	Previously elected as a Republican, Randolph switched parties and became the first Libertarian elected to a partisan office in the United States in 1978. Randolph ran as the Libertarian nominee for governor in 1982.
	Ken Fanning	Libertarian	1980	1982	The second Libertarian elected to partisan office in the United States, he served one term in the Alaska House of Representatives. Later served as a Republican in the State Senate.
	Andre Marrou	Libertarian	1984	1986	Elected as a Libertarian for one term. He was Ron Paul's running mate in 1988 and the Libertarian nominee for president in 1992.
	Carl E. Moses	Independence	1992	1994	Elected under Alaskan Independence Party banner. Defected to the Democratic Party in 1994.
	Dan Ortiz	Independent	2014	2024	Retired in 2024.
	Jason Grenn	Independent	2016	2018	Defeated by Republican Sara Rasmussen in 2018.
	Bryce Edgmon	Independent	2019	2026	Left the Democratic Party in 2019. Speaker of the Alaska House of Representatives from 2017 until 2021 and from 2025. Elected to the Alaska Senate in 2026.
	Josiah Patkotak	Independent	2020	2023	Resigned to become Mayor of North Slope Borough in 2023.
	Calvin Schrage	Independent	2020	Present	Former House minority leader from 2023 until 2025.
	Rebecca Himschoot	Independent	2022	Present	
	Alyse Galvin	Independent	2022	Present	Former Democratic nominee for Alaska's at-large congressional district in 2018 and 2020.
	Ky Holland	Independent	2024	Present	
	Kathy Simpler	Independent	2026	Present	

== Arkansas ==
=== Arkansas House of Representatives ===
Portrait	Name	Party	Start	End	Notes
	Richard Carroll	Green	2008	2010	Initially elected to the Arkansas House of Representatives as a Green in 2008, he switched to the Democratic Party in 2009.
	Fred Smith	Green	2012	2014	Smith was originally elected to the Arkansas House of Representatives as a Democrat in 2010, but was forced to give up his seat after a conviction. The conviction was expunged, but the Democrats refused to have him as their candidate in 2012. He ran for re-election as a Green in 2013 and won.
	Nate Bell	Independent	2015	2016	Elected as a Republican in 2013, he left the party in 2015 over differences with the state party.

== California ==
=== California State Senate ===
Portrait	Name	Party	Start	End	Notes
	Charles M. Shortridge	Independent	1902	1906	Represented the Republicans in the Senate until 1902, when he successfully ran for re-election as an independent. Defeated in 1906 by Republican Marshall Black.
	Charles W. Bell	Independent	1906	1912	Self-described independent. Elected to the United States House of Representatives as a Progressive-Republican.
	Prescott F. Cogswell	Progressive	1912	1916	
	Dominic J. Beban	Progressive	1914	1916	Originally elected as a Republican in 1910, he ran for re-election as a Progressive, winning. Died unexpectedly in 1916 of malaria.
	Edward J. Tyrrell	Progressive	1914	1918	Originally elected as a Republican in 1910, he ran for re-election as a Progressive, winning. Did not run again in 1918.
	William S. Scott	Progressive	1914	1918	Originally elected as a Republican in 1910, he ran for re-election as a Progressive, winning. Re-elected in 1918 as a Republican.
	John Joseph Crowley	Progressive	1914	1918	Originally elected to the State House as a Democrat in 1898. He won a seat in the state senate as a Progressive. Re-elected in 1918 as a Republican.
	W. F. Chandler	Progressive	1914	1918	Republican member of the State House from 1900 until 1914, when he was elected as a Progressive to the State Senate.
	William J. Carr	Independent	1912	1914	Elected as an Independent in 1912. Successfully sought re-election as a Progressive in 1914 and as a Republican in 1918.
	William J. Carr	Progressive	1914	1918	Elected as an Independent in 1912. Successfully sought re-election as a Progressive in 1914 and as a Republican in 1918.
	Edgar A. Luce	Progressive	1914	1918	Former City Prosecutor of the City of San Diego. Elected for one term as a Progressive in 1914.

=== California State Assembly ===
Portrait	Name	Party	Start	End	Notes
	John M. Murphy	Union Labor	1902	1904	The only Union Labor member elected under the label in that election. He was the party's nominee for speaker of the House. Did not run for re-election in 1904.
	Mel Vogel	Union Labor/Republican	1904	1908	Also a member of the Republican Party.
	John Wessling	Independence League	1906	1908	One of several candidates for the state legislature endorsed by the Independence League in 1906, and the only one elected without the support of another party. He did not stand for re-election in 1908.
	Daniel J. Toomey	Union Labor/Republican	1906	1908	Also a member of the Republican Party.
	Dennis W. Barry	Union Labor/Republican	1906	1908	Also a member of the Republican Party.
	Henry Thompson	Union Labor/Republican	1906	1908	Also a member of the Republican Party.
	James Edward Hopkins	Union Labor	1908	1910	Future President of the California Labor Federation. Elected for one term on a Union Labour-Democratic-Independence League ticket.
	Thomas H. Silver	Union Labor/Republican	1908	1910	Also a member of the Republican Party.
	Charles W. Kingsley	Socialist	1912	1914	First elected Socialist in California. Lost re-election in 1914 to a Republican.
	Witten William Harris	Socialist	1914	1915	Elected as a Socialist with the support of the Republicans, Democrats and Progressives. Expelled from the Socialists after joining the Non-Partisan Caucus. Re-elected in 1916 as a Democrat.
	George W. Downing	Socialist	1914	1916	One of three Socialists elected to the legislature in 1914. Lost re-election in 1916.
	Lewis A. Spengler	Socialist	1914	1916	One of three Socialists elected to the legislature in 1914. Lost re-election in 1916.
	Frank M. Rutherford	Progressive	1914	1916	Previously elected as a Republican from 1900 until 1912 when he unsuccessfully ran for California's 2nd congressional district in the 1912 election. He was re-elected to his old seat in 1914 as a Progressive.
	Lee Gebhart	Progressive	1914	1916	Re-elected as a Republican in 1916 and 1918.
	William R. Sharkey	Progressive	1914	1916	Elected to the State Senate as a Republican in 1916. Served until 1936.
	Walter A. McDonald	Prohibition	1914	1916	Previously elected as a Republican from 1910 until 1914. Later elected to State Senate in 1916 as a Republican.
	William P. Kennedy	Progressive	1914	1916	Previously elected as a Republican in 1912. Unsuccessfully sought re-election in 1916 as a Progressive.
	Nicholas J. Prendergast	Progressive	1914	1916	Re-elected in 1916 and 1918 as a Republican.
	Joseph Edmund Marron	Progressive	1914	1916	Elected unopposed in 1914 as a Progressive. Unsuccessfully sought re-election in 1916.
	Paul Horcher	Independent	1995		Former Republican who supported incumbent Democratic Speaker Willie Brown after Republicans won the State House. A successful recall election was launched against him in 1995, unseating Horcher.
	Audie Bock	Green	1999	2000	Bock was elected to the California State Assembly as a Green in a special election.
	Juan Arambula	Independent	2009	2010	Left the Democratic Party over disagreements over how to solve the state's budget issues.
	Nathan Fletcher	Independent	2012		Left the Republican Party during his 2012 San Diego mayoral election campaign after not winning the party's nomination.
	Chad Mayes	Independent	2019	2022	Left Republican Party in 2019.

== Connecticut ==
=== Connecticut House of Representatives ===
Portrait	Name	Party	Start	End	Notes
	Jack Bergen	Socialist	1934	1936	Bergen, an ally of Mayor Jasper McLevy, was one of two Socialists elected from the city of Bridgeport in 1934.
	Sadie Griffin	Socialist	1939	1941	Griffin, an ally of Mayor Jasper McLevy, was one of two Socialists elected from the city of Bridgeport in 1938.

=== Connecticut State Senate ===
Portrait	Name	Party	Start	End	Notes
	Edwin Gomes	Working Families	1939	1941	Gomes, a former Democratic member of the Connecticut Senate, was elected to the office for a second time as a member of the Working Families Party. He is the first member of the Working Families Party to win a legislative seat outside of New York and one of the first to win a seat without electoral fusion. Gomes regained the Democratic nomination in the 2016.

== Hawaii ==
=== Hawaii House of Representatives ===
Portrait	Name	Party	Start	End	Notes
	Pāʻele Kiakona	Green	2026	Present	Kiakona is an organizer and now the member-elect of the Hawaii House of Representatives for the 14th district as a member of the Hawaiian Green Party, which includes parts of western Maui. Also the first politician who is neither a Hawaiian Democrat nor a Republican, since Hawaii became a US state in 1959.

== Maine ==
=== Maine House of Representatives ===
Portrait	Name	Party	Start	End	Notes
	George F. Call	Independent	1974	1976	
	Belinda Gerry	Independent	1996	2000	
	John M. Michael	Independent	2000	2002	Michael, who was elected as a Democrat from 1978-1986 and from 1990-1994, ran for United States House of Representatives for Maine's 2nd congressional district in 1994 as an Independent and later for Governor in the 2002 Maine gubernatorial election as an Independent.
	John Eder	Green Independent	2002	2006	Elected as a member of the Green Indpendent party in 2002 and re-elected in 2004. Lost re-election in 2006 to a Democrat. Returned to the House in 2024 as a Republican.
	Richard G. Woodbury	Unenrolled	2002	2008	Elected as an unenrolled member of the state house representing Yarmouth, Woodbury would later serve as an state senator from 2010-2014.
	Troy Jackson	Independent	2002	2004	Jackson was originally elected as an Independent member of the State House before switching his affiliation to Democrat in 2004. As a Democrat, Jackson was elected to the United States Senate in 2026.
	Gary Sukeforth	Unenrolled	2002	2004	Sukeforth served two separate terms as an unenrolled representative.
	Gary Sukeforth	Unenrolled	2014	2016	Sukeforth served two separate terms as an unenrolled representative.
	Jeffrey Evangelos	Unenrolled	2012	2022	
	Joseph E. Brooks	Unenrolled	2012	2014	Brooks was previously elected as a Democrat and served in the State House from 1996-2002 before being elected as an Independent in 2012.
	James J. Campbell	Independent	2012	2016	Campbell was previously elected as a Republican and served in the State House from 2003-2010 before running unenrolled in 2012.
	Kent Ackley	Common Sense Independent	2016	2020	
	Owen Casas	Independent	2016	2018	
	Henry John Bear	Green Independent	2017	2018	Elected as a Democrat representing the Houlton Band of Maliseet Indians, he later joined the Maine Green Independent Party in 2017.
	Ralph Chapman	Independent	2017		Elected as a Democrat, he became an independent and later joined the Maine Green Independent Party in 2017.
	Ralph Chapman	Green Independent	2017	2018	Elected as a Democrat, he became an independent and later joined the Maine Green Independent Party in 2017.
	Denise Harlow	Independent	2017	2018	Elected as a Democrat in 2010 succeeding her father Charles Harlow, she became an independent in 2017.
	William Pluecker	Independent	2018	2026	
	John Andrews	Libertarian	2020	2022	Elected as a Republican, left party and joined the Libertarian Party of Maine due to conflict regarding committee assignments. In 2022, Andrews rejoined the Republican Party after the Libertarian Party of Maine lost its status as an official political party in the state.
	Walter Riseman	Independent	2022	2024	
	Sharon Frost	Independent	2024	Present	
	Shawn Saindon	Independent	2026	Present	
	Clinton Collamore	Independent	2026	Present	

=== Maine Senate ===
Portrait	Name	Party	Start	End	Notes
	Harold Silverman	Independent	1979	1980	Silverman was elected as a Republican to the State House from 1973-1976 before serving as a staffer for Independent governor James B. Longley.
	Jill Goldthwait	Unenrolled	1994	2002	Elected as an unenrolled candidate in 1994, Goldthwait served two terms before retiring due to term limits.
	John Jenkins	Unenrolled	1996	1998	Jenkins was serving as Mayor of Lewiston at the time of his election.
	Richard G. Woodbury	Unenrolled	2010	2014	Woodbury served three terms in the State House of Representatives before being elected to State Senate.

== Maryland ==
=== Maryland House of Delegates ===
Portrait	Name	Party	Start	End	Notes
	Shane Robinson	Green	2018		Elected as a Democrat representing the Maryland House of Delegates' 39th district, he joined the Green Party in 2018.

== Michigan ==
=== Michigan House of Representatives ===
Portrait	Name	Party	Start	End	Notes
	Bert F. Crapser	Progressive	1913	1914	Elected to the Michigan House of Representatives as a Progressive in 1912, and served one term ending in 1914.
	J. Weston Hutchins	Progressive	1913	1914	Elected to the Michigan House of Representatives as a Progressive in 1912, and served one term ending in 1914.

== Montana ==
=== Montana House of Representatives ===
Portrait	Name	Party	Start	End	Notes
	Rick Jore	Constitution	2006	2008	Jore served as a Republican in the Montana House of Representatives from 1995 to 2000. In 2000, he left the Republican Party to seek a fourth term as a member of the Constitution Party. He then ran four times as a Constitution Party candidate before winning office in 2006.

== Nebraska ==
=== Nebraska Legislature ===
(Note: While Nebraska's unicameral legislature is nominally nonpartisan, most members belong to and are supported by one of the two major political parties.)

Portrait	Name	Party	Start	End	Notes
	Ernie Chambers	Independent	1970	1988	Formerly the sole non-affiliated member in the Nebraska legislature, belonging to neither the Democratic nor Republican parties. Chambers was a former member of the New Alliance Party.
	Ernie Chambers	New Alliance Party	1988		Formerly the sole non-affiliated member in the Nebraska legislature, belonging to neither the Democratic nor Republican parties. Chambers was a former member of the New Alliance Party.
	Ernie Chambers	Independent	1998	2008	Formerly the sole non-affiliated member in the Nebraska legislature, belonging to neither the Democratic nor Republican parties. Chambers was a former member of the New Alliance Party.
	Ernie Chambers	Independent	2012	2020	Formerly the sole non-affiliated member in the Nebraska legislature, belonging to neither the Democratic nor Republican parties. Chambers was a former member of the New Alliance Party.
	Laura Ebke	Libertarian	2016	2018	Elected as a Republican-endorsed candidate, she joined the Libertarian Party in 2016.

== Nevada ==
=== Nevada State Assembly ===
Portrait	Name	Party	Start	End	Notes
	John Moore	Libertarian	2016		Elected to the Nevada Assembly as a Republican, Moore switched to Libertarian Party in 2016.

== New Hampshire ==
=== New Hampshire House of Representatives ===
Portrait	Name	Party	Start	End	Notes
	Finlay Rothhaus	Libertarian	1991	1995	Originally a member of the Republican Party, Rothhaus joined the Libertarian Party in 1991.
	Calvin Warburton	Libertarian	1992	1995	Elected as a Libertarian.
	Andy Borsa	Libertarian	1992	1994	Elected in 1992 as a Libertarian.
	Don Gorman	Libertarian	1992	2000	Elected in 1992 as a Libertarian. He ran for the Libertarian presidential nomination in 2000, losing to Harry Browne.
	Jim McClarin	Libertarian	1994	1995	Elected as a Libertarian.
	Steve Vaillancourt	Libertarian	2000	2002	Originally elected as a Democrat, he was re-elected on the Libertarian ticket in 2000 before choosing to retire. He was elected in 2006 as a Republican.
	Max Abramson	Libertarian	2016	2017	Abramson has held office as a Republican and a Libertarian. Attempted to obtain the 2020 presidential nomination from the Veterans Party and the Reform Party
	Max Abramson	Veterans	2020		Abramson has held office as a Republican and a Libertarian. Attempted to obtain the 2020 presidential nomination from the Veterans Party and the Reform Party
	Max Abramson	Reform	2020		Abramson has held office as a Republican and a Libertarian. Attempted to obtain the 2020 presidential nomination from the Veterans Party and the Reform Party
	Caleb Q. Dyer	Libertarian	2017		Elected in 2016 as a Republican. He switched his party affiliation to Libertarian in 2017.
	Brandon Phinney	Libertarian	2017	2018	Libertarian member since 2017. Re-elected as a Republican in 2022.
	Joseph Stallcop	Libertarian	2017	2018	Elected in 2016 as a Democrat, he became a Libertarian in 2017.

== New Jersey ==
=== New Jersey General Assembly ===
Portrait	Name	Party	Start	End	Notes
	Matt Ahearn	Green	2003		Elected as a Democrat. He switched his party affiliation to Green following dissatisfaction with the Democrats for corruption.

== New York ==
=== New York State Assembly ===
Portrait	Name	Party	Start	End	Notes
	Timothy P. Gordon	Independence	2006	2010	Served two terms in the Assembly as a member of the Independence Party.
	Fred Thiele	Independence	2009	2022	Thiele was originally elected to the Assembly as a member of the Republican Party, but on October 1, 2009 switched to the Independence Party of New York and caucused with the Democrats. In 2022, Thiele officially switched to the Democratic Party, after the Independence Party of New York lost its status as an official political party in New York State.
	Angela Wozniak	Conservative	2014	2016	A member of the Conservative Party, Wozniak was elected to the New York State Assembly in 2014. She caucused with the Republicans.
	Diana Richardson	Working Families	2015	2016	Was elected as a member of the Working Families Party in a 2015 special election in which no Democratic candidate was on the ballot. She was the first member of the New York Working Families Party to be elected only on the Working Families ballot line.

== Rhode Island ==
=== Rhode Island House of Representatives ===
Portrait	Name	Party	Start	End	Notes
	Daniel P. Gordon	Libertarian	2012		After being expelled from the Republican Party, Gordon joined the Libertarian Party, becoming the party's sole legislator during his tenure.

== Utah ==
=== Utah State Senate ===
Portrait	Name	Party	Start	End	Notes
	Mark B. Madsen	Libertarian	2016		Chose in July 2016 to be a Libertarian for the remainder of his final term in the Utah Senate.
	Daniel Thatcher	Forward	2025		Elected as a Republican. Served as a Republican until March 2025, when he registered with the Forward Party.
	Emily Buss	Forward	2025	Present	A member of the Forward Party, she won a poll held by the party to choose a successor for outgoing Forward senator Daniel Thatcher.

== Vermont ==
=== Vermont Senate ===
Portrait	Name	Party	Start	End	Notes
	Anthony Pollina	Progressive	2010	2022	A Progressive member who ran with the support of the Democratic and Progressive parties through electoral fusion.
	David Zuckerman	Progressive	2012	2016	A Progressive member who ran with the support of the Democratic and Progressive parties through electoral fusion. Zuckerman served in the Vermont House of Representatives from 1997 to 2011 and in the Vermont Senate from 2013 to 2017. As Progressive/Democrat, he was sworn in as lieutenant governor on January 5, 2017.
	Christopher Pearson	Progressive	2016	2022	Progressive member who served in the Vermont House of Representatives from 2009 to 2006 and 2011 to 2017 and the Vermont Senate from 2017 to 2023.

=== Vermont House of Representatives ===
Portrait	Name	Party	Start	End	Notes
	Terry Bouricius	Progressive	1990	2000	Served as a Progressive member from 1990 to 2000.
	Dean Corren	Progressive	1996	2000	Served as a Progressive member from 1996 to 2000. He was the nominee of both the Progressive Party and the Democratic Party for lieutenant governor in 2014.
	Carina Driscoll	Progressive	2000	2002	Served as a Progressive member. She is the step-daughter of Independent U.S. Senator Bernie Sanders.
	Bob Kiss	Progressive	2000	2006	Progressive member representing Chittenden-3-4 from 2001 to 2006. Resigned from position after being elected Mayor of Burlington.
	Sarah Edwards	Progressive	2002	2012	Served as a Progressive member from 2002 to 2012.
	Winston Dowland	Progressive	2004	2006	Served as a Progressive member from 2003 to 2007.
	Dexter Randall	Progressive	2004	2008	Progressive member representing Orleans-Franklin.
	Sandy Haas	Progressive	2004	2020	Progressive member representing Windsor-Rutland.
	Susan Hatch Davis	Progressive	2006	2016	Progressive member representing Orange-1.
	Mollie Burke	Progressive	2008	Present	Progressive member representing Windham-2-2.
	Robin Chesnut-Tangerman	Progressive	2014	2020	Progressive member representing Rutland-Bennington.
	Diana Gonzalez	Progressive	2014	2020	Progressive member representing Chittenden-6-7.
	Jarrod Sammis	Libertarian	2023	2024	Elected as a Republican member, changed affiliation to Libertarian in May 2023 Did not seek re-election in 2024.

== Wyoming ==
=== Wyoming House of Representatives ===
Portrait	Name	Party	Start	End	Notes
	Jim Roscoe	Independent	2018	2022	Independent. Previously served as a Democrat from 2009 to 2013.
	Marshall Burt	Libertarian	2020	2022	Libertarian member of the Wyoming House of Representatives
