= 2010 Montana House of Representatives election =

- November 2, 2010

All 100 seats of the Montana House of Representatives 51 seats needed for a majority
- Registered: 651,335 ▼2.51%
- Turnout: 56.36% ▼18.12%
	Majority party	Minority party
Leader	Mike Milburn	Jon Sesso
Party	Republican	Democratic
Leader's seat	19th district	76th district
Last election	50	50
Seats won	68	32
Seat change	▲18	▼18
Popular vote	205,127	126,357
Percentage	60.96%	37.55%
Swing	▲10.78%	▼11.32%
- Results: Democratic hold Republican hold Republican gain
Speaker before election
Bob Bergren
Democratic
Elected Speaker
Mike Milburn
Republican

An election was held on November 2, 2010 to elect all 100 members to Montana's House of Representatives. The election coincided with elections for other offices, including U.S. Senate, U.S. House of Representatives and State Senate. The primary election was held on June 8, 2010.

A loss of 18 seats by the Democrats resulted in the Republicans winning 68 seats compared to 32 seats for the Democrats. Republicans regained control of the House after two years of Democratic control.

== Predictions ==
Source	Ranking	As of
Governing	Lean R (flip)	November 1, 2010

== Results ==
=== Statewide ===
Statewide results of the 2010 Montana House of Representatives election:

Party	Candi- dates	Votes			Seats		
Party	Candi- dates	No.	%	+/–	No.	+/–	%
Republican Party	90	205,127	60.96%	▲10.78%	68	▲18	68.00%
Democratic Party	81	126,357	37.55%	▼11.32%	32	▼18	32.00%
Libertarian Party	5	1,987	0.59%	▲0.50%	0	Steady	0.00%
Constitution Party	3	1,400	0.42%	▲0.06%	0	Steady	0.00%
Green Party	1	1,052	0.31%	New	0	Steady	0.00%
Independent	2	580	0.17%	▼0.32%	0	Steady	0.00%
Total	182	336,503	100.00%	Steady	100	Steady	100.00%

=== District ===
Results of the 2010 Montana House of Representatives election by district:

District	Democratic		Republican		Others		Total votes	Result
District	Votes	%	Votes	%	Votes	%	Total votes	Result
1st district	888	28.66%	2,210	71.34%	—	—	3,098	Republican hold
2nd district	1,190	30.07%	2,767	69.93%	—	—	3,957	Republican hold
3rd district	1,308	39.15%	1,747	52.29%	286	8.56%	3,341	Republican hold
4th district	1,859	48.88%	1,944	51.12%	—	—	3,803	Republican gain
5th district	876	19.81%	3,547	80.19%	—	—	4,423	Republican hold
6th district	1,546	32.51%	3,209	67.49%	—	—	4,755	Republican hold
7th district	859	27.62%	2,251	72.38%	—	—	3,110	Republican hold
8th district	1,031	36.95%	1,465	52.51%	294	10.54%	2,790	Republican gain
9th district	1,292	27.99%	3,324	72.01%	—	—	4,616	Republican hold
10th district	916	20.58%	3,536	79.42%	—	—	4,452	Republican hold
11th district	—	—	3,160	75.02%	1,052	24.98%	4,212	Republican hold
12th district	1,651	47.14%	1,851	52.86%	—	—	3,502	Republican gain
13th district	1,201	25.16%	3,572	74.84%	—	—	4,773	Republican hold
14th district	1,299	31.38%	2,841	68.62%	—	—	4,140	Republican hold
15th district	1,108	48.43%	1,180	51.57%	—	—	2,288	Republican gain
16th district	729	46.20%	849	53.80%	—	—	1,578	Republican gain
17th district	1,593	43.60%	2,061	56.40%	—	—	3,654	Republican hold
18th district	—	—	3,405	100.00%	—	—	3,405	Republican hold
19th district	—	—	2,972	100.00%	—	—	2,972	Republican hold
20th district	1,101	41.07%	1,580	58.93%	—	—	2,681	Republican gain
21st district	1,646	58.14%	1,185	41.86%	—	—	2,831	Democratic hold
22nd district	1,243	56.30%	706	31.97%	259	11.73%	2,208	Democratic hold
23rd district	1,241	60.10%	824	39.90%	—	—	2,065	Democratic hold
24th district	626	42.35%	852	57.65%	—	—	1,478	Republican hold
25th district	1,828	45.33%	2,205	54.67%	—	—	4,033	Republican gain
26th district	1,613	58.46%	1,146	41.54%	—	—	2,759	Democratic hold
27th district	771	25.35%	2,271	74.65%	—	—	3,042	Republican hold
28th district	—	—	3,062	100.00%	—	—	3,062	Republican hold
29th district	1,556	39.72%	2,361	60.28%	—	—	3,917	Republican hold
30th district	—	—	3,527	100.00%	—	—	3,527	Republican hold
31st district	1,908	100.00%	—	—	—	—	1,908	Democratic hold
32nd district	1,276	100.00%	—	—	—	—	1,276	Democratic hold
33rd district	1,066	35.63%	1,926	64.37%	—	—	2,992	Republican gain
34th district	1,079	37.35%	1,810	62.65%	—	—	2,889	Republican hold
35th district	—	—	3,501	100.00%	—	—	3,501	Republican hold
36th district	1,729	44.30%	2,174	55.70%	—	—	3,903	Republican gain
37th district	—	—	3,205	100.00%	—	—	3,205	Republican hold
38th district	1,735	47.31%	1,932	52.69%	—	—	3,667	Republican gain
39th district	765	19.04%	3,253	80.96%	—	—	4,018	Republican hold
40th district	1,763	60.38%	1,157	39.62%	—	—	2,920	Democratic hold
41st district	786	41.02%	1,130	58.98%	—	—	1,916	Republican gain
42nd district	1,676	58.46%	1,191	41.54%	—	—	2,867	Democratic hold
43rd district	930	24.93%	2,801	75.07%	—	—	3,731	Republican hold
44th district	1,165	37.45%	1,946	62.55%	—	—	3,111	Republican hold
45th district	—	—	3,165	100.00%	—	—	3,165	Republican hold
46th district	—	—	4,453	100.00%	—	—	4,453	Republican hold
47th district	1,730	44.00%	2,202	56.00%	—	—	3,932	Republican hold
48th district	1,300	42.83%	1,735	57.17%	—	—	3,035	Republican gain
49th district	1,512	59.32%	1,037	40.68%	—	—	2,549	Democratic hold
50th district	1,582	44.02%	2,012	55.98%	—	—	3,594	Republican hold
51st district	1,069	55.88%	844	44.12%	—	—	1,913	Democratic hold
52nd district	1,403	52.78%	1,255	47.22%	—	—	2,658	Democratic hold
53rd district	1,026	39.49%	1,572	60.51%	—	—	2,598	Republican hold
54th district	1,208	50.93%	1,164	49.07%	—	—	2,372	Democratic hold
55th district	1,288	31.11%	2,852	68.89%	—	—	4,140	Republican hold
56th district	—	—	3,679	100.00%	—	—	3,679	Republican hold
57th district	—	—	3,916	100.00%	—	—	3,916	Republican hold
58th district	1,297	36.48%	2,258	63.52%	—	—	3,555	Republican hold
59th district	1,990	45.06%	2,426	54.94%	—	—	4,416	Republican gain
60th district	—	—	3,429	100.00%	—	—	3,429	Republican hold
61st district	—	—	3,730	100.00%	—	—	3,730	Republican hold
62nd district	1,755	49.86%	1,765	50.14%	—	—	3,520	Republican gain
63rd district	2,664	49.34%	2,735	50.66%	—	—	5,399	Republican gain
64th district	1,979	55.37%	1,595	44.63%	—	—	3,574	Democratic hold
65th district	1,288	65.95%	665	34.05%	—	—	1,953	Democratic hold
66th district	1,747	59.73%	1,178	40.27%	—	—	2,925	Democratic hold
67th district	1,269	28.58%	3,171	71.42%	—	—	4,440	Republican hold
68th district	1,329	27.45%	3,513	72.55%	—	—	4,842	Republican hold
69th district	1,556	30.82%	3,493	69.18%	—	—	5,049	Republican hold
70th district	1,736	37.98%	2,835	62.02%	—	—	4,571	Republican hold
71st district	—	—	3,523	100.00%	—	—	3,523	Republican hold
72nd district	—	—	3,332	100.00%	—	—	3,332	Republican hold
73rd district	1,868	62.60%	1,116	37.40%	—	—	2,984	Democratic hold
74th district	1,834	49.72%	1,855	50.28%	—	—	3,689	Republican gain
75th district	2,247	100.00%	—	—	—	—	2,247	Democratic hold
76th district	1,761	100.00%	—	—	—	—	1,761	Democratic hold
77th district	2,168	45.79%	2,567	54.21%	—	—	4,735	Republican hold
78th district	1,413	41.27%	2,011	58.73%	—	—	3,424	Republican gain
79th district	2,930	100.00%	—	—	—	—	2,930	Democratic hold
80th district	1,700	44.26%	2,141	55.74%	—	—	3,841	Republican gain
81st district	2,115	67.83%	1,003	32.17%	—	—	3,118	Democratic hold
82nd district	2,312	59.43%	1,578	40.57%	—	—	3,890	Democratic hold
83rd district	—	—	3,592	100.00%	—	—	3,592	Republican hold
84th district	—	—	3,273	81.85%	726	18.15%	3,999	Republican hold
85th district	1,809	100.00%	—	—	—	—	1,809	Democratic hold
86th district	2,684	100.00%	—	—	—	—	2,684	Democratic hold
87th district	—	—	3,586	82.34%	769	17.66%	4,355	Republican hold
88th district	1,566	39.46%	2,244	56.54%	159	4.01%	3,969	Republican hold
89th district	—	—	3,570	80.75%	851	19.25%	4,421	Republican hold
90th district	1,455	35.22%	2,463	59.62%	213	5.16%	4,131	Republican hold
91st district	1,718	52.41%	1,560	47.59%	—	—	3,278	Democratic hold
92nd district	2,235	50.39%	2,080	46.90%	120	2.71%	4,435	Democratic hold
93rd district	2,578	100.00%	—	—	—	—	2,578	Democratic hold
94th district	2,607	100.00%	—	—	—	—	2,607	Democratic hold
95th district	2,395	100.00%	—	—	—	—	2,395	Democratic hold
96th district	1,783	58.73%	1,253	41.27%	—	—	3,036	Democratic hold
97th district	2,019	62.64%	1,204	37.36%	—	—	3,223	Democratic hold
98th district	2,019	52.74%	1,809	47.26%	—	—	3,828	Democratic hold
99th district	1,946	57.17%	1,168	34.31%	290	8.52%	3,404	Democratic hold
100th district	1,618	46.20%	1,884	53.80%	—	—	3,502	Republican hold
Total	126,357	37.55%	205,127	60.96%	5,019	1.49%	336,503	
