= 1906 Alabama Senate election =

- November 6, 1906

35 seats in the Alabama State Senate 18 seats needed for a majority
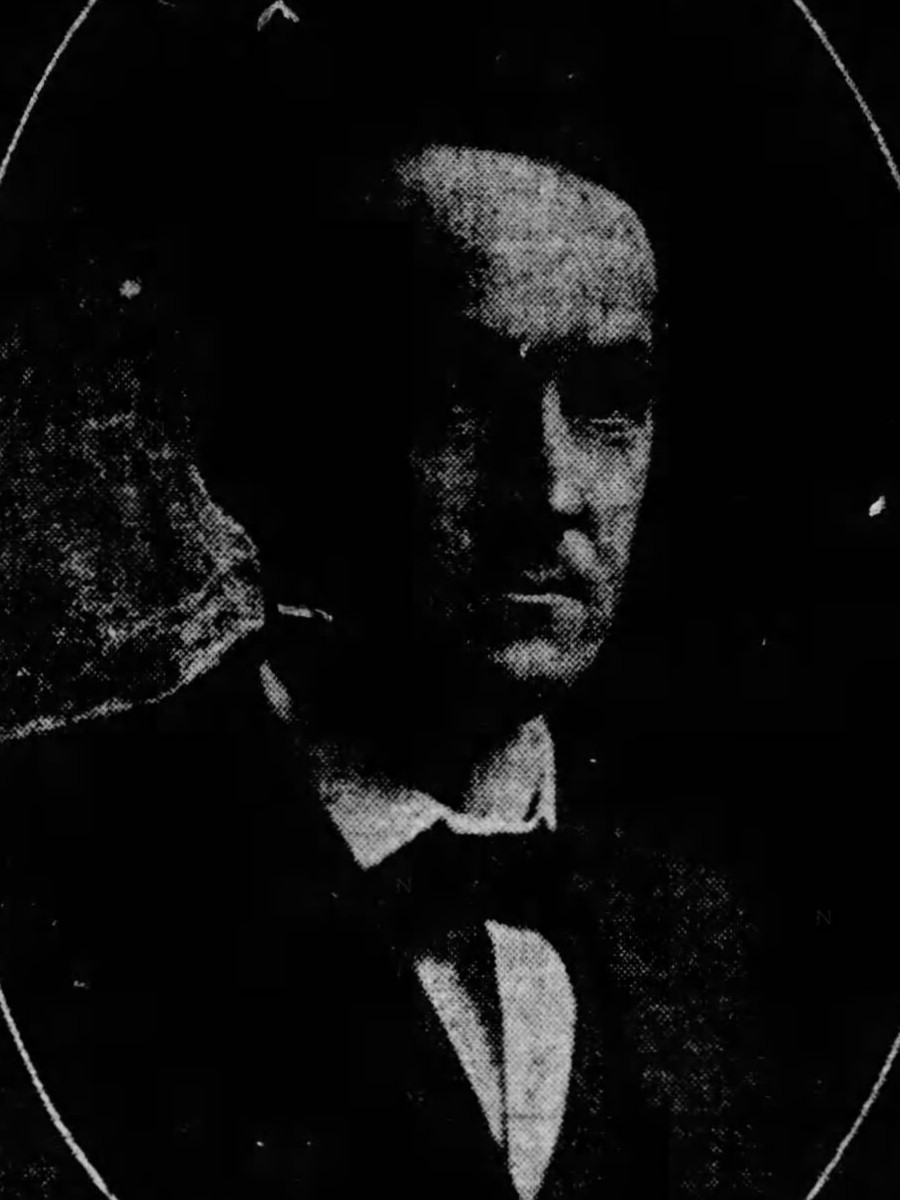

	Majority party	Minority party	Third party
Leader	Joel W. Goldsby (did not stand)	—	James A. Hurst (de facto)
Party	Democratic	Republican	Populist
Leader since	January 13, 1903	—	—
Leader's seat	33rd–Mobile Co.	—	6th–Etowah Co.
Seats before	34	0	1
Seats won	35	0	0
Seat change	▲1	Steady	▼1
Popular vote	59,253	7,876	283
Percentage	87.90%	11.68%	0.42%
- Democratic gain Democratic hold
President pro tempore before election
Joel W. Goldsby
Democratic
Elected President pro tempore
Democratic

The 1906 Alabama Senate election took place on Tuesday, November 6, 1906, to elect 106 representatives to serve four-year terms in the Alabama House of Representatives. The election used the same districts first drawn by the Alabama Constitution of 1901.

The only non-Democratic senator, Populist James A. Hurst of Etowah County (District 6) did not seek re-election, but unsuccessfully sought the Republican nomination for Alabama's 7th congressional district. E. P. Thomas of Barbour County was unanimously elected President pro tempore of the Senate when the legislature convened on January 8, 1907.

The election took place concurrently with elections for U.S. House, governor, state house, and numerous other state and local offices.

== General election results ==
District	Democrats			Republicans			Populists			Total		
District	Candidate	Votes	%	Candidate	Votes	%	Candidate	Votes	%	Votes	Maj.	Mrg.
3rd	John F. Wilson	2,893	56.28%	M. M. Davidson	2,247	43.72%	—	—	—	5,140	+646	+12.57%
5th	John A. Lusk	2,073	87.99%	—	—	—	J. R. Gayle	283	12.01%	2,356	+1,790	+75.98%
6th	E. D. Hamner	1,934	57.70%	E. H. Cross	1,418	42.30%	—	—	—	3,352	+516	+15.39%
7th	F. L. Blackmon (inc.)	1,262	88.50%	E. M. Lewis	164	11.50%	—	—	—	1,426	+1,098	+77.00%
12th	M. L. Leith	3,407	67.48%	S. R. Crumpton	1,642	32.52%	—	—	—	5,049	+1,765	+34.96% (Rep)
15th	H. S. Doster	2,557	55.55%	W. W. Wadsworth	2,046	44.45%	—	—	—	4,603	+511	+11.10%
23rd	P. B. Davis	1,669	83.70%	Thomas Gulley	325	16.30%	—	—	—	1,994	+1,344	+67.40%
29th	W. W. Barbour	2,211	98.49%	R. L. Lee	34	1.51%	—	—	—	2,245	+2,177	+96.97%
Source: Alabama Official and Statistical Register, 1907. (p. 255–258)

=== Elected unopposed ===
- District 1: W. N. Hayes received 1,614 votes.
- District 2: W. T. Lowe received 1,568 votes.
- District 4: R. E. Spragins (inc.) received 1,261 votes.
- District 8: J. W. Heacock received 837 votes.
- District 9: J. W. Overton received 1,489 votes.
- District 10: J. W. Strother received 1,947 votes.
- District 11: Frank S. Moody received 1,317 votes.
- District 13: Nathan L. Miller received 6,192 votes.
- District 14: G. B. Wimberly received 1,218 votes.
- District 16: Evans Hinson received 509 votes.
- District 17: C. E. Reid received 2,162 votes.
- District 18: H. E. Reynolds received 1,032 votes.
- District 19: Norman Gunn (inc.) received 1,447 votes.
- District 20: John J. King received 724 votes.
- District 21: O. O. Bayles received 1,089 votes.
- District 22: W. C. Jones (inc.) received 611 votes.
- District 24: E. P. Thomas (inc.) received 970 votes.
- District 25: Lucien D. Gardner received 3,359 votes.
- District 26: Henry P. Merritt received 734 votes.
- District 27: E. H. Glenn received 1,006 votes.
- District 28: Charles B. Teasley received 1,345 votes.
- District 30: Henry F. Reese received 734 votes.
- District 31: G. T. McWhorter received 2,094 votes.
- District 32: Amos Horton received 896 votes.
- District 33: Max Hamburger Jr. received 878 votes.
- District 34: D. M. White received 3,010 votes.
- District 35: B. A. Forrester received 1,204 votes.

== See also ==
- Category:1906 elections in Alabama
  - 1906 United States House of Representatives elections in Alabama
  - 1906 Alabama gubernatorial election
  - 1906 Alabama House of Representatives election
- 1906 United States elections
