= Nate Bell =

American politician

Member of the Arkansas House of Representatives from the 20th district
- In office January 2013 – January 2017
- Succeeded by: John Maddox

Member of the Arkansas House of Representatives from the 22nd district
- In office January 2011 – January 2013
- Preceded by: Bill Abernathy
- Succeeded by: Bruce Westerman

Personal details
- Born: July 17, 1969 (age 57) Mena, Arkansas
- Party: Independent (2015–present); Republican (until 2015)
- Occupation: Real estate developer

Jerry Nathan Bell, known as Nate Bell (born July 17, 1969), is an Independent politician from Mena in the U.S. state of Arkansas, who served three two-year terms in the Arkansas House of Representatives. From 2013 to 2017, he represented District 20, which encompasses Polk and Montgomery counties. From 2011 to 2013, he was the representative for District 22. He was a Republican prior to 2015.

== Business career ==
Bell is founder and managing partner of Quad B Specialties, LLC, a licensed commercial and residential construction firm.

== Early political career ==
Bell was elected constable of Potter Township in Polk County in 2004, 2006, and 2008.

== General Assembly ==
In 2010, Bell defeated the Democrat Orvin Foster, 5,022 (60 percent) to 3,355 (40 percent) to win the District 22 seat vacated by the Democrat Bill Abernathy.

In 2012, Bell was switched to District 20, in which he defeated another Democrat, Lewis Diggs, 6,696 to 3,592. This seat was vacated by the Democrat, the term-limited Johnnie Roebuck.

In the 89th General Assembly, Bell served on the House Revenue and Taxation Committee and the State Agencies and Governmental Affairs Committee.

In March 2015, Bell provided forceful support for fellow legislator Justin Harris during his rehoming (aka child abandonment) scandal.

=== Voting history ===
Bell's voting includes:

Date	Bill number	Bill name	Vote
March 20, 2013	HB 1855	Classifies the Office of Prosecuting Attorney as Nonpartisan	Yea
March 19, 2013	HB 1819	Prohibits Governor from Regulating Firearms in an Emergency	Yea
March 19, 2013	SB 417	Penalties for Violent Offenses Against Fetuses	Yea
March 13, 2013	SB 2	Requires Photo ID to Vote	Yea
March 12, 2013	HB 1357	Requires Municipal Special Elections to Be On Certain DaysFee	Yea
March 6, 2013	SB 134	Prohibits Abortion if Fetal Heartbeat Detected	Yea
March 5, 2013	HB 1041	Establishes a Spending Cap on the State Budget	Yea
Feb. 27, 2013	HB 1037	Prohibits Abortions After 20 Weeks	Yea
Feb. 21, 2013	SB 134	Prohibits Abortion if Fetal Heartbeat Detected	Yea
Feb. 21, 2013	HB 1037	Prohibits Abortions After 20 Weeks	Yea
Feb. 18, 2013	HB 1295	Establishes Tiered System for Lottery Scholarships	Yea
Feb. 15, 2013	HB 1243	Authorizes University Staff to Carry a Concealed Handgun	Yea
Feb. 4, 2013	HB 1037	Prohibits Abortions After 20 Weeks	Yea
Feb. 4, 2013	HB 1100	Prohibits Abortion Coverage on the State Health Insurance Exchange	Yea
April 12, 2011	SB 972	Congressional Redistricting	Yea
March 25, 2011	HB 1958	Authorizes Concealed Handguns In Places of Worship	Yea
March 25, 2011	HB 1032	Curriculum Standards for Bible Instruction in School Districts	Yea
March 23, 2011	HB 2007	Requires Driver's License Exams to be in English Only	Yea
March 21, 2011	HB 1797	Requires Proof of Identity to Vote	Yea
Feb. 16, 2011	HB 1052	Reducing Taxes on Manufacturer Utilities	Yea
Feb. 16, 2011	HB 1002	Capital Gains Reduction Act	Yea
Jan. 20, 2011	HB 1115	Absentee Mayor	Yea
March 29, 2011	HB 1226	2011-2012 State Insurance Department Budget	Nay
March 17, 2011	HB 1936	Dress Codes for Public Schools	Nay
Feb. 15, 2011	SB 154	Cell Phones in School Zones	Nay
Feb. 7, 2011	HB 1013	Hiring of Unauthorized Workers Bill Passed	Nay
Feb. 1, 2011	HB 1049	Prohibit Cell Phone Use in School Zones Bill Passed	Nay
Jan. 31, 2011	HB 1049	Prohibit Cell Phone Use in School Zones	Nay
March 31, 2011	HB 1226	2011-2012 State Insurance Department Budget	Abstained

== Controversies ==
Bell is nationally known for his polarizing and controversial commentary on social issues, including:

=== The Hitler incident ===
Bell received criticism for "misquoting" Adolf Hitler's Mein Kampf. The quote was considered incorrect by those opposing Bell's political positions, nonetheless Bell stood by the quote.

=== The abortion incident ===
Bell exchanged e-mails with an Arkansas resident living outside his district, regarding his stance on abortion.

=== Boston Marathon bombing comments ===
In response to news reports of a lockdown in the Boston metropolitan area, on April 19, 2013, Bell tweeted, "I wonder how many Boston liberals spent the night cowering in their homes wishing they had an AR-15 with a hi-capacity magazine?".

Bell's remarks outraged many in Massachusetts, Arkansas, and throughout the country. The Republican then Speaker of the Arkansas House of Representatives, Davy Carter, called the remark "inappropriate and insensitive." Then Democratic minority leader Greg Leding of Fayetteville, said, "The people of Boston are not cowards. They are patriots. ... No one, including Representative Bell, should ever infer that the American people are anything other than courageous, and the only words we should be offering to the people of Boston are those of support and of prayer."

== Personal life ==
Bell is involved in many community and civic organizations, including Rotary International, 4-H Clubs (volunteer leader), Poultry Partners, the National Rifle Association of America, and the Polk County Farm Bureau. He is also a member of LeadAR, the Western Arkansas Fire Rescue Association, and the Potter Volunteer Fire Department. Bell attends the non-denominational Grace Bible Church. Bell and his wife, Phyllis, have two daughters, Victoria and Hannah.

Bell did not seek a fourth term in the state House in 2016. A Republican, John Maddox instead won the position. Bell still has ten years of eligibility in the state legislature should he decide to serve again.

Preceded by Bill Abernathy	Arkansas State Representative for District 22 (formerly Polk County; now Garland County); 2011–2013	Succeeded by Bruce Westerman
Preceded by Johnnie Roebuck	Arkansas State Representative for District 20 (Polk and Montgomery counties); 2013–2017	Succeeded by John Maddox
