= 2008 Montana House of Representatives election =

- November 4, 2008

All 100 seats of the Montana House of Representatives 51 seats needed for a majority
- Registered: 668,085 ▲2.87%
- Turnout: 74.48% ▲11.18%
	Majority party	Minority party
Leader	Bob Bergren	Scott Sales
Party	Democratic	Republican
Leader's seat	33rd district	68th district
Last election	49	50
Seats won	50	50
Seat change	▲1	Steady
Popular vote	221,080	227,019
Percentage	48.87%	50.18%
Swing	▼0.39%	▲1.05%
- Results: Democratic hold Democratic gain Republican hold Republican gain
Speaker before election
Scott Sales
Republican
Elected Speaker
Bob Bergren
Democratic

An election was held on November 4, 2008, to elect all 100 members to Montana's House of Representatives. The election coincided with elections for other offices, including U.S. President, U.S. Senate, U.S. House of Representatives, Governor and State Senate. The primary election was held on June 3, 2008.

A net gain of one seat by the Democrats resulted in the House being tied at 50 seats each. Democrats regained control of the House after two years by virtue of Governor Brian Schweitzer being a Democrat.

== Predictions ==
Source	Ranking	As of
Stateline	Tossup	October 15, 2008

== Results ==
=== Statewide ===
Statewide results of the 2008 Montana House of Representatives election:

Party	Candi- dates	Votes			Seats		
Party	Candi- dates	No.	%	+/–	No.	+/–	%
Republican Party	90	227,019	50.18%	▲1.05%	50	Steady	50.00%
Democratic Party	93	221,080	48.87%	▼0.39%	50	▲1	50.00%
Independent	2	2,229	0.49%	▲0.42%	0	Steady	0.00%
Constitution Party	6	1,623	0.36%	▼1.19%	0	▼1	0.00%
Libertarian Party	2	422	0.09%	New	0	Steady	0.00%
Total	193	452,373	100.00%	Steady	100	Steady	100.00%

=== District ===
Results of the 2008 Montana House of Representatives election by district:

District	Democratic		Republican		Others		Total votes	Result
District	Votes	%	Votes	%	Votes	%	Total votes	Result
1st district	1,496	36.94%	2,416	59.65%	138	3.41%	4,050	Republican Hold
2nd district	1,656	33.81%	3,242	66.19%	—	—	4,898	Republican Hold
3rd district	1,970	42.80%	2,633	57.20%	—	—	4,603	Republican Gain
4th district	2,948	52.82%	2,633	47.18%	—	—	5,581	Democratic Hold
5th district	1,543	27.64%	4,039	72.36%	—	—	5,582	Republican Hold
6th district	2,692	43.48%	3,179	51.34%	321	5.18%	6,192	Republican Hold
7th district	1,356	31.59%	2,937	68.41%	—	—	4,293	Republican Hold
8th district	2,029	50.17%	2,015	49.83%	—	—	4,044	Democratic Gain
9th district	2,303	38.58%	3,666	61.42%	—	—	5,969	Republican Hold
10th district	1,632	27.00%	4,412	73.00%	—	—	6,044	Republican Hold
11th district	2,203	39.25%	3,410	60.75%	—	—	5,613	Republican Hold
12th district	2,736	62.87%	1,616	37.13%	—	—	4,352	Democratic Gain
13th district	2,100	38.91%	3,147	58.31%	150	2.78%	5,397	Republican Hold
14th district	1,708	35.61%	3,088	64.39%	—	—	4,796	Republican Hold
15th district	2,810	100.00%	—	—	—	—	2,810	Democratic Hold
16th district	2,833	100.00%	—	—	—	—	2,833	Democratic Hold
17th district	2,019	46.06%	2,364	53.94%	—	—	4,383	Republican Hold
18th district	1,722	32.88%	3,516	67.12%	—	—	5,238	Republican Hold
19th district	1,925	42.68%	2,585	57.32%	—	—	4,510	Republican Hold
20th district	1,911	53.05%	1,592	44.20%	99	2.75%	3,602	Democratic Hold
21st district	2,117	53.80%	1,691	42.97%	127	3.23%	3,935	Democratic Hold
22nd district	2,417	75.41%	—	—	788	24.59%	3,205	Democratic Hold
23rd district	1,657	52.12%	1,522	47.88%	—	—	3,179	Democratic Hold
24th district	1,034	49.00%	1,076	51.00%	—	—	2,110	Republican Gain
25th district	3,111	64.53%	1,471	30.51%	239	4.96%	4,821	Democratic Hold
26th district	2,365	65.88%	1,225	34.12%	—	—	3,590	Democratic Hold
27th district	—	—	3,508	100.00%	—	—	3,508	Republican Hold
28th district	1,969	45.24%	2,383	54.76%	—	—	4,352	Republican Hold
29th district	1,891	42.02%	2,609	57.98%	—	—	4,500	Republican Hold
30th district	1,855	37.38%	3,108	62.62%	—	—	4,963	Republican Hold
31st district	2,749	100.00%	—	—	—	—	2,749	Democratic Hold
32nd district	2,482	100.00%	—	—	—	—	2,482	Democratic Hold
33rd district	2,277	64.10%	1,275	35.90%	—	—	3,552	Democratic Hold
34th district	1,428	41.15%	2,042	58.85%	—	—	3,470	Republican Gain
35th district	779	19.66%	3,184	80.34%	—	—	3,963	Republican Hold
36th district	3,112	68.49%	1,432	31.51%	—	—	4,544	Democratic Hold
37th district	—	—	3,863	100.00%	—	—	3,863	Republican Hold
38th district	2,465	56.65%	1,886	43.35%	—	—	4,351	Democratic Gain
39th district	—	—	3,503	100.00%	—	—	3,503	Republican Hold
40th district	2,245	54.77%	1,854	45.23%	—	—	4,099	Democratic Hold
41st district	1,747	63.16%	1,019	36.84%	—	—	2,766	Democratic Hold
42nd district	2,410	65.35%	1,278	34.65%	—	—	3,688	Democratic Hold
43rd district	2,075	43.10%	2,739	56.90%	—	—	4,814	Republican Hold
44th district	1,845	44.59%	2,293	55.41%	—	—	4,138	Republican Hold
45th district	1,053	24.95%	3,168	75.05%	—	—	4,221	Republican Hold
46th district	—	—	5,432	100.00%	—	—	5,432	Republican Hold
47th district	1,752	34.09%	3,388	65.91%	—	—	5,140	Republican Hold
48th district	2,198	52.55%	1,985	47.45%	—	—	4,183	Democratic Hold
49th district	2,279	63.93%	1,286	36.07%	—	—	3,565	Democratic Hold
50th district	1,956	43.41%	2,550	56.59%	—	—	4,506	Republican Hold
51st district	1,984	58.66%	1,398	41.34%	—	—	3,382	Democratic Hold
52nd district	2,580	65.57%	1,355	34.43%	—	—	3,935	Democratic Hold
53rd district	1,590	41.95%	2,200	58.05%	—	—	3,790	Republican Hold
54th district	1,749	51.59%	1,641	48.41%	—	—	3,390	Democratic Hold
55th district	2,308	42.54%	3,118	57.46%	—	—	5,426	Republican Hold
56th district	—	—	3,407	63.01%	2,000	36.99%	5,407	Republican Hold
57th district	2,086	33.59%	4,125	66.41%	—	—	6,211	Republican Hold
58th district	2,319	49.72%	2,345	50.28%	—	—	4,664	Republican Hold
59th district	2,845	55.29%	2,301	44.71%	—	—	5,146	Democratic Gain
60th district	2,397	47.64%	2,635	52.36%	—	—	5,032	Republican Hold
61st district	—	—	3,438	100.00%	—	—	3,438	Republican Hold
62nd district	2,821	60.19%	1,866	39.81%	—	—	4,687	Democratic Hold
63rd district	3,457	51.67%	3,233	48.33%	—	—	6,690	Democratic Hold
64th district	3,523	58.74%	2,475	41.26%	—	—	5,998	Democratic Hold
65th district	2,362	65.25%	1,258	34.75%	—	—	3,620	Democratic Hold
66th district	3,423	68.04%	1,608	31.96%	—	—	5,031	Democratic Hold
67th district	2,164	35.34%	3,960	64.66%	—	—	6,124	Republican Hold
68th district	1,666	38.65%	2,644	61.35%	—	—	4,310	Republican Hold
69th district	1,811	27.64%	4,740	72.36%	—	—	6,551	Republican Hold
70th district	2,784	44.63%	3,454	55.37%	—	—	6,238	Republican Hold
71st district	2,748	46.61%	3,148	53.39%	—	—	5,896	Republican Hold
72nd district	1,124	24.39%	3,485	75.61%	—	—	4,609	Republican Hold
73rd district	3,503	100.00%	—	—	—	—	3,503	Democratic Hold
74th district	4,079	100.00%	—	—	—	—	4,079	Democratic Hold
75th district	3,491	100.00%	—	—	—	—	3,491	Democratic Hold
76th district	2,893	100.00%	—	—	—	—	2,893	Democratic Hold
77th district	2,155	38.77%	3,403	61.23%	—	—	5,558	Republican Hold
78th district	2,380	55.35%	1,920	44.65%	—	—	4,300	Democratic Hold
79th district	2,822	57.24%	1,879	38.11%	229	4.65%	4,930	Democratic Hold
80th district	3,038	61.27%	1,920	38.73%	—	—	4,958	Democratic Hold
81st district	2,870	69.78%	1,243	30.22%	—	—	4,113	Democratic Hold
82nd district	3,115	64.43%	1,720	35.57%	—	—	4,835	Democratic Hold
83rd district	1,350	30.21%	3,118	69.79%	—	—	4,468	Republican Hold
84th district	1,750	38.89%	2,567	57.04%	183	4.07%	4,500	Republican Hold
85th district	2,020	61.44%	1,268	38.56%	—	—	3,288	Democratic Hold
86th district	3,931	100.00%	—	—	—	—	3,931	Democratic Hold
87th district	1,858	34.41%	3,541	65.59%	—	—	5,399	Republican Hold
88th district	2,357	48.67%	2,486	51.33%	—	—	4,843	Republican Hold
89th district	—	—	4,624	100.00%	—	—	4,624	Republican Hold
90th district	2,128	40.46%	3,131	59.54%	—	—	5,259	Republican Hold
91st district	2,828	62.18%	1,720	37.82%	—	—	4,548	Democratic Hold
92nd district	3,755	67.90%	1,775	32.10%	—	—	5,530	Democratic Hold
93rd district	4,003	68.60%	1,832	31.40%	—	—	5,835	Democratic Hold
94th district	3,033	56.66%	2,320	43.34%	—	—	5,353	Democratic Hold
95th district	3,144	64.77%	1,710	35.23%	—	—	4,854	Democratic Hold
96th district	2,720	60.48%	1,777	39.52%	—	—	4,497	Democratic Hold
97th district	3,693	70.32%	1,559	29.68%	—	—	5,252	Democratic Hold
98th district	3,285	56.12%	2,569	43.88%	—	—	5,854	Democratic Hold
99th district	4,026	72.70%	1,512	27.30%	—	—	5,538	Democratic Hold
100th district	2,252	49.14%	2,331	50.86%	—	—	4,583	Republican Hold
Total	221,080	48.87%	227,019	50.18%	4,274	0.94%	452,373	
