= 1970 Alabama House of Representatives election =

- November 3, 1970

All 106 seats in the Alabama House of Representatives 54 seats needed for a majority

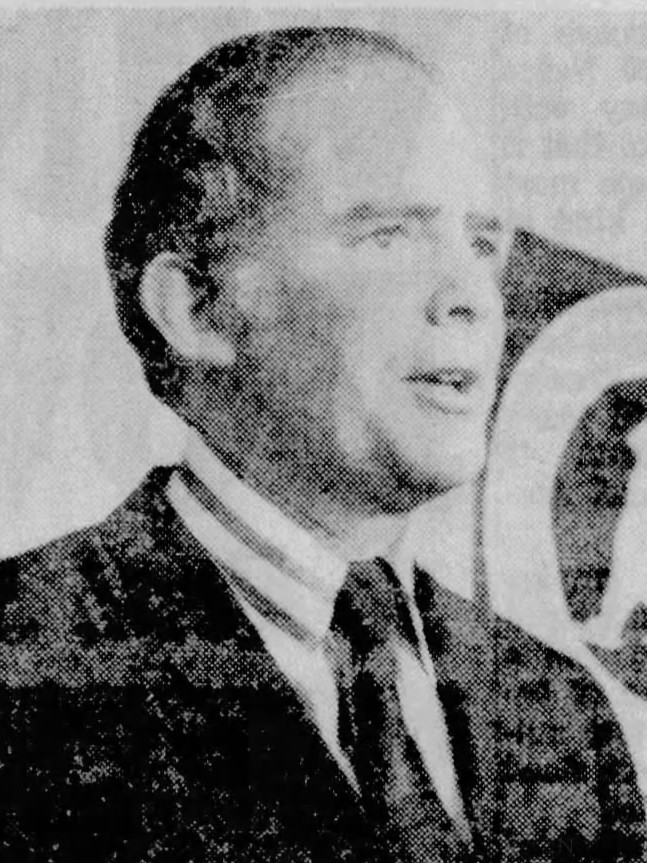

	Majority party	Minority party	Third party
Leader	Rankin Fite (lost re-election as speaker)	Bert Nettles (de facto)	None
Party	Democratic	Republican	NDPA
Leader since	January 10, 1967	April 1, 1969 (sp.)	—
Leader's seat	9th–Marion Co.	37th–Mobile Co. p. 7	—
Last election	106 seats, 66.16%	0 seats, 33.60%	New
Seats before	105	1	0
Seats won	103	2	1
Seat change	▼3	▲2	▲1
Popular vote	2,895,406	787,599	493,081
Percentage	68.57%	18.65%	11.68%
- Democratic hold Republican hold Republican gain National Democratic gain Multi-member districts: Democratic majority Even split Democratic: 40–50% 50–60% 60–70% 70–80% 80–90% 90–100% Unopposed; Republican: 50–60% National Democratic: 50–60%
Speaker before election
Rankin Fite
Democratic
Elected Speaker
G. Sage Lyons
Democratic

The 1970 Alabama House of Representatives election took place on Tuesday, November 3, 1970, to elect 106 representatives to serve four-year terms in the Alabama House of Representatives. Primary elections were held on May 5 with runoff elections on June 2. The first two Black state legislators since the Reconstruction era were elected this year, both from District 31 in Barbour, Bullock, and Macon counties: Thomas Reed in place 1 on the National Democratic Party of Alabama ticket, and Fred Gray in place 2 as a Democrat. Reed would later run under the Democratic banner in the 1974 general election.

Incumbent speaker Rankin Fite lost the confidence of incoming Governor George Wallace, and was replaced as speaker by a unanimous vote at the beginning of the 1971 session. State representative G. Sage Lyons of Mobile County's sixth place was hand-picked by Wallace to succeed Fite and was elected to the post without opposition. Only two Republicans were elected at the general election: Bert Nettles of Mobile County was re-elected, and Doug Hale was elected to Madison County's fifth slot. The two agreed to make the more senior representative, Nettles, the minority leader, with Hale becoming minority whip.

This was the last state house election in Alabama before a 1973 federal court order mandated a new legislative map with single-member districts. At this point, the state had used a mixed system of single-member and multi-member districts to allocate seats in the legislature, all based on pre-existing county lines.

The election took place concurrently with elections for U.S. House, governor, state senate, and numerous other state and local offices.

== Summary ==
Party	Candidates			Seats		
Party	Num.	Vote	%	Last	Won	+/–
Democratic	106	2,895,406	68.57%	106	103	▼3
Republican	38	787,599	18.65%	0	2	▲2
NDPA	43	493,081	11.68%	0	1	▲1
Independent Party	5	41,732	0.99%	0	0	Steady
Conservative	3	4,133	0.10%	0	0	Steady
Independents	1	482	0.01%	0	0	Steady
Write-in	—	26	0.001%	—	0	Steady
Total	196	4,222,459	100%	106	106	Steady

== General election results ==
District	Democratic			Republican			National Democratic			Others			Total		
District	Candidate	Votes	%	Candidate	Votes	%	Candidate	Votes	%	Candidate	Votes	%	Votes	Maj.	Mrg.
3rd p. 1	Hartell B. Lutz	30,604	92.08%	—	—	—	Richard Perkins	2,634	7.92%	—	—	—	33,238	+27,970	+84.16%
3rd p. 3	Bill G. King	29,329	91.30%	—	—	—	Judge Harris	2,795	8.70%	—	—	—	32,124	+26,534	+82.60%
3rd p. 4	Glenn H. Hearn	27,266	83.13%	—	—	—	Myrna Copeland	2,934	8.95%	John Zynowski (Con.)	2,600	7.93%	32,800	+24,332	+74.18%
3rd p. 5	Billy Laxson	16,093	42.22%	Douglas V. Hale	19,678	51.63%	James Hicks	1,721	4.52%	Russell Perry (Con.)	623	1.63%	38,115	−3,585	−9.41%
5th p. 2	Glen A. Reynolds	12,799	75.69%	Frank B. Merkle	4,110	24.31%	—	—	—	—	—	—	16,909	+8,689	+51.39%
6th p. 1	David B. Cauthen	12,078	95.34%	—	—	—	Floyd Lee Jones	590	4.66%	—	—	—	12,668	+11,488	+90.67%
6th p. 2	Ralph E. Slate	11,806	91.36%	—	—	—	Garry Nungester	1,117	8.64%	—	—	—	12,923	+10,689	+82.71%
7th p. 3	Tom Drake	18,596	75.21%	Carl J. Woodard	6,131	24.79%	—	—	—	—	—	—	24,727	+12,465	+50.41%
10th	Ralph Reid	4,949	64.78%	Bruce Phillips	2,639	34.54%	Millard Graves	52	0.68%	—	—	—	7,640	+2,310	+30.24%
12th	Deacon Grey	8,568	94.67%	—	—	—	—	—	—	H. A. Greer (Ind.)	482	5.33%	9,050	+8,086	+89.35%
13th p. 1	Alvis Naramore	13,208	89.36%	Larry Akins	1,573	10.64%	—	—	—	—	—	—	14,781	+11,635	+78.72%
14th p. 1	J. Paul Meeks Jr.	80,317	59.20%	James B. Knight Jr.	32,261	23.78%	Lincoln Hendrick	23,100	17.03%	—	—	—	135,678	+48,056	+35.42%
14th p. 2	J. T. Waggoner	83,096	72.14%	Dooley Compton	32,094	27.86%	—	—	—	—	—	—	115,190	+51,002	+44.28%
14th p. 3	Robert L. Ellis	75,592	55.84%	Malcolm Bethea	36,371	26.87%	Calvin Smith	23,399	17.29%	—	—	—	135,362	+39,221	+28.97%
14th p. 4	Ben L. Erdreich	72,617	54.08%	C. Nelson Burkett	28,569	21.28%	James Foy Jr.	22,386	16.67%	Herbert Kilgore (AIP)	10,709	7.98%	134,281	+44,048	+32.80%
14th p. 5	Dick Dill	68,913	51.25%	Bentley Owens	42,210	31.39%	James Armstrong	23,339	17.36%	—	—	—	134,462	+26,703	+19.86%
14th p. 6	Robert D. Timmons	74,272	55.32%	Meade Whitaker	36,001	26.82%	Demetrius Newton	23,979	17.86%	—	—	—	134,252	+38,271	+28.51%
14th p. 7	Bob Adwell	76,791	57.22%	James L. Cox	33,179	24.72%	Thomas Wrenn	24,238	18.06%	—	—	—	134,208	+43,612	+32.48%
14th p. 8	Raymond Weeks	77,975	58.33%	Nick Sfakianos	32,504	24.31%	James A. Easley	23,207	17.36%	—	—	—	133,686	+45,471	+34.01%
14th p. 9	Chriss H. Doss	75,771	57.09%	James A. Price	33,812	25.48%	Samuel Jackson	23,133	17.43%	—	—	—	132,716	+41,959	+31.62%
14th p. 10	Robert C. Gafford	78,804	59.21%	Howard A. Ture	30,851	23.18%	Davis Jordan	23,438	17.61%	—	—	—	133,093	+47,953	+36.03%
14th p. 11	Wade Wallace	77,418	58.37%	O. W. Irwin Jr.	32,981	24.87%	C. H. Johnson	22,230	16.76%	—	—	—	132,629	+44,437	+33.50%
14th p. 12	Drake Boutwell	74,163	55.08%	Jim Holliman	29,096	21.61%	Merulrine Watkins	22,891	17.00%	Don Adams (AIP)	8,484	6.30%	134,634	+45,067	+33.47%
14th p. 13	Francis Falkenburg	69,821	52.48%	Raymond C. Barry	28,644	21.53%	Jonathon McPherson	23,792	17.88%	Tommy Watkins (AIP)	10,784	8.11%	133,041	+41,177	+30.95%
14th p. 14	Horace W. Parker	64,406	47.88%	Lynn Strickland Jr.	38,971	28.97%	Ralph M. Galt	23,220	17.26%	Verbon E. Crane (AIP)	7,932	5.90%	134,529	+25,435	+18.91%
14th p. 15	Quinton R. Bowers	82,213	73.89%	Robert A. Thomason III	29,048	26.11%	—	—	—	—	—	—	111,261	+53,165	+47.78%
14th p. 16	Richard L. McBride	81,997	61.61%	Davis Hunt Thompson	28,042	21.07%	Jolene Lasater	23,043	17.31%	—	—	—	133,082	+53,955	+40.54%
14th p. 17	J. Earl Jones	77,887	58.77%	Richard W. Ellis	31,437	23.72%	Hasty Kim Yow	23,215	17.52%	—	—	—	132,539	+46,450	+35.05%
14th p. 18	Bennett L. Cherner	93,553	79.87%	—	—	—	Dave Conley	23,573	20.13%	—	—	—	117,126	+69,980	+59.75%
14th p. 20	Hugh Boles	78,396	59.30%	Doug Shockley	30,646	23.18%	Leavy Oliver	23,170	17.52%	—	—	—	132,212	+47,750	+36.12%
15th	Doc Coshatt	4,824	65.69%	Barnett Lawley	2,199	29.94%	O. W. Green	321	4.37%	—	—	—	7,344	+2,625	+35.74%
16th p. 1	Ray Burgess	14,564	76.54%	Elvin McCary	4,464	23.46%	—	—	—	—	—	—	19,028	+10,100	+53.08%
16th p. 2	Hugh D. Merill	14,793	78.77%	Pay Wayne Shaddix	3,986	21.23%	—	—	—	—	—	—	18,779	+10,807	+57.54%
17th	William H. Lang	6,377	64.25%	—	—	—	Woodson D. Lewis	3,549	35.75%	—	—	—	9,926	+2,828	+28.50%
18th p. 2	Edward D. Robertson	18,325	85.17%	—	—	—	Gene Newson	3,190	14.83%	—	—	—	21,515	+15,135	+70.34%
18th p. 3	Tim Parker	18,753	86.72%	—	—	—	Joe N. Ross	2,873	13.28%	—	—	—	21,626	+15,880	+73.44%
18th p. 4	Bert Bank	18,691	86.01%	—	—	—	Ruth Cummings	3,041	13.99%	—	—	—	21,732	+15,650	+72.02%
19th	Tom Stubbs	6,286	77.25%	Lewis B. Walker	1,851	22.75%	—	—	—	—	—	—	8,137	+4,435	+54.50%
20th p. 2	Philip H. Smith	11,274	79.23%	Roy McCaig	2,953	20.75%	—	—	—	Write-in	2	0.01%	14,229	+8,321	+58.48%
27th p. 1	Ira D. Pruitt	12,108	57.96%	—	—	—	Robert Scott	8,784	42.04%	—	—	—	20,892	+3,324	+15.92%
27th p. 2	Rick Manley	12,142	57.58%	—	—	—	F. N. Nixon	8,942	42.41%	Write-in	3	0.01%	21,087	+3,200	+15.17%
28th p. 1	Cot Cottingham	6,807	61.15%	Jean Sullivan	3,546	31.85%	Anna Taylor	779	7.00%	—	—	—	11,132	+3,261	+29.30%
28th p. 2	W. Milam Turner Jr.	9,466	68.88%	—	—	—	Joe R. Johnson	4,277	31.12%	—	—	—	13,743	+5,189	+37.76%
29th	William D. Edwards	4,999	48.75%	Joan Pate	2,505	24.43%	Robert Strickland	2,751	26.83%	—	—	—	10,255	+2,248	+21.92%
31st p. 1	James L. Paulk	8,624	47.75%	—	—	—	Thomas Reed	9,436	52.25%	—	—	—	18,060	+812	+4.50%
31st p. 2	Fred Gray	9,938	53.18%	Russell L. Irby	8,748	46.82%	—	—	—	—	—	—	18,686	+1,190	+6.36%
32nd p. 1	Bowen Brassell	11,149	87.21%	—	—	—	Carlton Mabry	1,635	12.79%	—	—	—	12,784	+9,514	+74.42%
32nd p. 3	Charles H. Adams	10,907	86.54%	—	—	—	Lillie M. Cannon	1,696	13.46%	—	—	—	12,603	+9,211	+73.08%
33rd p. 2	Joe McCorquodale	13,488	92.14%	—	—	—	Curtis Goode	1,151	7.86%	—	—	—	14,639	+12,337	+84.28%
34th p. 1	Maston Mims	10,199	76.99%	—	—	—	H. B. Williams	3,049	23.01%	—	—	—	13,248	+7,150	+53.98%
35th p. 1	Sam W. Taylor	21,692	54.58%	Wayne Collett	10,209	25.69%	Charles Spears	7,840	19.73%	—	—	—	39,741	+11,483	+28.89%
35th p. 2	James D. Harris Jr.	20,423	50.85%	Buddy Brendle	11,338	28.23%	Larry Williams	7,492	18.65%	Charles Muncaster (Con.)	910	2.27%	40,163	+9,085	+22.62%
35th p. 3	Walker Hobbie Jr.	20,563	51.15%	Mark Anderson	12,112	30.13%	Simuel Sippial	7,529	18.73%	—	—	—	40,204	+8,451	+21.02%
35th p. 4	Fred R. Jones	20,913	51.25%	Fred Hooper	12,341	30.24%	E. D. Nixon	7,550	18.50%	—	—	—	40,804	+8,572	+21.01%
37th p. 7	Dan Alexander	28,615	45.43%	Bert Nettles	34,378	54.57%	—	—	—	—	—	—	62,993	−5,763	−9.14%
37th p. 8	Maurice A. Downing	30,908	51.91%	Reggie Copeland	28,634	48.09%	—	—	—	—	—	—	59,542	+2,274	+3.82%
37th p. 9	Monty Collins	32,198	53.95%	Victor Gaston	27,487	46.05%	—	—	—	—	—	—	59,685	+4,711	+7.90%
39th	Philip T. May	5,416	58.62%	—	—	—	—	—	—	W. Malcolm Edwards (AIP)	3,823	41.38%	9,239	+1,593	+17.24%

== Democratic primary results ==
Eight Black Americans sought nominations from the Democratic Party in the 1970 state house elections. Only one, Fred Gray, won their Democratic primary.

- District 14 (Jefferson)
  - Place 7: J. Mason Davis lost the first round of the Democratic primary to incumbent representative Bob Adwell.
  - Place 17: Wilson Fallin Jr. was defeated by J. Earl Jones in the Democratic runoff.
  - Place 20: Photographer Chris McNair was defeated by Hugh Boles in the Democratic runoff.
- District 27 (Marengo–Perry–Sumter): Alabama Democratic Conference chairman Joe L. Reed was defeated by incumbent representative Ira Pruitt in the Democratic runoff.
- District 28 (Dallas)
  - Place 1: Businessman Edwin Moss was defeated by incumbent representative Paul Cottingham in the Democratic runoff.
  - Place 2: Radio personality Marius J. Anderson was defeated by incumbent representative Milam Turner in the Democratic runoff.
- District 31 (Barbour–Bullock–Macon)
  - Place 1: Civil rights leader Thomas Reed lost the first round of the Democratic primary to incumbent representative James L. Paulk, and subsequently won the general election as a candidate of the NDPA.
  - Place 2: Attorney Fred Gray, candidate for the legislature in 1966, defeated incumbent representative Bill Nevile in the first round of the Democratic primary and won the subsequent general election.

=== Runoff results by district ===
Candidates in boldface advanced to the general election. An asterisk (*) denotes a runoff winner who was the runner-up in the first round.

District	Winner			Loser			Total		
District	Candidate	Votes	%	Candidate	Votes	%	Votes	Maj.	Mrg.
1st p. 1	Ronnie Flippo	10,070	54.13%	Donald Wallace Jr.	8,533	45.87%	18,603	+1,537	+8.26%
2nd p. 2	Wayland Cross	5,670	58.14%	Paul Johnson	4,083	41.86%	9,753	+1,587	+16.27%
3rd p. 1	Hartwell Lutz	28,453	63.45%	Tom Jones	16,387	36.55%	44,840	+12,066	+26.91%
3rd p. 3	Bill G. King	24,935	59.03%	David Culver	17,307	40.97%	42,242	+7,628	+18.06%
5th p. 2	Glen Reynolds	11,808	55.31%	W. A. Berryman (inc.)	9,539	44.69%	21,347	+2,269	+10.63%
7th p. 1	Finis St. John	17,500	55.24%	Hinton Mitchem	14,181	44.76%	31,681	+3,319	+10.48%
10th	Ralph Reid	5,507	63.90%	Bill Lemley	3,111	36.10%	8,618	+2,396	+27.80%
11th p. 1	W. Waldrop	16,661	58.97%	Robert Echols	11,591	41.03%	28,252	+5,070	+17.95%
11th p. 3	R. D. Wynot	18,704	65.85%	W. E. Owens Jr. (inc.)	9,700	34.15%	28,404	+9,004	+31.70%
12th	D. C. Grey	6,920	52.38%	Max Newman	6,290	47.62%	13,210	+630	+4.77%
13th p. 1	Alvis Naramore	11,704	54.29%	Alonzo Shumate (inc.)	9,855	45.71%	21,559	+1,849	+8.58%
13th p. 2	Robert T. Crowe	13,520	63.29%	Oscar Dobbs (inc.)	7,842	36.71%	21,362	+5,678	+26.58%
14th p. 3	Bob Eillis (inc.)	79,015	50.73%	Ed Randle	76,750	49.27%	155,765	+2,265	+1.45%
14th p. 6	Robert Timmons	82,384	55.24%	Harold Ackerman	66,742	44.76%	149,126	+15,642	+10.49%
14th p. 9	Chris Doss	97,176	60.70%	Tommy Watkins (inc.)	62,910	39.30%	160,086	+34,266	+21.40%
14th p. 11	Wade Wallace	86,566	53.88%	Travis Tidwell	74,097	46.12%	160,663	+12,469	+7.76%
14th p. 12	Drake Boutwell	98,373	62.76%	J. W. Patmon	58,366	37.24%	156,739	+40,007	+25.52%
14th p. 14	Horace Parker	79,210	52.07%	Bedford Seale	72,898	47.93%	152,108	+6,312	+4.15%
14th p. 16	Richard McBride	114,396	75.65%	George Spencer	36,830	24.35%	151,226	+77,566	+51.29%
14th p. 17	J. Earl Jones	100,578	63.91%	Wilson Fallin Jr.	56,785	36.09%	157,363	+43,793	+27.83%
14th p. 20	Hugh Boles	94,755	54.23%	Chris McNair	79,967	45.77%	174,722	+14,788	+8.46%
16th p. 1	Ray Burgess (inc.)	13,976	51.69%	Kenneth Griffith	13,064	48.31%	27,040	+912	+3.37%
17th	William Lang	5,312	52.19%	B. G. Robison Jr.	4,867	47.81%	10,179	+445	+4.37%
18th p. 1	John Culver (inc.)	14,723	53.27%	Temo Callahan	12,917	46.73%	27,640	+1,806	+6.53%
18th p. 3	Tim Parker	16,742	58.96%	Ralph Brown (inc.)	11,653	41.04%	28,395	+5,089	+17.92%
20th p. 1	Murray McCluskey	9,741	51.14%	Frank Clayton	9,306	48.86%	19,047	+435	+2.28%
25th	Kirby Smith	9,026	73.90%	J. C. Henderson	3,187	26.10%	12,213	+5,839	+47.81%
26th	Charles Snell (inc.)	5,551	50.60%	Shafford Leasley	5,420	49.40%	10,971	+131	+1.19%
27th	Ira Pruitt (inc.)	8,197	53.96%	Joe Reed	6,993	46.04%	15,190	+1,204	+7.93%
28th p. 1	Paul Cottingham	9,622	55.69%	Edwin Moss	7,656	44.31%	17,278	+1,966	+11.38%
28th p. 2	Milam Turner	10,050	58.65%	Marius Anderson	7,086	41.35%	17,136	+2,964	+17.30%
30th	H. H. O'Daniel	5,896	52.26%	Earnest Collier (inc.)	5,385	47.74%	11,281	+511	+4.53%
31st p. 2	Fred Gray	10,842	51.28%	Bill Neville (inc.)	10,300	48.72%	21,142	+542	+2.56%
34th p. 2	J. E. Warren	6,821	79.61%	W. P. Albritton	1,747	20.39%	8,568	+5,074	+59.22%
35th p. 1	Sam Taylor	23,541	56.30%	Harold Harris (inc.)	18,276	43.70%	41,817	+5,265	+12.59%
35th p. 2	James Harris	21,526	51.62%	Jere Harbin	20,172	48.38%	41,698	+1,354	+3.25%
35th p. 4	Fred Jones	25,953	61.29%	Howard McElhaney (inc.)	16,390	38.71%	42,343	+9,563	+22.58%
35th p. 5	Jim Straiton	28,115	65.06%	Curtis Springer (inc.)	15,100	34.94%	43,215	+13,015	+30.12%
36th p. 2	Gene Hardin (inc.)	7,744	56.42%	Henry Wyatt	5,981	43.58%	13,725	+1,763	+12.85%
38th p. 1	Daniel Kinsey	11,116	69.13%	Wilson Hayes	4,965	30.87%	16,081	+6,151	+38.25%
38th p. 2	Thomas Benton	8,721	53.53%	Ernest Bailey	7,572	46.47%	16,293	+1,149	+7.05%
39th	Philip E. May	5,546	50.07%	Malcolm Edwards	5,531	49.93%	11,077	+15	+0.14%
40th p. 2	Harold Wise	10,459	53.81%	J. A. Hughes	8,978	46.19%	19,437	+1,481	+7.62%
41st	G. C. Donaldson Jr.	4,661	50.10%	Douglas Easter	4,642	49.90%	9,303	+19	+0.20%
Source: The Huntsville Times

== 1967–1970 special elections ==
Contest	County(ies)	Date	Incumbent	Winner	Result	Cause
18th p. 2	Tuscaloosa	Nov. 7, 1967	Hugh Thomas (D)	Edward Robertson (D)	Dem hold.	Incumbent representative died in a traffic collision on April 25, 1967.
3rd p. 2	Madison	Nov. 5, 1968	John D. Snodgrass (D)	Charles Grainger (D)	Dem hold.	Incumbent representative appointed to a circuit judgeship in Madison County on August 7, 1968.
37th p. 6	Mobile	Apr. 1, 1969	Coy Smith (D)	G. Sage Lyons (D)	Dem hold.	Incumbent representative resigned in January 1969 after being elected to the Mobile County Commission.
37th p. 7	Mobile	Apr. 1, 1969	Elwood Hogan (D)	Bert Nettles (R)	Rep GAIN.	Incumbent representative appointed special judge on the Mobile County Court of General Sessions on October 3, 1967. First Republican elected to the legislature from Mobile County since the Reconstruction era.
2nd p. 2	Lawrence–Limestone	Dec. 9, 1969 (Note: Acclaimed on October 10; special election not held.)	Robert Berryman (D)	Kylie T. Berryman (D)	Dem hold.	Incumbent representative died of a heart attack on July 9, 1969. Second woman to ever serve in the state legislature. See widow's succession.

=== District 18 place 2 (Tuscaloosa County) ===
November 7, 1967 district 18 place 2 special election Death of Hugh Thomas
Party	Candidate	Votes	%	±%
Democratic	Edward Robertson	3,831	56.32%	−43.68%
Republican	H. H. Sullivan	2,971	43.68%	New
Total votes		6,802	100.00%	
Democratic hold				

=== District 3 place 2 (Madison County) ===
November 5, 1968 district 3 place 2 special election Resignation of John D. Snodgrass
Party	Candidate	Votes	%	±%
Democratic	Milton K. Cummings	27,882	57.18%	−4.74%
Republican	Jack Hay	15,905	32.62%	−5.46%
NDPA	Myrna Copeland	3,943	8.09%	New
American Independent	Bud Abbott	1,031	2.11%	New
Total votes		48,761	100.00%	
Democratic hold				

=== District 37 place 6 (Mobile County) ===
April 1, 1969 district 37 place 6 special election Resignation of Coy Smith
Party	Candidate	Votes	%	±%
Democratic	G. Sage Lyons	24,631	74.90%	+9.38%
Independent	Clarence H. Montgomery	8,255	25.10%	New
Total votes		34,271	100.00%	
Democratic hold				

=== District 37 place 7 (Mobile County) ===
April 1, 1969 district 37 place 7 special election Resignation of Elwood Hogan
Party	Candidate	Votes	%	±%
Republican	Bert Nettles	18,917	55.20%	+28.41%
Independent	Charles H. Bell III	7,344	21.43%	New
Democratic	Harry P. Clark	5,301	15.47%	−57.74%
Independent	W. B. Westbrook	2,709	7.90%	New
Total votes		34,271	100.00%	
Republican gain from Democratic				

=== District 2 place 2 (Lawrence–Limestone) ===
December 9, 1969 district 2 place 2 special election Death of Robert Berryman
Party	Candidate	Votes	%	±%
Democratic	Kylie T. Berryman	Unopposed		
Democratic hold				

== See also ==
- Category:1970 elections in Alabama
  - 1970 United States House of Representatives elections in Alabama
  - 1970 Alabama gubernatorial election
  - 1970 Alabama Senate election
- 1970 United States elections
