= 1972 United States Senate election in Alabama =

- November 7, 1972
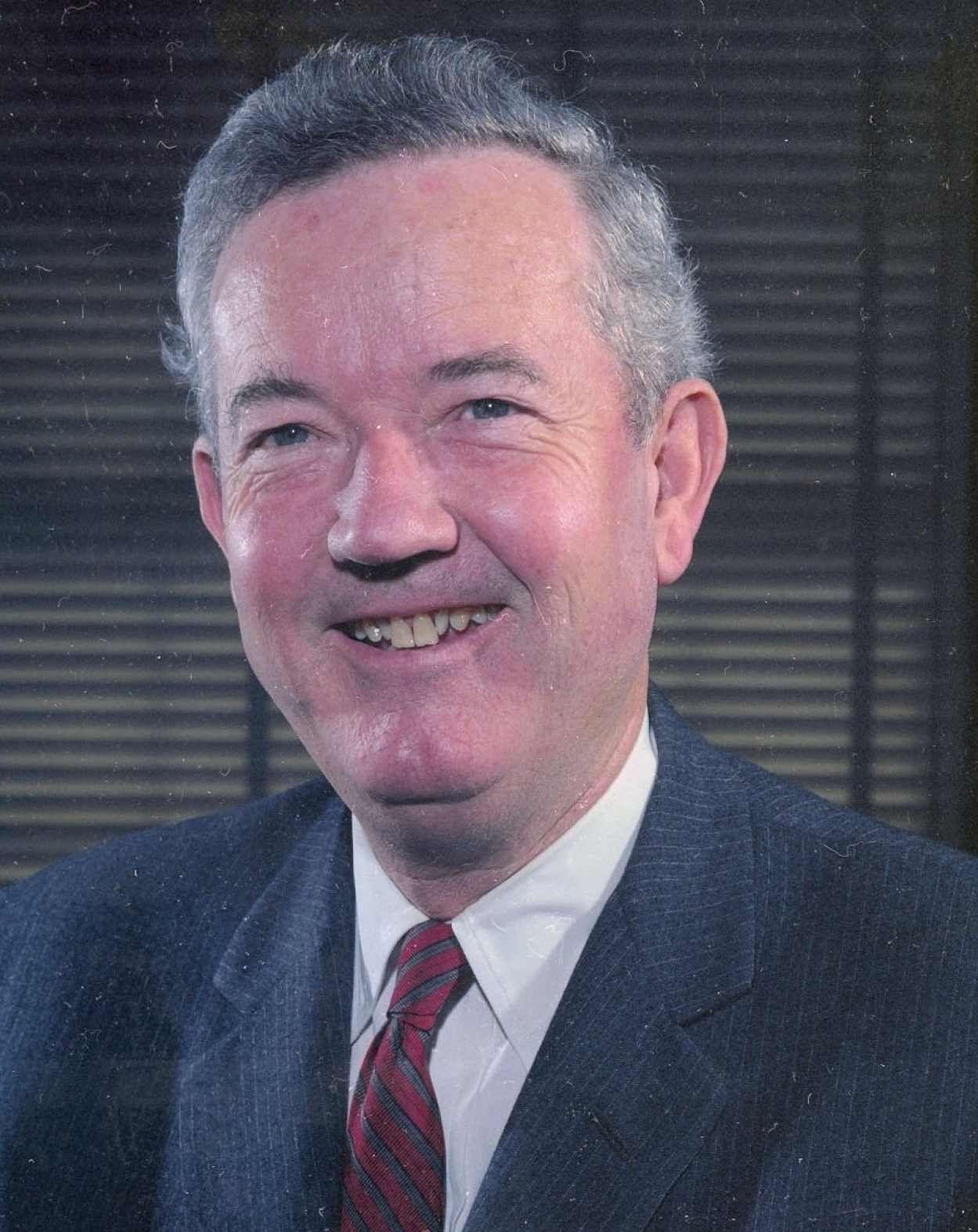

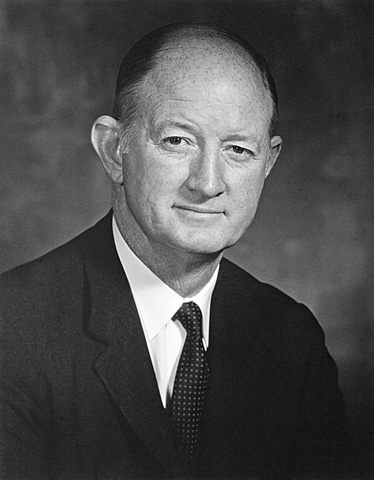
Nominee	John Sparkman	Winton Blount
Party	Democratic	Republican
Popular vote	654,491	347,523
Percentage	62.27%	33.06%
- County results Sparkman: 40–50% 50–60% 60–70% 70–80% Blount: 50–60% LeFlore: 40–50% 60–70%
U.S. senator before election
John Sparkman
Democratic
Elected U.S. Senator
John Sparkman
Democratic

Democratic primary results by county Sparkman: 30–40%; 40–50%; 50–60%; 60–70%; 70–80%; Allen: 30–40%; 40–50%

The 1972 United States Senate election in Alabama was held on November 7, 1972.

Incumbent Senator John Sparkman was re-elected to a fifth full term in office over Postmaster General Winton Blount. Alabama was one of fifteen states, alongside Arkansas, Colorado, Delaware, Georgia, Iowa, Louisiana, Maine, Minnesota, Mississippi, Montana, New Hampshire, Rhode Island, South Dakota and West Virginia, won by Republican President Richard Nixon in 1972 that elected Democrats to the United States Senate.

== Democratic primary ==
=== Candidates ===
- Melba Till Allen, Alabama state auditor
- Sam Chestnut, Jr.
- Robert Edington, state representative
- Jimmy Harper
- Lambert C. Mims, Mobile city commissioner
- John Sparkman, incumbent senator
- Charles Sullins

=== Results ===
1972 Democratic U.S. Senate primary
Party	Candidate	Votes	%
Democratic	John Sparkman (incumbent)	331,838	50.25
Democratic	Melba Till Allen	194,690	29.48
Democratic	Lambert C. Mims	87,461	13.25
Democratic	Robert Edington	22,145	3.35
Democratic	Charles Sullins	12,164	1.84
Democratic	Jimmy Harper	7,523	1.14
Democratic	Sam Chestnut Jr.	4,519	0.68
Total votes		660,340	100.00

== Republican primary ==
=== Candidates ===
- Winton Blount, postmaster general of the United States
- Doris B. Callahan
- James D. Martin, former U.S. representative from Alabama's 7th congressional district
- Bert Nettles, state representative from Mobile County

=== Results ===
1972 Republican U.S. Senate primary
Party	Candidate	Votes	%
Republican	Winton Blount	27,736	54.16
Republican	James D. Martin	16,800	32.81
Republican	Bert Nettles	5,765	11.26
Republican	Doris Callahan	909	1.78
Total votes		51,210	100.00

== Independents and third parties ==
=== Alabama Conservative ===
- Herbert W. Stone

=== Alabama National Democratic ===
- John L. LeFlore, founder of Alabama NAACP and civil rights activist

=== Prohibition ===
- Jerome B. Couch, nominee for governor in 1970

== General election ==
=== Results ===
1972 United States Senate election in Alabama
Party	Candidate	Votes	%	±%
Democratic	John Sparkman (incumbent)	654,491	62.27	▲2.20
Republican	Winton Blount	347,523	33.06	▼5.94
National Democratic Party of Alabama	John L. LeFlore	31,421	2.99	N/A
Prohibition	Jerome Couch	10,826	1.03	N/A
Conservative	Herbert W. Stone	6,838	0.65	N/A
Total votes		1,051,099	100.00	

== Results by county ==
1972 United States Senate election in Alabama by county
County	John Jackson Sparkman Democratic		Winton M. Blount junior Republican		John L. LeFlore National Democratic		Jerome B. Couch Prohibition		Herbert W. Stone Alabama Conservative		Margin		Total votes cast
County	#	%	#	%	#	%	#	%	#	%	#	%	Total votes cast
Autauga	4,949	64.70%	2,455	32.10%	48	0.63%	127	1.66%	70	0.92%	2,494	32.61%	7,649
Baldwin	10,477	55.62%	7,766	41.23%	248	1.32%	243	1.29%	103	0.55%	2,711	14.39%	18,837
Barbour	5,119	69.48%	1,974	26.79%	63	0.86%	163	2.21%	49	0.67%	3,145	42.68%	7,368
Bibb	2,987	69.72%	1,243	29.01%	23	0.54%	1	0.02%	30	0.70%	1,744	40.71%	4,284
Blount	5,336	60.40%	3,433	38.86%	14	0.16%	26	0.29%	26	0.29%	1,903	21.54%	8,835
Bullock	2,155	43.99%	876	17.88%	1,785	36.44%	60	1.22%	23	0.47%	370 (Note: In this county where Blount ran third behind Sparkman and LeFlore, margin given is Sparkman vote minus LeFlore vote and percentage margin Sparkman percentage minus LeFlore percentage.)	7.55%	4,899
Butler	4,320	65.11%	2,275	34.29%	22	0.33%	5	0.08%	13	0.20%	2,045	30.82%	6,635
Calhoun	17,338	63.07%	9,528	34.66%	359	1.31%	77	0.28%	187	0.68%	7,810	28.41%	27,489
Chambers	6,804	59.80%	4,310	37.88%	64	0.56%	139	1.22%	60	0.53%	2,494	21.92%	11,377
Cherokee	3,299	73.10%	1,133	25.11%	25	0.55%	39	0.86%	17	0.38%	2,166	47.99%	4,513
Chilton	5,396	57.71%	3,833	40.99%	62	0.66%	15	0.16%	44	0.47%	1,563	16.72%	9,350
Choctaw	3,642	69.13%	1,362	25.85%	247	4.69%	3	0.06%	14	0.27%	2,280	43.28%	5,268
Clarke	5,237	67.35%	2,282	29.35%	76	0.98%	139	1.79%	42	0.54%	2,955	38.00%	7,776
Clay	2,752	59.02%	1,887	40.47%	10	0.21%	5	0.11%	9	0.19%	865	18.55%	4,663
Cleburne	2,356	57.73%	1,709	41.88%	7	0.17%	4	0.10%	5	0.12%	647	15.85%	4,081
Coffee	8,065	69.18%	3,457	29.65%	42	0.36%	70	0.60%	24	0.21%	4,608	39.53%	11,658
Colbert	12,732	71.32%	4,221	23.64%	536	3.00%	178	1.00%	185	1.04%	8,511	47.68%	17,852
Conecuh	3,567	73.09%	1,238	25.37%	38	0.78%	13	0.27%	24	0.49%	2,329	47.73%	4,880
Coosa	2,429	67.27%	1,171	32.43%	6	0.17%	5	0.14%	0	0.00%	1,258	34.84%	3,611
Covington	7,302	63.73%	4,103	35.81%	25	0.22%	6	0.05%	22	0.19%	3,199	27.92%	11,458
Crenshaw	3,305	70.74%	1,189	25.45%	79	1.69%	85	1.82%	14	0.30%	2,116	45.29%	4,672
Cullman	12,009	61.02%	7,601	38.62%	17	0.09%	28	0.14%	27	0.14%	4,408	22.40%	19,682
Dale	6,500	62.50%	3,739	35.95%	33	0.32%	95	0.91%	33	0.32%	2,761	26.55%	10,400
Dallas	9,295	63.99%	4,858	33.44%	293	2.02%	6	0.04%	74	0.51%	4,437	30.55%	14,526
DeKalb	7,309	52.23%	6,632	47.39%	24	0.17%	15	0.11%	14	0.10%	677	4.84%	13,994
Elmore	6,873	62.26%	3,859	34.95%	41	0.37%	194	1.76%	73	0.66%	3,014	27.30%	11,040
Escambia	7,058	70.39%	2,842	28.34%	68	0.68%	14	0.14%	45	0.45%	4,216	42.05%	10,027
Etowah	19,265	65.33%	9,648	32.72%	313	1.06%	91	0.31%	170	0.58%	9,617	32.61%	29,487
Fayette	3,601	67.16%	1,735	32.36%	6	0.11%	9	0.17%	11	0.21%	1,866	34.80%	5,362
Franklin	4,620	55.04%	3,684	43.89%	48	0.57%	25	0.30%	17	0.20%	936	11.15%	8,394
Geneva	5,037	67.84%	2,328	31.35%	35	0.47%	7	0.09%	18	0.24%	2,709	36.48%	7,425
Greene	1,070	22.18%	643	13.33%	3,054	63.31%	2	0.04%	55	1.14%	-1,984	-41.13%	4,824
Hale	3,102	57.68%	1,038	19.30%	1,012	18.82%	123	2.29%	103	1.92%	2,064	38.38%	5,378
Henry	2,857	64.13%	1,580	35.47%	8	0.18%	5	0.11%	5	0.11%	1,277	28.66%	4,455
Houston	7,349	46.09%	8,118	50.92%	269	1.69%	134	0.84%	74	0.46%	-769	-4.82%	15,944
Jackson	7,794	73.57%	2,574	24.30%	61	0.58%	94	0.89%	71	0.67%	5,220	49.27%	10,594
Jefferson	124,540	61.44%	68,998	34.04%	4,025	1.99%	3,189	1.57%	1,953	0.96%	55,542	27.40%	202,705
Lamar	3,463	77.77%	972	21.83%	10	0.22%	4	0.09%	4	0.09%	2,491	55.94%	4,453
Lauderdale	15,755	71.16%	5,577	25.19%	290	1.31%	329	1.49%	190	0.86%	10,178	45.97%	22,141
Lawrence	4,559	73.17%	1,645	26.40%	16	0.26%	11	0.18%	0	0.00%	2,914	46.77%	6,231
Lee	9,090	57.92%	6,147	39.17%	166	1.06%	217	1.38%	73	0.47%	2,943	18.75%	15,693
Limestone	6,528	70.83%	2,452	26.60%	47	0.51%	140	1.52%	50	0.54%	4,076	44.22%	9,217
Lowndes	2,305	45.84%	881	17.52%	1,692	33.65%	101	2.01%	49	0.97%	613	12.19%	5,028
Macon	5,319	78.60%	978	14.45%	185	2.73%	213	3.15%	72	1.06%	4,341	64.15%	6,767
Madison	36,660	66.79%	16,807	30.62%	680	1.24%	436	0.79%	303	0.55%	19,853	36.17%	54,886
Marengo	5,569	66.19%	1,848	21.96%	868	10.32%	54	0.64%	75	0.89%	3,721	44.22%	8,414
Marion	4,551	63.29%	2,624	36.49%	6	0.08%	6	0.08%	4	0.06%	1,927	26.80%	7,191
Marshall	10,829	63.52%	5,840	34.26%	79	0.46%	211	1.24%	89	0.52%	4,989	29.26%	17,048
Mobile	52,697	58.45%	31,815	35.29%	4,002	4.44%	920	1.02%	721	0.80%	20,882	23.16%	90,155
Monroe	5,137	67.88%	2,147	28.37%	195	2.58%	16	0.21%	73	0.96%	2,990	39.51%	7,568
Montgomery	29,587	58.66%	18,718	37.11%	990	1.96%	821	1.63%	321	0.64%	10,869	21.55%	50,437
Morgan	17,385	67.80%	7,575	29.54%	183	0.71%	378	1.47%	119	0.46%	9,810	38.26%	25,640
Perry	2,769	49.19%	1,117	19.84%	1,713	30.43%	5	0.09%	25	0.44%	1,056	18.76%	5,629
Pickens	3,452	56.63%	1,586	26.02%	1,025	16.81%	6	0.10%	27	0.44%	1,866	30.61%	6,096
Pike	4,883	62.01%	2,777	35.27%	61	0.77%	115	1.46%	38	0.48%	2,106	26.75%	7,874
Randolph	3,688	59.84%	2,317	37.60%	33	0.54%	80	1.30%	45	0.73%	1,371	22.25%	6,163
Russell	5,500	56.85%	3,513	36.31%	181	1.87%	326	3.37%	154	1.59%	1,987	20.54%	9,674
Shelby	7,312	62.24%	4,144	35.27%	53	0.45%	157	1.34%	83	0.71%	3,168	26.96%	11,749
St. Clair	5,255	58.08%	3,474	38.40%	71	0.78%	113	1.25%	135	1.49%	1,781	19.68%	9,048
Sumter	2,614	46.45%	1,072	19.05%	1,901	33.78%	9	0.16%	32	0.57%	713	12.67%	5,628
Talladega	12,398	70.83%	4,942	28.23%	102	0.58%	18	0.10%	45	0.26%	7,456	42.59%	17,505
Tallapoosa	7,465	65.42%	3,654	32.02%	59	0.52%	171	1.50%	62	0.54%	3,811	33.40%	11,411
Tuscaloosa	20,413	65.41%	9,104	29.17%	995	3.19%	493	1.58%	204	0.65%	11,309	36.24%	31,209
Walker	13,171	66.76%	6,447	32.68%	22	0.11%	17	0.09%	72	0.36%	6,724	34.08%	19,729
Washington	3,138	68.62%	1,391	30.42%	29	0.63%	8	0.17%	7	0.15%	1,747	38.20%	4,573
Wilcox	2,270	36.67%	1,174	18.96%	2,679	43.27%	26	0.42%	42	0.68%	-409	-6.61%	6,191
Winston	2,883	45.34%	3,463	54.46%	2	0.03%	7	0.11%	4	0.06%	-580	-9.12%	6,359
Total	654,491	62.27%	347,523	33.06%	31,421	2.99%	10,826	1.03%	6,838	0.65%	306,968	29.20%	1,051,099

== See also ==
- 1972 United States Senate elections
