= 1934 Alabama Senate election =

- November 6, 1934

All 35 seats in the Alabama State Senate 18 seats needed for a majority
	Majority party	Minority party
Leader	R. Holmes Powell (did not stand)	—
Party	Democratic	Republican
Leader since	January 13, 1931	—
Leader's seat	26th–Macon Co.	—
Last election	35 seats, 82.27%	0 seats, 5.97%
Seats won	35	0
Popular vote	149,413	5,353
Percentage	96.54%	3.46%
- Winners by vote share Democratic: 50–60% Unopposed
President pro tempore before election
R. Holmes Powell
Democratic
Elected President pro tempore
D. Hardy Riddle
Democratic

The 1934 Alabama Senate election took place on Tuesday, November 6, 1934, to elect 35 representatives to serve four-year terms in the Alabama Senate. Primary elections were held on June 12 with runoff elections on May 1. The election used the same districts first drawn by the Alabama Constitution of 1901.

Only one Democratic nominee, Webb Chestnut of District 29 (Cherokee–DeKalb County), saw opposition in the general election in Republican James H. Jones.

Democrat D. Hardy Riddle of District 8 (Talladega County) was elected president pro tempore on January 8, 1935 at the legislature's opening session. He won seventeen votes from senators to G. R. Swift's fourteen votes.

The election took place concurrently with elections for U.S. House, governor, state house, and numerous other state and local offices.

== Summary ==
Party	Candidates			Seats		
Party	Num.	Vote	%	Before	Won	+/–
Democratic	35	149,413	96.54%	35	35	Steady
Republican	1	5,353	3.46%	0	0	Steady
Total	36	154,766	100%	35	35	Steady

== General election results ==
=== District 29 (Cherokee–DeKalb) ===
District 29 general election
Party	Candidate	Votes	%
Democratic	Webb Chestnut	7,224	57.44%
Republican	James H. Jones	5,353	42.56%
Total votes		12,577	100.00%

=== Elected without opposition ===
Every candidate elected without an opponent was a Democrat.

- District 1: L. A. Weaver received 3,133 votes.
- District 2: Vernon L. St. John received 3,889 votes.
- District 3: F. G. Stephens received 6,630 votes.
- District 4: Shelby S. Fletcher received 2,777 votes.
- District 5: I. J. Browder received 6,142 votes.
- District 6: W. T. Starnes received 6,136 votes.
- District 7: Max Wellborn received 2,066 votes.
- District 8: D. Hardy Riddle received 2,076 votes.
- District 9: Will O. Walton received 3,945 votes.
- District 10: W. Carvel Woodall received 4,560 votes.
- District 11: Hayse Tucker received 2,430 votes.
- District 12: Walter S. McNeil received 8,641 votes.
- District 13: James A. Simpson received 19,479 votes.
- District 14: John A. Rogers received 1,749 votes.
- District 15: Earle Thomas received 6,502 votes.
- District 16: R. L. Goldsmith received 878 votes.
- District 17: J. L. Kelly received 4,853 votes.
- District 18: Judson C. Locke received 1,932 votes.
- District 19: H. L. Glover received 3,414 votes.
- District 20: O. D. Carlton received 1,184 votes.
- District 21: G. R. Swift received 5,297 votes.
- District 22: J. M. Bonner received 1,018 votes.
- District 23: W. A. Parrish received 2,842 votes.
- District 24: A. M. McDowell received 1,281 votes.
- District 25: Thomas J. Thrower received 4,151 votes.
- District 26: Thomas S. Frazer received 1,392 votes.
- District 27: Isham J. Dorsey received 2,063 votes.
- District 28: Floyd Mooneyham received 6,219 votes.
- District 30: Edgar P. Russell received 1,382 votes.
- District 31: W. B. Mixon received 7,439 votes.
- District 32: H. A. Taylor received 1,616 votes.
- District 33: C. M. A. Rogers received 5,788 votes.
- District 34: Grady W. Cook received 4,928 votes.
- District 35: D. A. Walden received 4,357 votes.

== See also ==
- Category:1934 elections in Alabama
  - 1934 United States House of Representatives elections in Alabama
  - 1934 Alabama gubernatorial election
- 1934 United States elections
