= 1902 Alabama House of Representatives election =

- November 4, 1902

All 105 seats in the Alabama House of Representatives 54 seats needed for a majority
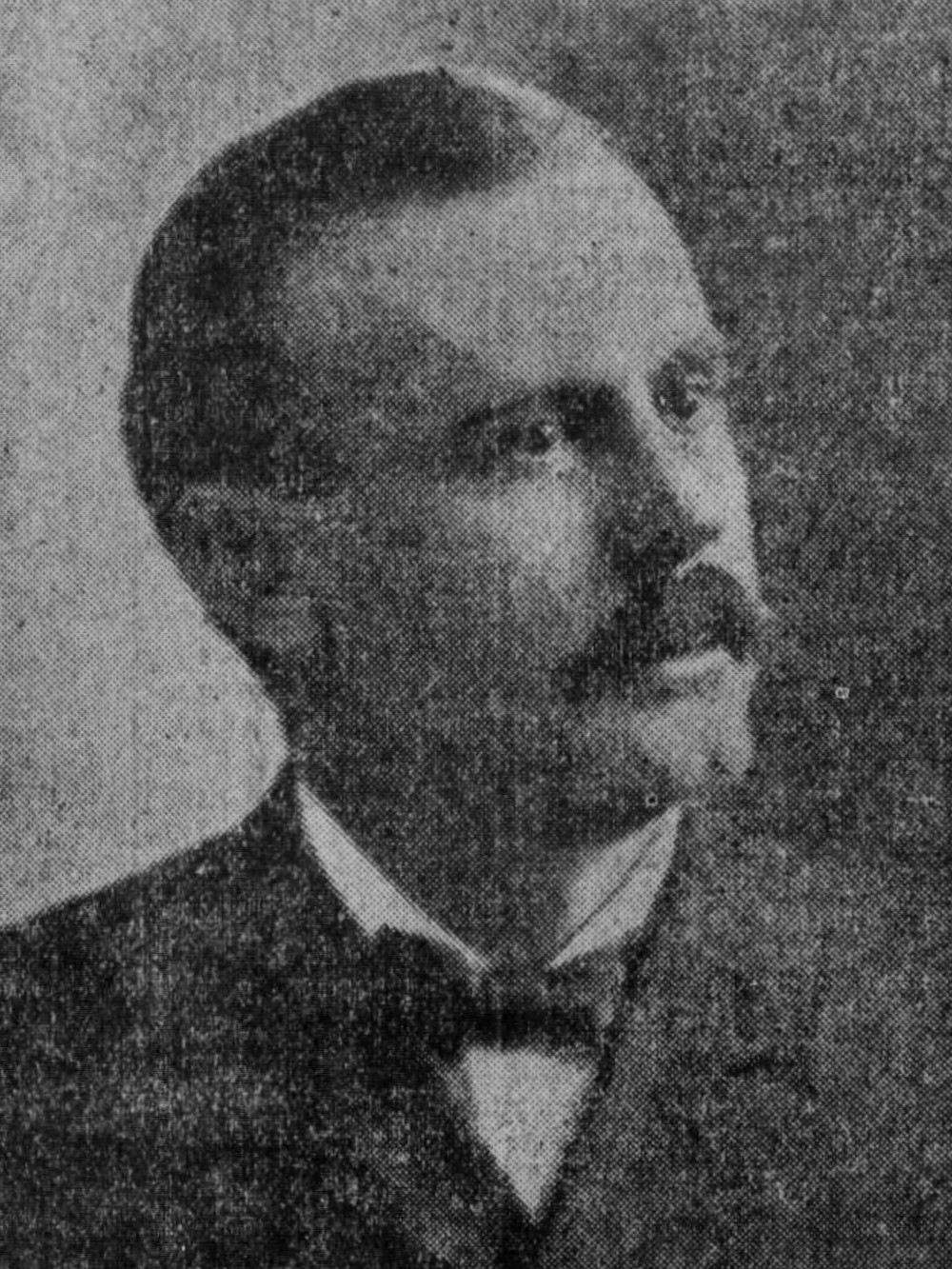

	Majority party	Minority party
Leader	Alfred M. Tunstall	—
Party	Democratic	Republican
Leader since	March 1901	—
Leader's seat	Hale Co.	—
Last election	86 seats	5 seats
Seats won	102	2
Seat change	▲16	▼3
	Third party	Fourth party
Party	Populist	Independent
Last election	7 seats	2 seats
Seats won	1	0
Seat change	▼6	▼2
- Results: Democratic gain Democratic hold Republican gain Republican hold Populist gain Black outlined circles denote newly allocated seats.
Speaker before election
Alfred M. Tunstall
Democratic
Elected Speaker
Alfred M. Tunstall
Democratic

The 1902 Alabama House of Representatives election took place on Tuesday, November 4, 1902, to elect 105 representatives to serve four-year terms in the Alabama House of Representatives. This was the first state house election held in Alabama after the ratification of the 1901 Alabama Constitution. The constitution increased the size of the state house from 100 members to 105, allocating an additional seat each to Butler, Elmore, Etowah, Jefferson, and Walker counties.

Of the 105 members elected, 102 were Democrats, two were Republicans, and one was a Populist. The previous legislature elected in 1900 had seven Populists, five Republicans, and two independents. Alfred M. Tunstall was re-elected Speaker of the House on January 14, 1903. Tunstall became speaker in March 1901 following the death of incumbent speaker Francis L. Pettus.

== General election results ==
Counties not listed were won by Democrats in both the 1900 and 1902 elections.

- Butler: Gained a new seat this election. Democrats Henry B. Pillery and George W. Lee were elected. Populist T. H. Crenshaw won the county's sole seat in 1900.
- Cherokee: Democrat William Siglin was elected. Populist Thomas Blair won this seat in 1900.
- Chilton: Republican L. H. Reynolds was elected. Populist L. B. Pounds won this seat in 1900.
- Clay: Democrat W. T. Preston was elected. Populist J. B. Carmichael won this seat in 1900.
- Coosa: Democrat John W. Johnson was elected. Republican J. H. Porter won this seat in 1900.
- Coffee: Democrat W. H. Warren was elected. Independent B. W. Fleming won this seat in 1900.
- Escambia: Democrat N. R. Leigh Jr. was elected. Populist Joseph H. L. Henley won this seat in 1900.
- Fayette: Democrat R. F. Peters was elected. Populist J. S. Hollis won this seat in 1900.
- Franklin: Democrat W. J. James was elected. Republican-Populist J. A. Byars won this seat in 1900.
- Geneva: Populist Mills was elected. Democrat W. J. Keith Sr. won this seat in 1900.
- Lee: Democrats C. R. McCrary and L. R. Wheless were elected. Independent L. C. Jones and Democrat T. L. Kennedy won this seat in 1900.
- Marshall: Democrat John A. Lusk was elected. Populist W. H. Bartlett won this seat in 1900.
- St. Clair : Democrat W. T. Brown was elected. Republican-Populist N. B. Spears won this seat in 1900.
- Shelby : Democrat E. S. Lyman was elected. Republican-Populist G. B. Deans won this seat in 1900.
- Winston: Republican P. H. Newman was elected. Republican-Populist R. M. Rivers won this seat in 1900.

== See also ==
- 1902 elections in Alabama
  - 1902 United States House of Representatives elections in Alabama
  - 1902 Alabama gubernatorial election
- 1902 United States elections
