= Socialist Party of Connecticut =

- Senate leader: None
- House leader: None
- Founded: January 1, 1973
- Headquarters: Westchester Rd. Colchester, CT
- Ideology: Democratic socialism
- National affiliation: Socialist Party USA
- Colors: Red

The Socialist Party of Connecticut (SPCT) is a socialist political party in the U.S. state of Connecticut. Founded as an affiliate of the Socialist Party of America, the party split with the SPA in 1936 and joined the Social Democratic Federation. In 1957, the Social Democratic Federation reunified with the Socialist Party of America. In 1973, the SPA voted to reform and rename itself Social Democrats, USA, which sought to reform the Democratic Party. The current Socialist Party of Connecticut is the state chapter of the Socialist Party USA.

It was reorganized in the 1970s after the formation of the SPUSA by activists who had been members of the Socialist Party of America.

== Activities ==
=== SPA and SDF affiliation ===
Jasper McLevy served as mayor of Bridgeport from 1933 to 1957. Prior to becoming mayor, he had run for office nearly two dozen times. McLevy was a leader in the "Old Guard" faction of the SPA. McLevy successfully lead the SPC in disaffiliation briefly in 1938 and permanently in 1950.

Party member Irving Freese served as the mayor of Norwalk from 1947 to 1951. Freese was re-elected in 1951 on an independent ticket.

=== SPUSA affiliation ===
In 2009, the Socialist Party of Connecticut denounced Barack Obama's troop surge in Afghanistan, claiming that the president was throwing away much needed resources the country needed to get pulled out of the financial crisis. The state affiliate organized a protest in front of the federal building in Hartford.
