= Mike Milburn =

American politician from Montana

51st Speaker of the Montana House of Representatives
- In office January 3, 2011 – January 7, 2013
- Preceded by: Bob Bergren
- Succeeded by: Mark Blasdel

Member of the Montana House of Representatives from the 19th district
- In office January 6, 2003 – January 7, 2013
- Preceded by: Michael Lange
- Succeeded by: Roger Hagan

Personal details
- Born: September 28, 1952 (age 73) Belleville, Illinois
- Party: Republican

Mike Milburn (born September 28, 1952) was the Speaker of the House for the Montana 62nd Legislature. He is a Republican representing Cascade County. He has been elected for House District 19 four times since 2005. He is a primary sponsor for a bill to repeal the Montana medical marijuana law. Milburn serves on the Legislative Administration, Taxation and Rules Committees.

Milburn obtained a bachelor's degree in geology from Montana State University. He served in the US Air Force from 1975 to 1982 and the National Guard from 1982 to 1998.
