= 1934 Alabama House of Representatives election =

- November 6, 1934

All 106 seats in the Alabama House of Representatives 54 seats needed for a majority
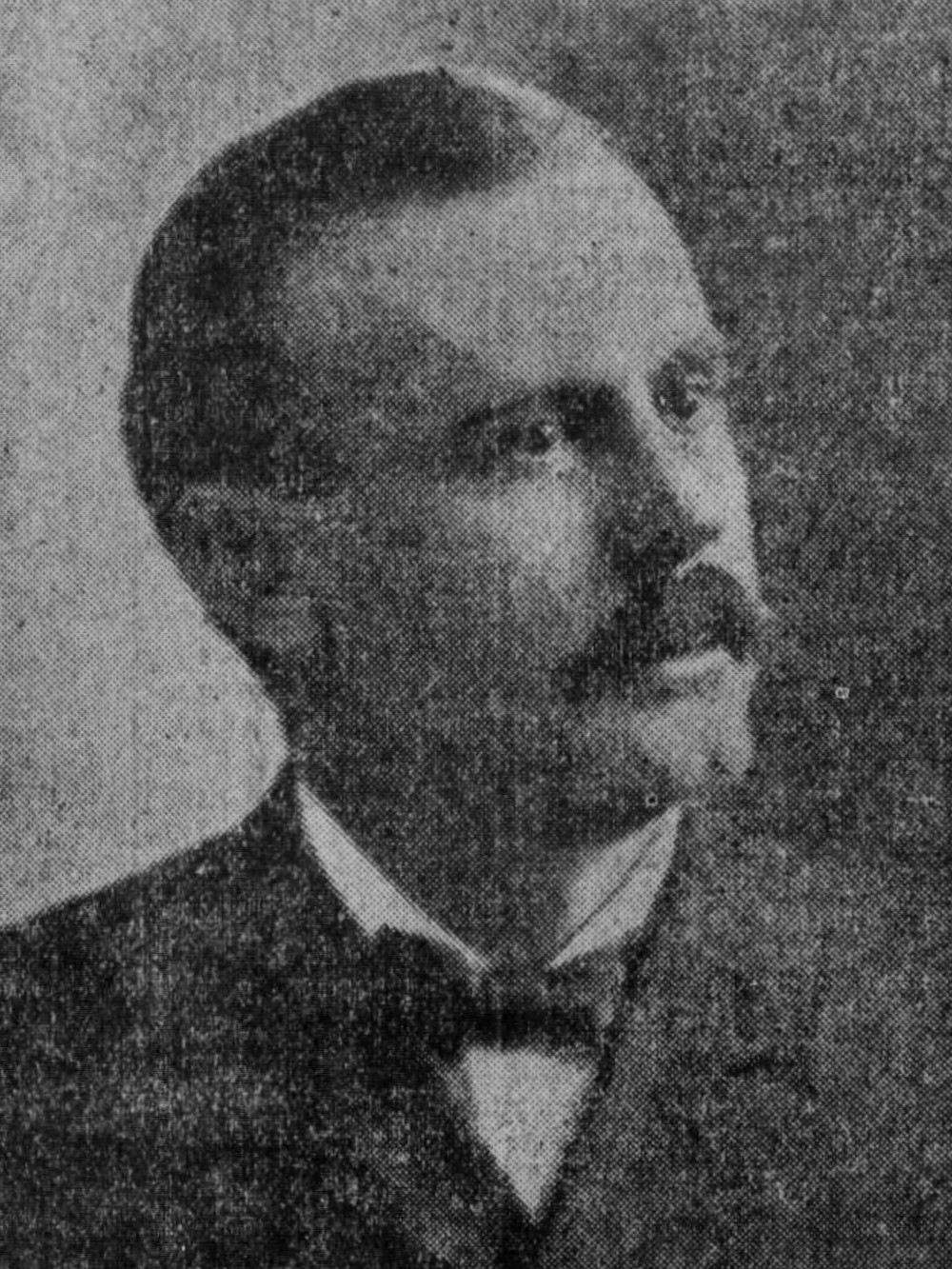

	Majority party	Minority party
Leader	Alfred M. Tunstall	—
Party	Democratic	Republican
Leader since	January 13, 1931	—
Leader's seat	Hale Co.	—
Last election	100 seats	3 seats
Seats won	105	1
Seat change	▲4	▼2
Popular vote	346,988	22,236
Percentage	93.98%	6.02%
	Third party
Party	Jeffersonian "Independent Body"
Last election	3 seats
Seats won	Did not contest
Seat change	▼3
- Democratic gain Democratic hold Republican hold Democratic: 50–60% 60–70% 70–80% 90–100% Unopposed; Republican: 50–60% 60–70% Election results from DeKalb County voided.
Speaker before election
Alfred M. Tunstall
Democratic
Elected Speaker
Robert H. Walker
Democratic

The 1934 Alabama House of Representatives election took place on Tuesday, November 6, 1934, to elect 106 representatives to serve four-year terms in the Alabama House of Representatives. 105 Democrats and one Republican were elected to the 1935 House.

Robert H. Walker of Limestone County was elected Speaker of the House on January 8, 1935.

== General election results ==
In most multi-seat counties, Democratic leaders switched from electing candidates at an at-large basis to electing candidates to designated places. Counties not listed were won by Democrats in both the 1930 and 1934 elections:

- Chambers (2-seat): Two Democrats were elected. Jeffersonians Y. L. Burton and J. W. Hollingsworth were elected to these seats in 1930. Democratic gain.
  - Place 1: Democrat C. A. Spense was elected.
  - Place 2: J. W. Hollingsworth was re-elected as a Democrat. He was elected as a Jeffersonian in 1930.
- Chilton: Democrat C. B. Cox was elected. He defeated incumbent Republican Percy M. Pitts, first elected in 1926. Democratic gain.
- Clay: Democrat M. P. Kelly was elected. He defeated incumbent J. W. Jordan in the Democratic primary, who won this seat as a Jeffersonian in 1930. Democratic gain.
- DeKalb: Democrat R. L. Tolbert was deemed to be elected after a successful contest of the general election results. Republican J. W. Loyd won this seat in 1930. Democratic gain.
- Winston: J. A. Posey was re-elected, first elected in 1930. Republican hold.

=== DeKalb election contest ===
Fraud allegations were brought in the race for DeKalb County's sole House seat between Republican Norman C. Wilkes and Democrat R. L. Torbert. Official election returns had Wilkes defeating Torbert by a margin of 5,458 votes to 5,247. Torbert contested the election of Wilkes, claiming 244 absentee ballots had not been counted. A special committee of the state house counted the absentee ballots, and deemed Torbert victorious by a 27-vote majority. The legislature chose to seat Democrat R. L. Torbert and Wilkes withdrew his claim to the seat. Governor Bibb Graves declared the general election in DeKalb County void and appointed the Democratic candidates to every county office.

== See also ==
- Category:1934 elections in Alabama
  - 1934 United States House of Representatives elections in Alabama
  - 1934 Alabama gubernatorial election
  - 1934 Alabama Senate election
- 1934 United States elections
