= 1914 Alabama House of Representatives election =

- November 3, 1914

All 106 seats in the Alabama House of Representatives 54 seats needed for a majority
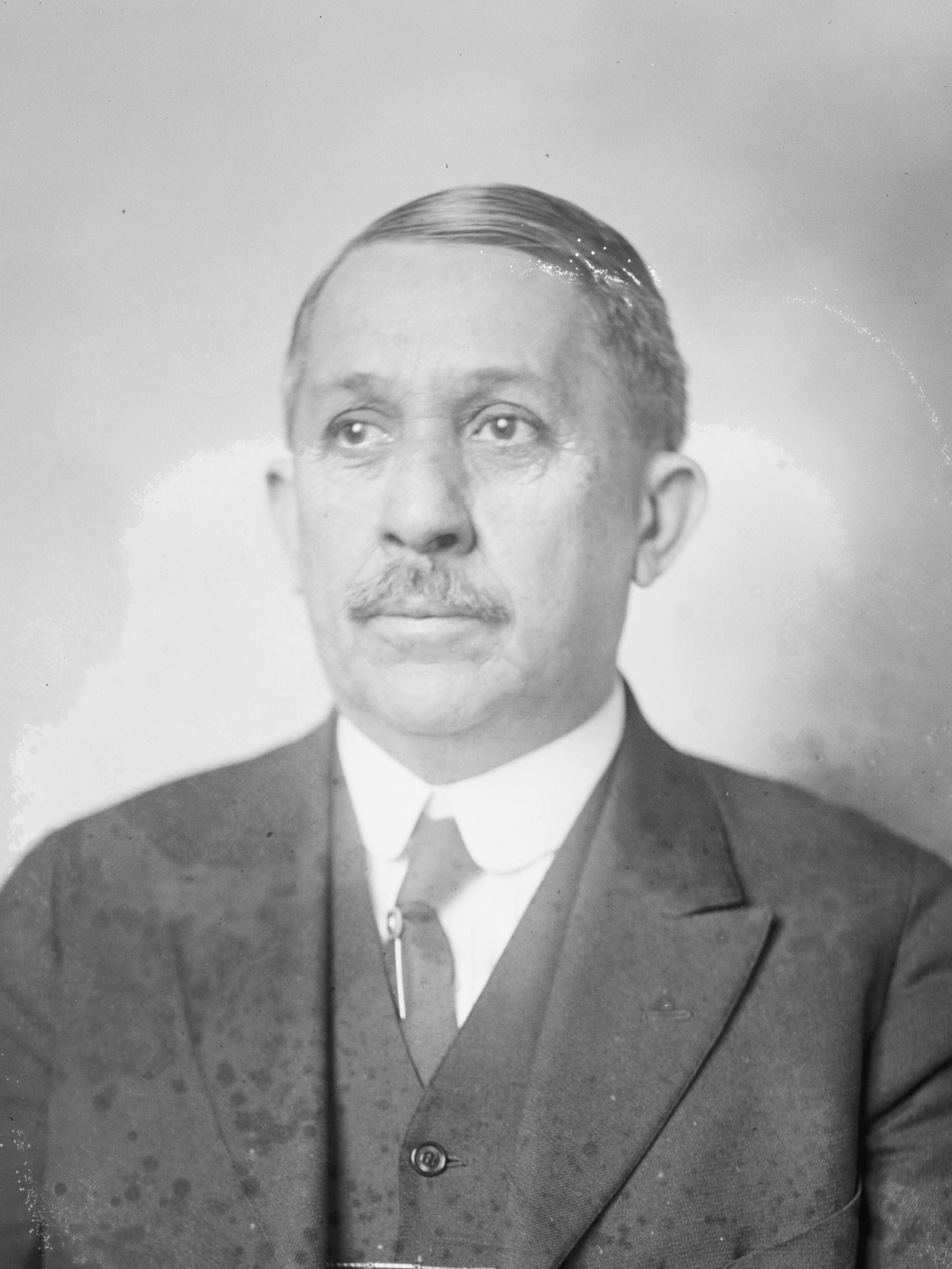

| | Majority party | Minority party |
|---|---|---|
| Leader | Edward B. Almon (did not stand) | — |
| Party | Democratic | Republican |
| Leader since | January 10, 1911 | — |
| Leader's seat | Colbert Co. | — |
| Last election | 102 seats | 4 seats |
| Seats won | 104 | 1 |
| Seat change | ▲2 | ▼3 |
| | Third party |
| Party | Progressive |
| Last election | New |
| Seats won | 1 |
| Seat change | ▲1 |
- Results: Democratic gain Democratic hold Republican hold Progressive gain
Speaker before election
Edward B. Almon
Democratic
Elected Speaker
Archibald H. Carmichael
Democratic

The 1914 Alabama House of Representatives election took place on Tuesday, November 3, 1914, to elect 106 representatives to serve four-year terms in the Alabama House of Representatives. 104 Democrats, 1 Republican, and 1 Progressive were elected to the 1915 House.

Democratic candidates affiliated with the temperance movement won a large majority in both houses of the 1915 Legislature. On January 12, 1915, former speaker Archibald H. Carmichael of Colbert County was nominated speaker with 71 votes to 30.

== General election results ==
Counties not listed were won by Democrats in both the 1910 and 1914 elections:

- Chilton: "Bull Moose" Progressive W. E. Thomas was elected. Republican W. L. Popwell won this seat in 1910.
- Fayette: Democrat J. M. Moore was elected. Republican Sim T. Wright won this seat in 1910.
- Shelby: Democrat H. M. Judge was elected. Republican W. H. Sturdivant won this seat in 1910.
- Winston: Republican Chester Tubb was elected. Republican James E. Edmunds won this seat in 1910.

== See also ==
- Category:1914 elections in Alabama
  - 1914 United States House of Representatives elections in Alabama
  - 1914 Alabama gubernatorial election
- 1914 United States elections
