= William Pluecker =

American businessman, politician and farmer

Member of the Maine House of Representatives from the 44th district
- Incumbent
- Assumed office December 5, 2018
- Preceded by: Paula Sutton
- Succeeded by: Shawn Saindon (elect)

Personal details
- Born: William Donohue Pluecker
- Party: Independent
- Children: 2
- Education: Pitzer College (BA)

William Donohue Pluecker is an American businessman, politician, and farmer serving as a member of the Maine House of Representatives from district 44. Elected in November 2018, he assumed office on December 5, 2018.

== Education ==
Pluecker earned a Bachelor of Arts degree from Pitzer College in 1999.

== Career ==
Pluecker is the co-owner of Begin Again Farm, and has been farming commercially since 2004. He also works for Maine Organic Farmers and Gardeners Association. He was elected to the Maine House of Representatives in November 2018 and assumed office on December 5, 2018. Pluecker is an independent.

== Personal life ==
Pluecker lives in Warren, Maine with his two children. He is a member of the First Universalist Church in Rockland, a member congregation of the Unitarian Universalist Association.
