= Bert Nettles =

American politician (born 1936)

Albert Sheffield "Bert" Nettles
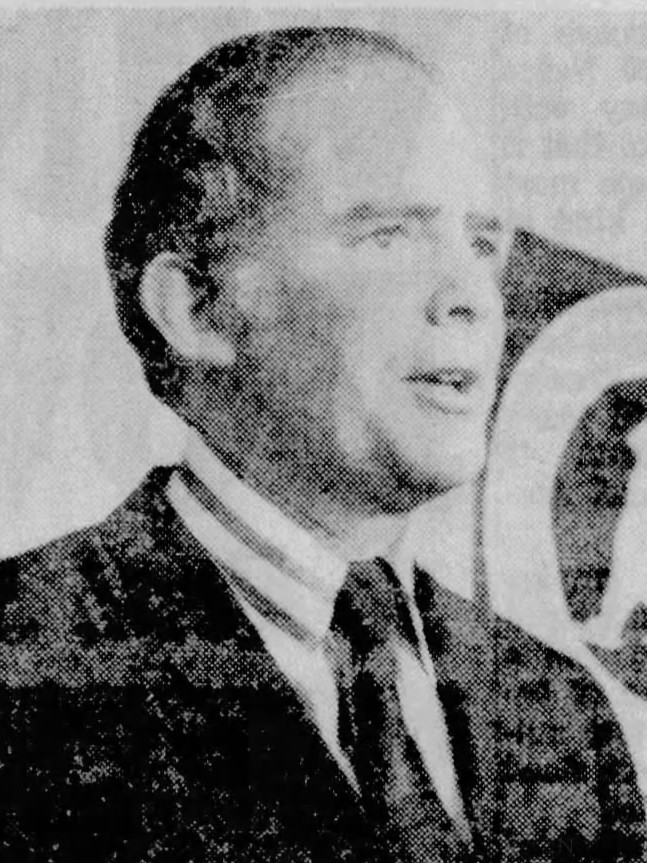

Alabama State Representative from Mobile County
- In office 1969–1974

Personal details
- Born: May 6, 1936 (age 90) Monroeville, Alabama, U.S.
- Party: Republican
- Spouse: Elizabeth D. Nettles
- Children: Mary Katherine Nettles Willis Jane Elizabeth Nettles Nagle Susan S. Nettles Han and Anne Nettles Stanford
- Parent(s): George Lee and Blanche Sheffield Nettles
- Education: University of Alabama; University of Alabama School of Law
- Occupation: Lawyer

Albert Sheffield Nettles, known as Bert Nettles (born May 6, 1936), is an American lawyer and politician in Alabama. He represented Mobile County, Alabama in the Alabama House of Representatives from 1969 to 1974, and was one of the first Republicans to serve in that body since Reconstruction.

In 1972, Nettles ran for the U.S. Senate in the Republican primary, but lost in third place to Winton M. Blount.

Nettles received an undergraduate degree from the University of Alabama in 1958, and a law degree from the University of Alabama School of Law in 1960.
