= Shawn Saindon =

American politician

Member-elect of the Maine House of Representatives from the 44th district
- Assuming office December 2026
- Succeeding: William Pluecker

Personal details
- Party: Independent

Shawn Saindon is an American politician. An independent, he is the member-elect for the 44th district of the Maine House of Representatives.
