= 1906 Alabama House of Representatives election =

- November 6, 1906

All 106 seats in the Alabama House of Representatives 54 seats needed for a majority
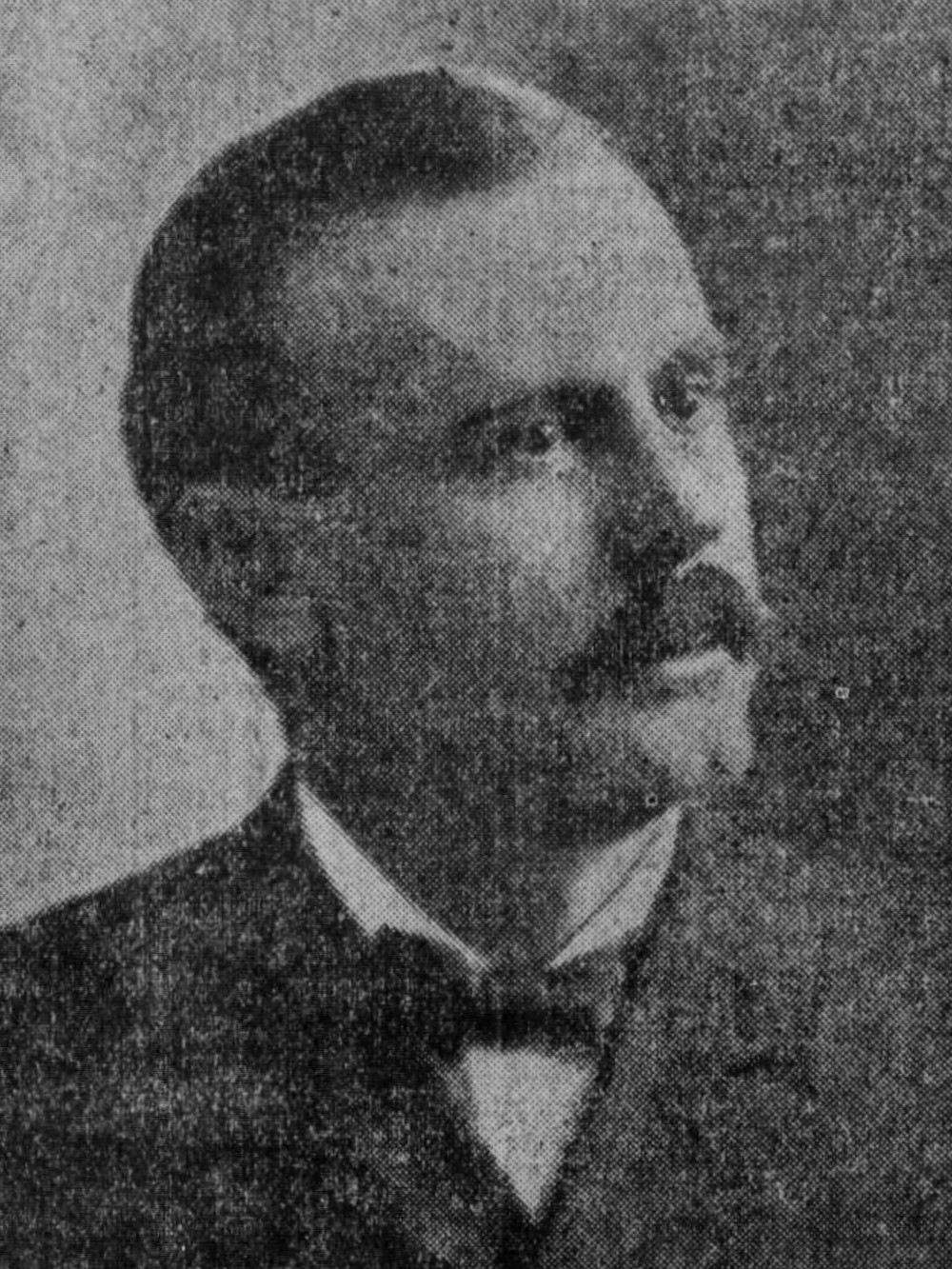

	Majority party	Minority party	Third party
Leader	Alfred M. Tunstall (retired as leader)	—	—
Party	Democratic	Republican	Populist
Leader since	March 1901	—	—
Leader's seat	Hale Co.	—	—
Last election	102 seats	2 seats	1 seat
Seats won	104	2	0
Seat change	▲2	Steady	▼1
- Results: Democratic gain Democratic hold Republican hold
Speaker before election
Alfred M. Tunstall
Democratic
Elected Speaker
William L. Martin
Democratic

The 1906 Alabama House of Representatives election took place on Tuesday, November 6, 1906, to elect 106 representatives to serve four-year terms in the Alabama House of Representatives. The creation of Houston County in 1903 increased the size of the state house from 105 members to 106. 104 Democrats and 2 Republicans were elected to the 1907 House.

On January 8, 1907, William L. Martin of Montgomery County was elected speaker. Martin died shortly into his term, and speaker pro tem Archibald H. Carmichael was chosen to succeed him on March 5, 1907.

== General election results ==
Counties not listed were won by Democrats in both the 1902 and 1906 elections:

- Chilton: Republican J. Osmond Middleton was elected. Republican L. H. Reynolds won this seat in 1902.
- Geneva: Democrat J. R. Alford was elected. Populist W. J. Mills won this seat in 1902.
- Houston: Democrat W. L. Lee was elected. This county did not exist at the 1902 general election.
- Winston: Republican W. M. Barton was elected. Republican P. H. Newman won this seat in 1902.

== See also ==
- Category:1906 elections in Alabama
  - 1906 United States House of Representatives elections in Alabama
  - 1906 Alabama gubernatorial election
- 1906 United States elections
