= Bob Bergren =

American politician

50th Speaker of the Montana House of Representatives
- In office 2009–2011
- Preceded by: Scott Sales
- Succeeded by: Mike Milburn

Member of the Montana House of Representatives
- In office 2003–2011
- Preceded by: Merlin Worley
- Succeeded by: Kristin Hansen
- Constituency: 90th district (2003–2005); 33rd district (2005–2011)

Personal details
- Born: Robert Jerry Bergren
- Party: Democratic
- Spouse: Julie Bergren
- Education: Montana State University
- Occupation: Farmer, business owner

Robert Jerry Bergren Sr. is a Democratic Party member of the Montana House of Representatives, representing District 33 since 2002. He previously served as Speaker of the Montana House of Representatives.
