= 1906 Alabama gubernatorial election =

- November 6, 1906
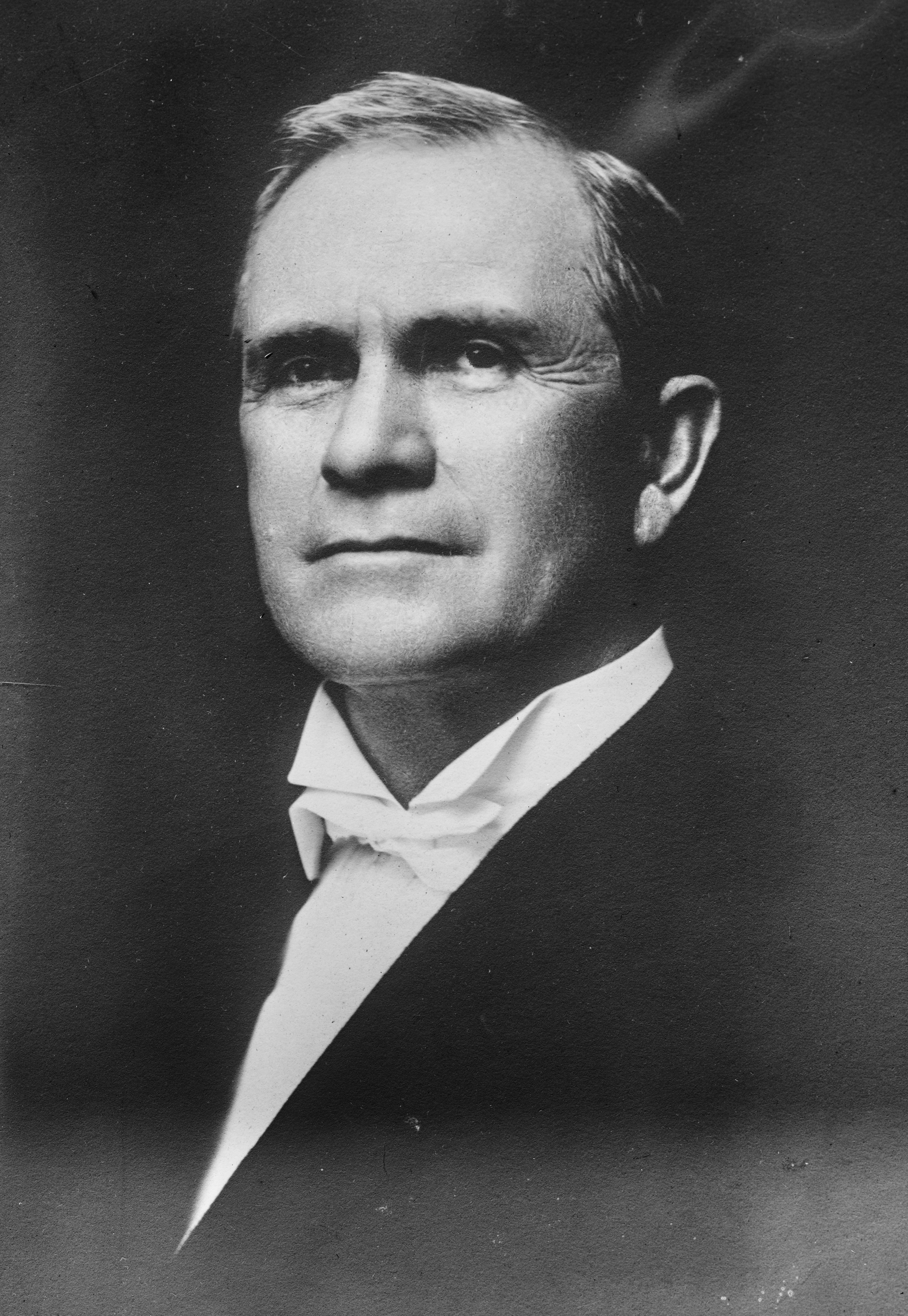

Nominee	B. B. Comer	Asa E. Stratton
Party	Democratic	Republican
Popular vote	61,223	9,981
Percentage	85.48%	13.94%
- County results Comer: 50–60% 60–70% 70–80% 80–90% >90% Stratton: 50–60% Unknown/No Vote
Governor before election
William D. Jelks
Democratic
Elected Governor
B. B. Comer
Democratic

The 1906 Alabama gubernatorial election took place on November 6, 1906, in order to elect the governor of Alabama. Democratic incumbent William D. Jelks was term-limited, and could not seek a second consecutive term.

== Results ==
1906 Alabama gubernatorial election
Party	Candidate	Votes	%
Democratic	B. B. Comer	61,223	85.48
Republican	Asa E. Stratton	9,981	13.94
Socialist	J. N. Abbott	417	0.58
Write-in	J. S. Gilbert	3	<0.01
Total votes		71,624	100.00
Democratic hold			
