= 1960 Alaska House of Representatives election =

- November 8, 1960

All 40 seats in the Alaska House of Representatives 21 seats needed for a majority
	Majority party	Minority party	Third party
Leader	Warren A. Taylor	—	—
Party	Democratic	Republican	Independent
Leader's seat	19–Fairbanks	—	—
Last election	34 seats, 59.60%	5 seats, 36.61%	1 seat, 3.79% (Note: Jay S. Hammond switched to the Republican party after election)
Seats won	21 (Note: Includes independent Robert I. Ditman)	19	0
Seat change	▼13	▲14	▼1
Popular vote	113,365	128,258	252
Percentage	46.87%	53.03%	0.10%
- Results: Democratic gain Independent Democrat gain Republican gain Democratic hold Republican hold Multi-member districts: Majority Democratic Even Majority Republican
Alaska House Speaker before election
Office established
Elected Alaska House Speaker
Warren A. Taylor
Democratic

The 1960 Alaska House of Representatives election was held on November 8, 1960, concurrently with the 1960 United States elections to elect members of the Alaska House of Representatives to the 2nd Alaska State Legislature. It was Alaska's first House election as a state. All 40 seats of the House were up for election, with 20 seats being won by Democrats, one by Independent Democrat Robert I. Ditman, and 19 by Republicans. Republicans gained a net total of 13 Democratic seats, mostly from Anchorage and Fairbanks, and future governor Jay S. Hammond switched from an independent to a Republican.

After the House first convened on January 23, 1961, Warren A. Taylor from Fairbanks was once again elected House speaker.

== Results by district ==
=== District 1 ===
1960 Alaska House of Representatives election, District 1
Party	Candidate	Votes	%
Republican	Alfred E. Widmark	224	50.7
Democratic	Charles M. Jones (incumbent)	218	49.3
Total votes		442	100.0
Republican gain from Democratic			

=== District 2 ===
District 2, based in Ketchikan, elected 2 representatives. Incumbent J. Ray Roady lost renomination in the primary election.

1960 Alaska House of Representatives election, District 2
Party	Candidate	Votes	%
Republican	Walter L. Kubley	2,215	54.0
Republican	William K. Boardman	2,083	50.7
Democratic	Gordon Zerbetz	1,768	43.1
Democratic	Oral E. Freeman (incumbent)	1,711	41.7
Total votes		4,105	100.0
Republican gain from Democratic			

=== District 3 ===
1960 Alaska House of Representatives election, District 3
Party	Candidate	Votes	%
Republican	John E. Longworth (incumbent)	1,019	100.0
Total votes		1,019	100.0
Republican hold			

=== District 4 ===
District 4, based in Sitka elected 2 representatives.

1960 Alaska House of Representatives election, District 4
Party	Candidate	Votes	%
Democratic	Andrew Hope (incumbent)	1,296	55.2
Democratic	Frank E. Cashel (incumbent)	1,206	51.3
Republican	Leslie Yaw	999	42.5
Republican	M. S. "Duke" Mitrovitch	912	38.8
Total votes		2,349	100.0
Democratic hold			

=== District 5 ===
District 5, based in Juneau, elected 2 representatives.

1960 Alaska House of Representatives election, District 5
Party	Candidate	Votes	%
Democratic	Marcus F. Jensen	2,333	52.0
Democratic	Dora M. Sweeney (incumbent)	2,290	51.1
Republican	Mildred R. Hermann	2,156	48.1
Republican	Robert N. Druxman	1,581	35.2
Total votes		4,486	100.0
Democratic hold			

=== District 6 ===
1960 Alaska House of Representatives election, District 6
Party	Candidate	Votes	%
Democratic	Morgan W. Reed (incumbent)	693	63.1
Republican	Clarence H. Mattson	406	36.9
Total votes		1,099	100.0
Democratic hold			

=== District 7 ===
1960 Alaska House of Representatives election, District 7
Party	Candidate	Votes	%
Democratic	Harold Z. Hansen (incumbent)	419	72.5
Write-in	David	159	27.5
Total votes		578	100.0
Democratic hold			

=== District 8 ===
Incumbent Bruce Kendall moved to Anchorage during his term and successfully ran for reelection from District 10.

1960 Alaska House of Representatives election, District 8
Party	Candidate	Votes	%
Independent Democrat	Robert I. Ditman	439	57.6
Republican	George Ingram Ashby	323	42.4
Total votes		762	100.0
Independent Democrat gain from Republican			

=== District 9 ===
1960 Alaska House of Representatives election, District 9
Party	Candidate	Votes	%
Democratic	Jalmar M. Kerttula	1,110	51.3
Republican	Eugene Reid	1,055	48.7
Total votes		2,165	100.0
Democratic hold			

=== District 10 ===
District 10, based in Anchorage, elected 8 representatives. Incumbent Earl D. Hillstrand ran unsuccessfully for the Alaska Senate.

1960 Alaska House of Representatives election, District 10
Party	Candidate	Votes	%
Republican	R. W. Stratton, Jr.	12,081	57.5
Republican	Bruce Kendall	11,529	54.9
Republican	Harold D. Strandberg	11,395	54.2
Republican	James C. Parsons	11,003	52.4
Republican	Henry S. Pratt	10,233	48.7
Republican	William H. Sanders	10,205	48.5
Republican	Bennie Leonard	9,456	45.0
Democratic	John S. Hellenthal (incumbent)	9,385	44.6
Democratic	Warren C. Colver	9,360	44.5
Democratic	Peter J. Kalamarides (incumbent)	9,295	44.2
Democratic	James E. Fisher (incumbent)	9,213	43.8
Democratic	John R. Alcantra	8,867	42.2
Republican	Carolyn C. Martin	8,262	39.3
Democratic	James E. Norene (incumbent)	8,211	39.1
Democratic	E. Russ Meekins (incumbent)	7,738	36.8
Democratic	Blanche McSmith (incumbent)	7,377	35.1
Total votes		20,998	100.0
Republican gain from Democratic			

=== District 11 ===
1960 Alaska House of Representatives election, District 11
Party	Candidate	Votes	%
Democratic	William M. Erwin (incumbent)	674	57.3
Republican	Ray F. James	502	42.7
Total votes		1,176	100.0
Democratic hold			

=== District 12 ===
Incumbent Allen L. Peterson lost renomination in the primary election.

1960 Alaska House of Representatives election, District 15
Party	Candidate	Votes	%
Republican	Leo F. Rhode	1,104	53.0
Democratic	Quincy Benton	978	47.0
Total votes		2,082	100.0
Republican gain from Democratic			

=== District 13 ===
District 13, based in Kodiak, elected 2 representatives.

1960 Alaska House of Representatives election, District 13
Party	Candidate	Votes	%
Democratic	Gilbert A. Jarvela	1,138	74.2
Democratic	Peter M. Deveau (incumbent)	933	60.9
Republican	John P. Trent	422	27.5
Republican	Emil Knudsen	325	21.2
Total votes		1,533	100.0
Democratic hold			

=== District 14 ===
1960 Alaska House of Representatives election, District 14
Party	Candidate	Votes	%
Democratic	Arthur J. Harris	391	68.1
Write-in (Democratic)	Charles J. Franz (incumbent)	182	31.8
Total votes		573	100.0
Democratic hold			

=== District 15 ===
Jay S. Hammond was originally elected in 1958 as an independent, switching to the Republican party for the 1960 election.

1960 Alaska House of Representatives election, District 15
Party	Candidate	Votes	%
Republican	Jay S. Hammond (incumbent)	506	51.6
Democratic	David C. Harrison	475	48.4
Total votes		981	100.0
Republican hold			

=== District 16 ===
1960 Alaska House of Representatives election, District 16
Party	Candidate	Votes	%
Democratic	Raymond C. Christiansen	533	57.4
Republican	James Hoffman (incumbent)	396	42.6
Total votes		929	100.0
Democratic gain from Republican			

=== District 17 ===
1960 Alaska House of Representatives election, District 17
Party	Candidate	Votes	%
Republican	Donald Harris (incumbent)	410	65.8
Democratic	Barbara Pettit Rogers	213	34.2
Total votes		623	100.0
Republican hold			

=== District 18 ===
1960 Alaska House of Representatives election, District 18
Party	Candidate	Votes	%
Democratic	Grant H. Pearson (incumbent)	472	51.3
Republican	Berle E. Mercer	449	48.7
Total votes		921	100.0
Democratic hold			

=== District 19 ===
District 19, based in Fairbanks, elected 5 representatives.

1960 Alaska House of Representatives election, District 19
Party	Candidate	Votes	%
Republican	Charles M. "Jim" Binkley	5,508	57.8
Democratic	Frank X. Chapados (incumbent)	4,834	50.8
Republican	Edgar I. Baggen	4,800	50.4
Republican	Forbes L. Baker	4,682	49.2
Democratic	Warren A. Taylor (incumbent)	4,559	47.9
Republican	Kenneth Ringstad	4,464	46.9
Democratic	Robert E. Sheldon (incumbent)	4,353	45.7
Republican	Harry Kerns Gayley	4,199	44.1
Democratic	Richard J. Greuel (incumbent)	4,092	43.0
Democratic	Bob Giersdorf (incumbent)	3,632	38.1
Total votes		9,513	100.0
Republican gain from Democratic			

=== District 20 ===
1960 Alaska House of Representatives election, District 20
Party	Candidate	Votes	%
Write-in (Republican)	Kenneth A. Garrison	210	57.4
Democratic	R.S. McCombe (incumbent)	107	29.2
Republican	George E. King	49	13.4
Total votes		366	100.0
Republican gain from Democratic			

=== District 21 ===
1960 Alaska House of Representatives election, District 21
Party	Candidate	Votes	%
Democratic	John Nusunginya (incumbent)	356	100.0
Total votes		356	100.0
Democratic hold			

=== District 22 ===
1960 Alaska House of Representatives election, District 22
Party	Candidate	Votes	%
Democratic	Jacob A. Stalker	449	55.0
Republican	John E. Curtis (incumbent)	368	45.0
Total votes		817	100.0
Democratic gain from Republican			

=== District 23 ===
District 23 elected 2 representatives.

1960 Alaska House of Representatives election, District 23
Party	Candidate	Votes	%
Democratic	Robert R. Blodgett (incumbent)	982	52.5
Republican	Arthur D. Johnson	909	48.6
Democratic	Charles E. Fagerstrom (incumbent)	782	41.8
Republican	Myrtle Fagerstrom Johnson	695	37.2
Total votes		1,868	100.0
Republican gain from Democratic			

=== District 24 ===
1960 Alaska House of Representatives election, District 24
Party	Candidate	Votes	%
Write-in (Democratic)	Segundo Llorente	210	53.3
Write-in	Axel C. Johnson (incumbent)	93	23.6
Democratic	Lawrence A. "Larry" Paquette	91	23.0
Total votes		394	100.0
Democratic hold			

== See also ==
- 2nd Alaska State Legislature
- 1960 United States elections
