= 1st Alaska State Legislature =

Term of state legislature in Alaska, US

The 1st Alaska State Legislature served during 1959 and 1960. All of its members were elected on November 26, 1958, when Alaska was in its last days as a territory.

== Terms ==
The Alaska Constitution established that legislative terms begin on the fourth Monday in January following an election year, and that the date may be changed by statute. This legislature passed Senate Bill 70 in the first session, which placed the date into statute but did not actually change it.

- All terms began on January 26, 1959
- All terms of representatives, and of those senators serving short terms, expired on January 22, 1961
- All terms of senators serving long terms expired on January 27, 1963

== Sessions ==
- 1st session: January 26, 1959 – April 16, 1959
- 2nd session: January 25, 1960 – March 29, 1960

== Alaska Senate ==
=== Make-up ===
Affiliation	Members
Democratic Party	18
Republican Party	2
Total	20
Government Majority	16

=== Members ===
District	Name	Life	Party	Location
A	James Nolan	1901–1991	Dem	Wrangell
A	Frank Peratrovich	1895–1984	Dem	Klawock
B	Walter O. "Bo" Smith	1907–1987	Dem	Ketchikan
C	Howard C. Bradshaw	1908–1994	Dem	Sitka
D	Thomas B. Stewart	1919–2007	Dem	Juneau
E	Ralph E. Moody	1915–1997	Dem	Anchorage
E	Irene E. Ryan	1909–1997	Dem	Anchorage
F	Balfour J. "Bob" Logan	1906–1974	Dem	Cordova
G	Joseph Earl Cooper	1907–1964	Dem	Anchorage
H	Irwin L. Metcalf	1908–1973	Dem	Seward
I	Alfred A. Owen	1910–1985	Dem	Uganik Bay
J	George B. McNabb, Jr.	1919–1992	Dem	Fairbanks
J	Robert J. McNealy	1907–1978	Dem	Fairbanks
K	Jack E. Weise	1915–2000	Rep	Bethel
L	John B. Coghill	1925–2019	Rep	Nenana
M	Hubert A. Gilbert	1914–1984	Dem	Fairbanks
N	William E. Beltz	1912–1960	Dem	Unalakleet
N	Lester Bronson	1905–1972	Dem	Nome
O	Eben Hopson	1922–1980	Dem	Barrow
P	John A. McNees	1917–1995	Dem	Nome

=== Leadership ===
- Senate President: William E. Beltz (D-Unalakleet)

== Alaska House of Representatives ==
=== Make-up ===
Affiliation	Members
Democratic Party	34
Republican Party	5
Independent	1
Total	40
Government Majority	28

=== Members ===
District	Name	Life	Party	Location
1	Charles M. Jones	1921–2002	Dem	Craig
2	Oral E. Freeman	1915–2001	Dem	Ketchikan
2	James R. "J. Ray" Roady	1907–1997	Dem	Ketchikan
3	John E. Longworth	1910–1985	Rep	Petersburg
4	Frank E. Cashel	1918–1991	Dem	Sitka
4	Andrew Hope	1896–1968	Dem	Sitka
5	Douglas Gray	1908–1980	Dem	Douglas
5	Dora M. Sweeney	1907–2001	Dem	Juneau
6	Morgan W. Reed	1904–[?]	Dem	Skagway
7	Harold Z. Hansen	1910–1993	Ind-D	Cordova
8	Bruce Kendall	1919–2012	Rep	Valdez
9	James J. Hurley	1915–2002	Dem	Palmer
10	Helen M. Fischer	1912–1986	Dem	Anchorage
10	James E. Fisher	1927–2020	Dem	Anchorage
10	John S. Hellenthal	1915–1989	Dem	Anchorage
10	Earl D. Hillstrand	1913–1974	Dem	Anchorage
10	Peter J. Kalamarides	1916–1979	Dem	Anchorage
10	Edward R. "Russ" Meekins	1915–1995	Dem	Anchorage
10	James E. Norene	1905–1996	Dem	Anchorage
10	John L. Rader	1927–	Dem	Anchorage
11	William M. Erwin	1933–2022	Dem	Seward
12	Allan L. Petersen	1890–1969	Dem	Kenai
13	Peter M. Deveau	1917–2002	Dem	Kodiak
13	Henry L. Haag	1895–1969	Dem	Kodiak
14	Charles J. Franz	1910–1996	Dem	Port Moller
15	Jay S. Hammond	1922–2005	Ind	Naknek
16	James Hoffman	1925–1982	Rep	Bethel
17	Donald Harris	1928–2011	Rep	McGrath
18	Grant H. Pearson	1900–1978	Dem	McKinley Park
19	Frank X. Chapados	1914–2007	Dem	Fairbanks
19	Joseph R. "Bob" Giersdorf	1935–2003	Dem	Fairbanks
19	Richard J. Greuel	1928–2013	Dem	Fairbanks
19	Robert E. Sheldon	1883–1983	Dem	Fairbanks
19	Warren A. Taylor	1891–1980	Dem	Fairbanks
20	R.S. McCombe	1902–1985	Dem	Chicken
21	John Nusunginya	1927–1981	Dem	Point Barrow
22	John E. Curtis	1915–1999	Rep	Kotzebue
23	Robert R. Blodgett	1920–1990	Dem	Nome
23	Charles E. Fagerstrom	1905–1962	Dem	Nome
24	Axel C. Johnson	1911–1985	Dem	Kwiguk

=== Leadership ===
- Speaker of the House: Warren A. Taylor (D-Fairbanks)

== See also ==
- List of Alaska State Legislatures
- 2nd Alaska State Legislature, the legislature following this one
- List of governors of Alaska
- List of speakers of the Alaska House of Representatives
- {AKLeg.gov}
