= 2nd Alaska State Legislature =

Term of state legislature in Alaska, US

The 2nd Alaska State Legislature was elected November 8, 1960.

== Sessions ==
- 1st session: January 23, 1961 – April 7, 1961
- 2nd session: January 23, 1962 – April 12, 1962

== Alaska Senate ==
=== Make-up ===
Affiliation	Members
Democratic Party	13
Republican Party	7
Total	20
Government Majority	6

=== Members ===
District	Name	Party	Location
A	James Nolan	Dem	Wrangell
A	Frank Peratrovich	Dem	Klawock
B	W. O. Smith	Dem	Ketchikan
C	Howard C. Bradshaw	Dem	Sitka
D	Elton E. Engstrom	Rep	Juneau
E	Vance Phillips	Rep	Anchorage
E	Howard W. Pollock	Rep	Anchorage
F	B. J. Logan	Dem	Cordova
G	Brad Phillips	Rep	Anchorage
H	Irwin L. Metcalf	Dem	Seward
I	Alfred A. Owen	Dem	Uganik Bay
J	George B. McNabb, Jr.	Dem	Fairbanks
J	Robert J. McNealy	Dem	Fairbanks
K	Jack E. Weise	Rep	Bethel
L	John B. Coghill	Rep	Nenana
M	Paul Greimann, Sr.	Rep	Fairbanks
N	Lester Bronson	Dem	Nome
N	Pearse E. "Pete" Walsh	Dem	Nome
O	Eben Hopson	Dem	Barrow
P	John A. McNees	Dem	Nome

=== Leadership ===
- Senate President: Frank Peratrovich (D-Klawock)
- Majority Leader: Robert J. McNealy (D-Fairbanks)
- Minority Leader: John B. Coghill (R-Nenana)

== Alaska House of Representatives ==
=== Make-up ===
Affiliation	Members
Republican Party	20
Democratic Party	19
Independent	1
Total	40
Government Majority	0

=== Members ===
District	Name	Party	Location
1	Alfred E. Widmark	Rep	Klawock
2	William K. Boardman	Rep	Ketchikan
2	Walter L. Kubley	Rep	Ketchikan
3	John E. Longworth	Rep	Petersburg
4	Frank E. Cashel	Dem	Sitka
4	Andrew Hope	Dem	Sitka
5	Marcus F. Jensen	Dem	Douglas
5	Dora M. Sweeney	Dem	Juneau
6	Morgan W. Reed	Dem	Skagway
7	Harold Z. Hansen	Dem	Cordova
8	Robert I. Ditman	Ind	Valdez
9	Jalmar M. Kerttula	Dem	Palmer
10	John S. Hellenthal	Rep	Anchorage
10	Bruce Kendall	Rep	Anchorage
10	Bennie Leonard	Rep	Anchorage
10	James C. Parsons	Rep	Anchorage
10	Henry S. Pratt	Rep	Anchorage
10	William H. Sanders	Rep	Anchorage
10	Harold D. Strandberg	Rep	Anchorage
10	R. W. Stratton, Jr.	Rep	Spenard
11	William M. Erwin	Dem	Seward
12	Leo F. Rhode	Rep	Homer
13	Peter M. Deveau	Dem	Kodiak
13	Gilbert A. Jarvela	Dem	Kodiak
14	Arthur J. Harris	Dem	Nikolski
15	Jay S. Hammond	Rep	Naknek
16	Raymond C. Christiansen	Dem	Bethel
17	Donald Harris	Rep	McGrath
18	Grant H. Pearson	Dem	Nenana
19	Edgar I. Baggen	Rep	Fairbanks
19	Forbes L. Baker	Rep	Fairbanks
19	Charles M. "Jim" Binkley	Rep	College
19	Frank X. Chapados	Dem	Fairbanks
19	Warren A. Taylor	Dem	Fairbanks
20	Kenneth A. Garrison	Rep	Fort Yukon
21	John Nusunginya	Dem	Point Barrow
22	Jacob A. Stalker	Dem	Kotzebue
23	Robert R. Blodgett	Dem	Teller
23	Arthur D. Johnson	Rep	Nome
24	Segundo Llorente	Dem	Alakanuk

=== Leadership ===
- Speaker of the House: Warren A. Taylor (D-Fairbanks)
- Majority Leader: Peter M. Deveau (D-Kodiak)
- Minority Leader: Bruce Kendall (R-Anchorage)

=== House committee assignments ===
- Finance
  - Chapados (chair)
- Judiciary
  - Hellenthal (chair)
- Rules
  - Erwin (chair)

== Key Legislative Staff ==
- Secretary of the Senate: Evelyn K. Stevenson
- Chief Clerk of the House: Esther Reed
- Executive Director of Legislative Council: John C. Doyle
- Legislative Auditor: Robert Dyer

== See also ==
- List of Alaska State Legislatures
- 1st Alaska State Legislature, the legislature preceding this one
- 3rd Alaska State Legislature, the legislature following this one
- List of governors of Alaska
- List of speakers of the Alaska House of Representatives
- {AKLeg.gov}
