= 1958 Alaska House of Representatives election =

- November 26, 1958

All 40 seats in the Alaska House of Representatives 21 seats needed for a majority
	Majority party	Minority party	Third party
Leader	Warren A. Taylor	—	—
Party	Democratic	Republican	Independent
Leader's seat	19–Fairbanks	—	—
Seats won	34 (Note: Includes Harold Z. Hansen, who was elected on an independent ticket)	5	1
Popular vote	114,248	70,178	7,270
Percentage	59.60%	36.61%	3.79%
- Results: Democratic gain Independent Democrat gain Independent gain Republican gain Multi-member districts: Majority Democratic
Alaska House Speaker before election
Office established
Elected Alaska House Speaker
Warren A. Taylor
Democratic

The 1958 Alaska House of Representatives election was held on November 26, 1958, in Alaska's last days as a territory to elect members of the 1st Alaska State Legislature. All 40 seats of the House were up for election, with 33 seats being won by Democrats, one by Independent Democrat Harold Z. Hansen, five by Republicans, and one by political independent and future Republican Governor Jay S. Hammond.

Warren A. Taylor from Fairbanks was elected House speaker on January 26, 1959, three weeks after Alaska became the 49th state.

== Results by district ==
Only candidate's last names are listed on the official general election returns.

=== District 1 ===
1958 Alaska House of Representatives election, District 1
Party	Candidate	Votes	%
Democratic	Charles M. Jones	263	64.6
Independent	Widmark	144	35.4
Total votes		407	100.0

=== District 2 ===
1958 Alaska House of Representatives election, District 2
Party	Candidate	Votes	%
Democratic	Oral E. Freeman	2,048	31.3
Democratic	James R. "J. Ray" Roady	1,954	29.9
Republican	Placentia	1,483	22.7
Republican	Tobin	1,054	16.1
Total votes		6,539	100.0

=== District 3 ===
1958 Alaska House of Representatives election, District 3
Party	Candidate	Votes	%
Republican	John E. Longworth	1,054	60.5
Democratic	Lee	687	39.5
Total votes		1,741	100.0

=== District 4 ===
1958 Alaska House of Representatives election, District 4
Party	Candidate	Votes	%
Democratic	Frank E. Cashel	1,297	32.3
Democratic	Andrew Hope	1,208	30.1
Republican	Van Horn	896	22.3
Republican	Sarvela	614	15.3
Total votes		4,015	100.0

=== District 5 ===
1958 Alaska House of Representatives election, District 5
Party	Candidate	Votes	%
Democratic	Dora M. Sweeney	2,252	31.7
Democratic	Douglas Gray	2,101	29.6
Republican	McLean	2,010	28.3
Republican	Krause	740	10.4
Total votes		7,103	100.0

=== District 6 ===
1958 Alaska House of Representatives election, District 6
Party	Candidate	Votes	%
Democratic	Morgan W. Reed	603	53.9
Independent	McLean	446	39.9
Republican	Krause	70	6.3
Total votes		1,119	100.0

=== District 7 ===
1958 Alaska House of Representatives election, District 7
Party	Candidate	Votes	%
Independent Democrat	Harold Z. Hansen	267	40.4
Democratic	Buck	245	37.1
Republican	Rosswog	149	22.5
Total votes		661	100.0

=== District 8 ===
1958 Alaska House of Representatives election, District 8
Party	Candidate	Votes	%
Republican	Bruce B. Kendall	333	45.3
Democratic	Welch	320	43.5
Independent (Note: labelled as "AP")	Ewan	82	11.1
Total votes		735	100.0

=== District 9 ===
1958 Alaska House of Representatives election, District 9
Party	Candidate	Votes	%
Democratic	James J. Hurley	891	57.5
Independent	Ewan	370	23.9
Republican	McKinley	288	18.6
Total votes		1,549	100.0

=== District 10 ===
1958 Alaska House of Representatives election, District 10
Party	Candidate	Votes	%
Democratic	John L. Rader	9,846	8.5
Democratic	Earl D. Hillstrand	9,411	8.1
Democratic	John S. Hellenthal	9,075	7.9
Democratic	Helen Fischer	8,487	7.3
Democratic	Edward R. "Russ" Meekins	8,373	7.2
Democratic	Peter J. Kalamarides	8,336	7.2
Democratic	James E. Fisher	8,088	7.0
Democratic	James E. Norene	8,036	7.0
Republican	Waldron	7,006	6.1
Republican	Sheffard	6,559	5.7
Republican	Dianes	5,221	4.5
Republican	White	5,062	4.4
Republican	McLean	4,787	4.1
Republican	Nelson	4,761	4.1
Republican	Arnett	4,661	4.0
Independent	Frior	4,415	3.8
Republican	Fink	3,485	3.0
Total votes		115,609	100.0

=== District 11 ===
1958 Alaska House of Representatives election, District 11
Party	Candidate	Votes	%
Democratic	William M. Erwin	599	57.8
Republican	Williams	438	42.2
Total votes		1,037	100.0

=== District 12 ===
1958 Alaska House of Representatives election, District 12
Party	Candidate	Votes	%
Democratic	Allan L. Petersen	824	54.5
Republican	Rhode	688	45.5
Total votes		1,512	100.0

=== District 13 ===
1958 Alaska House of Representatives election, District 13
Party	Candidate	Votes	%
Democratic	Peter M. Deveau	751	36.1
Democratic	Henry L. Haag	554	26.6
Republican	Nelson	425	20.4
Republican	Clark	352	16.9
Total votes		2,082	100.0

=== District 14 ===
1958 Alaska House of Representatives election, District 14
Party	Candidate	Votes	%
Democratic	Charles J. Franz	357	75.3
Independent	Berikoff	117	24.7
Total votes		474	100.0

=== District 15 ===
1958 Alaska House of Representatives election, District 15
Party	Candidate	Votes	%
Independent	Jay S. Hammond	350	49.5
Independent	Noden	190	26.9
Republican	Moore	167	23.6
Total votes		707	100.0

=== District 16 ===
1958 Alaska House of Representatives election, District 16
Party	Candidate	Votes	%
Republican	James Hoffman	563	100.0
Total votes		563	100.0

=== District 17 ===
1958 Alaska House of Representatives election, District 17
Party	Candidate	Votes	%
Republican	Donald Harris	295	50.6
Democratic	Begin	288	49.4
Total votes		583	100.0

=== District 18 ===
1958 Alaska House of Representatives election, District 18
Party	Candidate	Votes	%
Democratic	Grant H. Pearson	472	54.5
Republican	Huntington	394	45.5
Total votes		866	100.0

=== District 19 ===
1958 Alaska House of Representatives election, District 19
Party	Candidate	Votes	%
Democratic	Frank X. Chapados	5,294	13.3
Democratic	Richard J. Greuel	4,835	12.1
Democratic	Joseph R. "Bob" Giersdorf	4,698	11.8
Democratic	Warren A. Taylor	4,616	11.6
Democratic	Robert E. Sheldon	4,591	11.5
Republican	Joy	3,315	8.3
Republican	Polet	3,084	7.7
Republican	Boswell	3,037	7.6
Republican	Ringstad	3,010	7.6
Republican	Collins	2,497	6.3
Independent (Note: labelled as "AP")	Purvis	299	0.8
Independent	Warbelow	258	0.7
Independent	Moring	211	0.5
Independent	Ryczkowski	121	0.3
Total votes		39,866	100.0

=== District 20 ===
1958 Alaska House of Representatives election, District 20
Party	Candidate	Votes	%
Democratic	R.S. McCombe	318	65.3
Republican	Hannum	169	34.7
Total votes		487	100.0

=== District 21 ===
1958 Alaska House of Representatives election, District 21
Party	Candidate	Votes	%
Democratic	John Nusunginya	290	100.0
Total votes		290	100.0

=== District 22 ===
1958 Alaska House of Representatives election, District 22
Party	Candidate	Votes	%
Republican	John E. Curtis	395	50.8
Democratic	Lincoln	383	49.2
Total votes		778	100.0

=== District 23 ===
1958 Alaska House of Representatives election, District 23
Party	Candidate	Votes	%
Democratic	Robert R. Blodgett	831	30.7
Democratic	Charles E. Fagerstrom	761	28.1
Republican	Gray	586	21.6
Republican	Martin	530	19.6
Total votes		2,708	100.0

=== District 24 ===
1958 Alaska House of Representatives election, District 24
Party	Candidate	Votes	%
Democratic	Axel C. Johnson	265	100.0
Total votes		265	100.0

== See also ==
- 1st Alaska State Legislature
- 1958 Alaska Senate election
- 1958 United States elections
