= 3rd Alaska State Legislature =

Term of state legislature in Alaska, US

The Third Alaska State Legislature served from January 1963 to January 1965.

== Senate ==
District	Name	Party	Location
A	James Nolan	Dem	Wrangell
A	Frank Peratrovich	Dem	Klawock
B	Walter O. "Bo" Smith	Dem	Ketchikan
C	Howard C. Bradshaw	Dem	Sitka
D	Elton E. Engstrom	Rep	Juneau
D	Mildred H. Banfield	Rep	Juneau
E	Nicholas J. Begich	Dem	Fort Richardson
E	Vance Phillips	Rep	Mountain View
F	Harold Z. Hansen	Dem	Cordova
G	Brad Phillips	Rep	Anchorage
H	Yule F. Kilcher	Dem	Homer
I	Alfred A. Owen	Dem	Uganik Bay
J	John Butrovich, Jr.	Rep	Fairbanks
J	Robert J. McNealy	Dem	Fairbanks
K	David C. Harrison	Dem	Dillingham
L	John B. Coghill	Rep	Nenana
M	John B. "Dixie" Hall	Dem	Fairbanks
N	Lester Bronson	Dem	Nome
N	Neal W. Foster	Dem	Deering
O	Eben Hopson	Dem	Barrow
P	Pearse M. Walsh	Dem	Nome

== House ==
District	Name	Party	Location
1	William K. Boardman	Rep	Ketchikan
1	Walter L. Kubley	Rep	Ketchikan
2	John E. Longworth	Rep	Petersburg
3	Frank E. Cashel	Dem	Sitka
4	Dora M. Sweeney	Dem	Juneau
4	William H. Whitehead	Dem	Juneau
5	Morgan W. Reed	Dem	Skagway
6	Robert I. Ditman	Dem	Valdez
7	Eugene Reid	Rep	Palmer
8	Mike Gravel	Dem	Anchorage
8	Earl D. Hillstrand	Dem	Anchorage
8	Joseph P. Josephson	Dem	Anchorage
8	Bruce Kendall	Rep	Anchorage
8	Bennie Leonard	Rep	Anchorage
8	Carl F. Lottsfeldt	Dem	Anchorage
8	Keith H. Miller	Rep	Anchorage
8	Homer Moseley	Dem	Anchorage
8	James C. Parsons	Rep	Anchorage
8	John L. Rader	Dem	Anchorage
8	William H. Sanders	Rep	Anchorage
8	Harold D. Strandberg	Rep	Anchorage
8	George M. Sullivan	Rep	Anchorage
8	Jack H. White	Rep	Anchorage
8	William C. Wiggins	Rep	Anchorage
9	Charles E. Cole, Sr.	Rep	Seward
10	Clem V. Tillion	Rep	Halibut Cove
11	Gilbert A. Jarvela	Dem	Kodiak
12	Arthur J. Harris	Dem	Nikolski
13	Jay S. Hammond	Rep	Naknek
14	Raymond C. Christiansen	Dem	Bethel
15	Grant H. Pearson	Dem	Nenana
16	Edgar I. Baggen	Rep	Fairbanks
16	Forbes L. Baker	Rep	Fairbanks
16	C. M. "Jim" Binkley	Rep	College
16	John Holm	Rep	Fairbanks
16	R. S. McCombe	Dem	Chicken
16	Maurice V. Smith	Rep	Fairbanks
16	Warren A. Taylor	Dem	Fairbanks
17	Jacob A. Stalker	Dem	Kotzebue
18	Robert R. Blodgett	Dem	Teller
19	Axel C. Johnson	Dem	Emmonak

== See also ==
- List of Alaska State Legislatures
- 2nd Alaska State Legislature, the legislature preceding this one
- 4th Alaska State Legislature, the legislature following this one
- List of governors of Alaska
- List of speakers of the Alaska House of Representatives
- Alaska Legislature
- Alaska Senate
- {AKLeg.gov}
