= 4th Alaska State Legislature =

Term of state legislature in Alaska, US

The Fourth Alaska State Legislature served from January 25, 1965, to January 22, 1967.

== Senate ==
=== Senate members ===
District	Name	Party	Location
A	James Nolan	Dem	Wrangell
A	Frank Peratrovich	Dem	Klawock
B	Robert H. Ziegler, Sr.	Dem	Ketchikan
C	Howard C. Bradshaw	Dem	Sitka
D	Richard L. Peter	Dem	Juneau
E	Nicholas J. Begich	Dem	Spenard
E	Howard W. Pollock	Rep	Anchorage
F	Harold Z. Hansen	Dem	Cordova
G	Brad Phillips	Rep	Anchorage
H	Yule F. Kilcher	Dem	Homer
I	Alfred A. Owen	Dem	Uganik Bay
J	John Butrovich, Jr.	Rep	Fairbanks
J	Robert J. McNealy	Dem	Fairbanks
K	David C. Harrison	Dem	Dillingham
L	Grant H. Pearson	Dem	Nenana
M	John B. "Dixie" Hall	Dem	Fairbanks
N	Robert R. Blodgett	Dem	Teller
N	Neal W. Foster	Dem	Nome
O	Eben Hopson	Dem	Barrow
P	Pearse M. Walsh	Dem	Nome

=== Senate leadership ===
- Senate President: Robert J. McNealy (D-Fairbanks)
- Majority Leader: Frank Peratrovich (D-Fairbanks)
- Minority Leader: Brad Phillips (R-Anchorage)

=== Senate committee assignments ===
- Commerce
  - Nolan (chair), Foster, Ziegler, Hansen, Pollock
- Finance
  - Bradshaw (chair), Blodgett, Harrison, Walsh, Kilcher, Phillips, Peter
- Health, Welfare and Education
  - Hall (chair), Ziegler, Begich, Hopson, Phillips
- Judiciary
  - Ziegler (chair), Nolan, Hall, Begich, Pollock
- Labor and Management
  - Foster (chair), Pearson, Hansen, Owen, Phillips
- Local Government
  - Hansen (chair), Hopson, Peter, Pearson, Pollock
- Resources
  - Kilcher (chair), Peratrovich, Harrison, Foster, Butrovich
- Rules
  - Peratrovich (chair), Bradshaw, Hall, Walsh, Pollock
- State Affairs
  - Harrison (chair), Blodgett, Peter, Owen, Butrovich

== House ==
=== House members ===
District	Name	Party	Location
1	William K. Boardman	Rep	Ketchikan
1	Lucille Pinkerton	Dem	Ketchikan
2	Ernest J. Haugen	Rep	Petersburg
3	John W. O'Connell	Dem	Sitka
4	Elton E. Engstrom, Jr.	Rep	Juneau
4	Bill Ray	Dem	Juneau
5	Frank See	Dem	Hoonah
6	Robert I. Ditman	Dem	Valdez
7	Jalmar M. Kerttula	Dem	Palmer
8	Carl F. Brady	Rep	Anchorage
8	Bernard J. "Pop" Carr, Sr.	Dem	Anchorage
8	Mike Gravel	Dem	Anchorage
8	Gene Guess	Dem	Spenard
8	Earl D. Hillstrand	Dem	Anchorage
8	Joseph P. Josephson	Dem	Anchorage
8	Bruce Kendall	Rep	Anchorage
8	Carl F. Lottsfeldt	Dem	Anchorage
8	William J. Moran	Dem	Anchorage
8	Homer Moseley	Dem	Anchorage
8	M. D. Plotnick	Dem	Anchorage
8	John L. Rader	Dem	Anchorage
8	Charles J. Sassara, Jr.	Dem	Anchorage
8	Ted Stevens	Rep	Anchorage
8	Harold D. Strandberg	Rep	Anchorage
9	Irwin L. Metcalf	Dem	Seward
10	Clem V. Tillion	Rep	Halibut Cove
11	Bill M. Poland	Dem	Kodiak
12	Carl E. Moses	Rep	King Cove
13	Joseph E. McGill	Dem	Dillingham
14	Raymond C. Christiansen	Dem	Bethel
15	Norbert H. Skinner	Dem	Clear
16	Barry W. Jackson	Dem	Fairbanks
16	Walter H. LeFevre	Dem	Fairbanks
16	R. S. McCombe	Dem	Chicken
16	Edmund N. Orbeck	Dem	Fairbanks
16	Robert E. Sheldon	Dem	Fairbanks
16	Warren A. Taylor	Dem	Fairbanks
16	Sigurd Wold	Rep	Fairbanks
17	Jacob A. Stalker	Dem	Kotzebue
18	Thomas J. Balone	Dem	Nome
19	Axel C. Johnson	Dem	Emmonak

=== House leadership ===
- Speaker of the House: Mike Gravel (D-Anchorage)
- Majority Leader: Robert I. Ditman (D-Valdez)
- Minority Leader: William K. Boardman (R-Ketchikan)

=== House committee assignments ===
- Commerce
  - Moseley (chair), Guess, Plotnick, Pinkerton, Hillstrand, Boardman, Brady
- Finance
  - Kerttula (chair), Ray, Balone, Sassara, Jackson, Strandberg, Haugen
- Health, Welfare and Education
  - Pinkerton (chair), Johnson, Metcalf, Sheldon, Plotnick, Rader, Tillion, Moses, Wold
- Judiciary
  - Guess (chair), Josephson, Metcalf, Hillstrand, Taylor, Tillion, Stevens
- Labor and Management
  - See (chair), Orbeck, Josephson, Johnson, McGill, Kendall, Engstrom
- Local Government
  - Poland (chair), O'Connell, Stalker, Lottsfeldt, Rader, Engstrom, Wold
- Resources
  - Christiansen (chair), McCombe, Stalker, Skinner, McGill, Poland, Sheldon, See, Tillion, Moses, Brady
- Rules
  - Taylor (chair), Ditman, LeFevre, Josephson, Carr, Boardman, Kendall
- State Affairs
  - LeFevre (chair), Carr, O'Connell, Lottsfeldt, Skinner, Orbeck, Engstrom, Stevens, Boardman

== See also ==
- List of Alaska State Legislatures
- 3rd Alaska State Legislature, the legislature preceding this one
- 5th Alaska State Legislature, the legislature following this one
- List of governors of Alaska
- List of speakers of the Alaska House of Representatives
- Alaska Legislature
- Alaska Senate
- {AKLeg.gov}
