= List of Alaska State Legislatures =

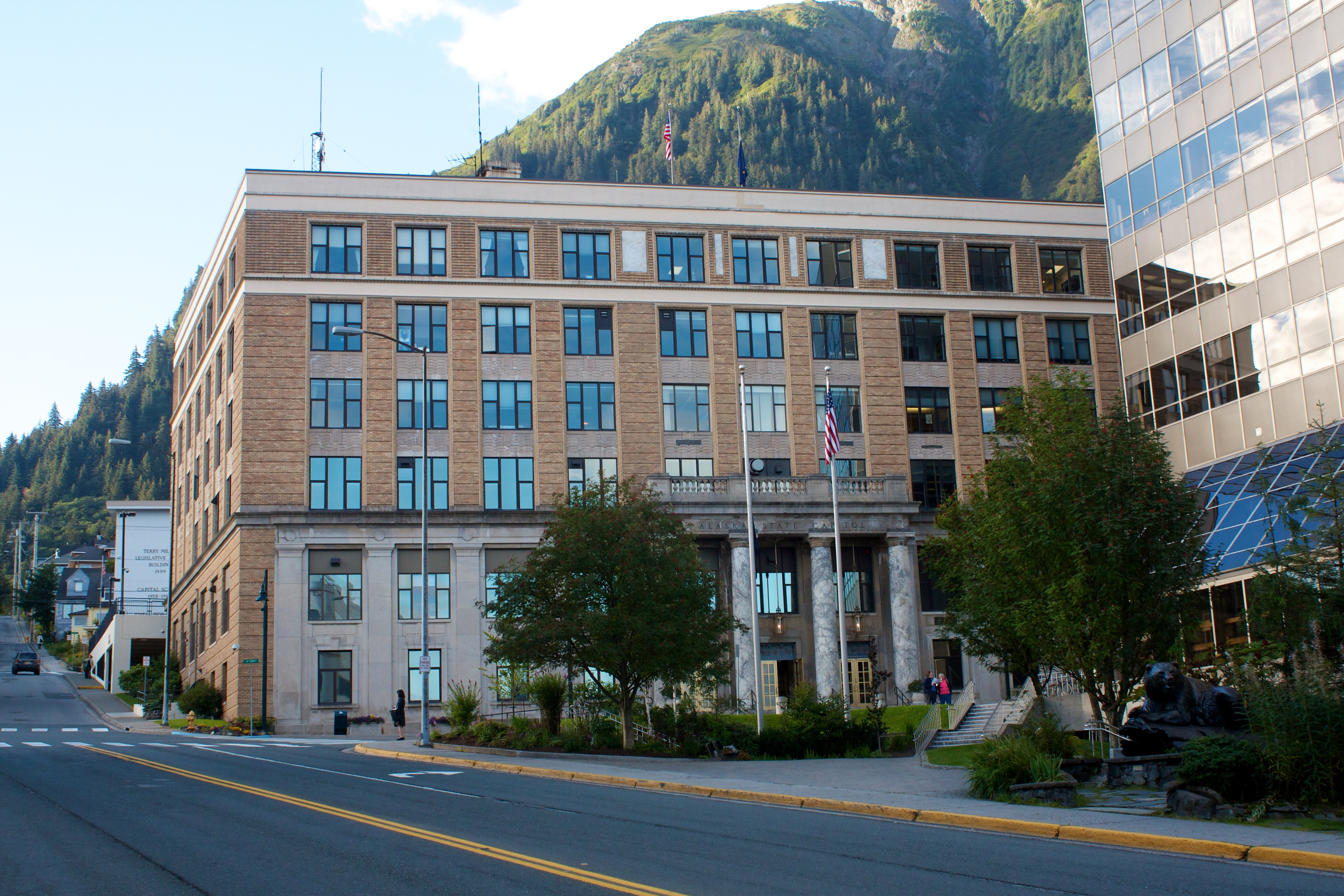
The Alaska State Capitol, with Mount Juneau in the background.

The legislature of the U.S. state of Alaska has convened 34 times since statehood became effective on January 3, 1959.

== Legislatures ==
Legislature	Convened	Adjourned	# of legis- lative days	# of bills introduced	# of bills passed	Last election
First	January 26, 1959	March 29, 1960	146	733	387	November 1958: House, Senate
Second	January 23, 1961	April 12, 1962	155	794	316	November 1960: House
Third	January 28, 1963	May 30, 1964	164	836	231	
Fourth	January 25, 1965	April 17, 1966	159	868	286	
Fifth	January 23, 1967	April 16, 1968	169	1,158	406	
Sixth	January 27, 1969	June 7, 1970	242	1,479	373	
Seventh	January 11, 1971	June 18, 1972	282	1,269	339	
Eighth	January 8, 1973	April 26, 1974	217	1,435	255	
Ninth	January 20, 1975	June 1, 1976	281	1,696	499	
Tenth	January 10, 1977	June 18, 1978	302	1,628	337	
Eleventh	January 15, 1979	June 6, 1980	263	1,629	270	
Twelfth	January 12, 1981	June 3, 1982	312	1,793	264	
Thirteenth	January 17, 1983	June 8, 1984	314	1,276	280	
Fourteenth	January 14, 1985	May 12, 1986	269	1,199	251	
Fifteenth	January 19, 1987	May 10, 1988	246	1,087	274	
Sixteenth	January 9, 1989	May 8, 1990	257	1,159	329	
Seventeenth	January 21, 1991	May 12, 1992	256	1,087	239	
Eighteenth	January 11, 1993	May 10, 1994	252	933	224	
Nineteenth	January 16, 1995	May 8, 1996	273	903	257	
Twentieth	January 13, 1997	May 13, 1998	250	856	256	
Twenty-First	January 19, 1999	May 3, 2000	254	768	236	
Twenty-Second	January 8, 2001	May 16, 2002	256	928	254	
Twenty-Third	January 21, 2003	May 11, 2004	246	968	336	
Twenty-Fourth	January 10, 2005	May 9, 2006	324	846	223	
Twenty-Fifth	January 16, 2007	April 13, 2008	302	745	189	
Twenty-Sixth	January 20, 2009	April 18, 2010	182	739	181	
Twenty-Seventh	January 18, 2011	April 15, 2012	223	596	114	November 2010
Twenty-Eighth	January 15, 2013	April 25, 2014	185	601	189	November 2012
Twenty-Ninth	January 20, 2015	July 18, 2016 (5th Special Session)	314	615	110	November 2014: House, Senate
Thirtieth	January 17, 2017	May 13, 2018	329	628	145	November 2016: House, Senate
Thirty-first	January 15, 2019	May 20, 2020		567	67	November 2018: House, Senate
Thirty-second	January 19, 2021	May 18, 2022		390	37	November 2020: House, Senate
Thirty-third	January 17, 2023	May 19, 2023				November 2022: House, Senate
Thirty-fourth	January 21, 2025	May 15, 2026 (scheduled)				November 2024: House, Senate

== See also ==
- List of speakers of the Alaska House of Representatives
- List of governors of Alaska
- List of lieutenant governors of Alaska
- Alaska Legislature
- Alaska Senate
- Government of Alaska
- Historical outline of Alaska
- Lists of United States state legislative sessions
