= 1958 Alaska Senate election =

1958 Alaska Senate elections
- November 26, 1958

All 20 seats in the Alaska Senate 11 seats needed for a majority
	Majority party	Minority party
Leader	Bill Beltz	—
Party	Democratic	Republican
Leader's seat	N–Unalakleet	—
Seats won	18	2
Popular vote	93,526	43,273
Percentage	65.87%	30.48%
- Results: Democratic gain Republican gain At-large districts: Majority Democratic
Alaska Senate President before election
Office established
Elected Alaska Senate President
Bill Beltz
Democratic

The 1958 Alaska Senate elections were held on November 26, 1958, in Alaska's last days as a territory to elect members of the 1st Alaska State Legislature. All 20 seats of the Senate were up for election, with 18 seats being won by Democrats and two by Republicans.

Bill Beltz from Unalakleet was elected Senate President on January 26, 1959, three weeks after Alaska became the 49th state.

== Results by district ==
Only candidate's last names are listed on the official general election returns.

=== District A ===
District A was an at-large district covering all of the southeastern districts, those being state senate districts B-D and representative districts 1–6. It elected 2 members of the Senate.

1958 Alaska Senate election, District A (2-year seat)
Party	Candidate	Votes	%
Democratic	James Nolan	10,123	71.4
Republican	Leer	4,055	28.6
Total votes		14,178	100.0

1958 Alaska Senate election, District A (4-year seat)
Party	Candidate	Votes	%
Democratic	Frank Peratrovich	7,814	100.0
Total votes		7,814	100.0

=== District B ===
District B covered state representative districts 1–2. The final results returned a tie, so the Democratic state senate resolved the tie by seating Democratic candidate Bo Smith.

1958 Alaska Senate election, District B
Party	Candidate	Votes	%
Democratic	Bo Smith	1,953	50.0
Republican	Boardman	1,953	50.0
Total votes		3,906	100.0

=== District C ===
District C covered state representative districts 3–4.

1958 Alaska Senate election, District C
Party	Candidate	Votes	%
Democratic	Howard C. Bradshaw	1,964	57.2
Republican	Barnes	1,467	42.8
Total votes		3,431	100.0

=== District D ===
District D covered state representative districts 5–6.

1958 Alaska Senate election, District D
Party	Candidate	Votes	%
Democratic	Thomas B. Stewart	2,454	51.2
Republican	Engstrom	2,323	48.6
Total votes		4,777	100.0

=== District E ===
District E was an at-large district covering all of the southcentral districts, those being state senate districts F-I and representative districts 7–14. It elected 2 members of the Senate.

1958 Alaska Senate election, District E (2-year seat)
Party	Candidate	Votes	%
Democratic	Irene E. Ryan	13,978	63.9
Republican	Anderson	7,897	36.1
Total votes		21,875	100.0

1958 Alaska Senate election, District E (4-year seat)
Party	Candidate	Votes	%
Democratic	Ralph E. Moody	13,348	61.2
Republican	Lesh	7,618	34.9
Independent	Lightwood	859	3.9
Total votes		21,825	100.0

=== District F ===
District F covered state representative districts 7–8.

1958 Alaska Senate election, District F
Party	Candidate	Votes	%
Democratic	Bob Logan	855	61.8
Republican	Gilson	528	38.2
Total votes		1,383	100.0

=== District G ===
District G covered state representative districts 9–10.

1958 Alaska Senate election, District G
Party	Candidate	Votes	%
Democratic	Joseph Earl Cooper	8,916	53.3
Democratic	Wolfe	7,210	43.1
Independent	Watkins	414	5.0
Independent	Harris	187	1.1
Total votes		16,727	100.0

=== District H ===
District H covered state representative districts 11–12.

1958 Alaska Senate election, District F
Party	Candidate	Votes	%
Democratic	Irwin L. Metcalf	1,298	52.5
Republican	Nelson	1,173	47.5
Total votes		2,471	100.0

=== District I ===
District I covered state representative districts 13–14.

1958 Alaska Senate election, District I
Party	Candidate	Votes	%
Democratic	Alfred A. Owen	1,024	63.9
Republican	Hinckel	384	24.0
Independent	McCord	161	10.0
Independent	Radinsky	33	2.1
Total votes		1,602	100.0

=== District J ===
District J was an at-large district covering all of the central districts, those being state senate districts K-M and representative districts 15–20. It elected 2 members of the Senate.

1958 Alaska Senate election, District J (2-year seat)
Party	Candidate	Votes	%
Democratic	Robert J. McNealy	6,727	59.2
Republican	Binkley	4,342	38.2
Independent	Butler	293	2.6
Total votes		11,362	100.0

1958 Alaska Senate election, District J (4-year seat)
Party	Candidate	Votes	%
Democratic	George B. McNabb, Jr.	5,963	53.7
Republican	Jones	2,825	25.5
Independent	Noyes	1,874	16.9
Independent	Stuart	439	4.0
Total votes		11,101	100.0

=== District K ===
District K covered state representative districts 15–16.

1958 Alaska Senate election, District K
Party	Candidate	Votes	%
Republican	Jack E. Weise	696	54.8
Independent	Emberg	574	45.2
Total votes		1,270	100.0

=== District L ===
District L covered state representative districts 17–18.

1958 Alaska Senate election, District L
Party	Candidate	Votes	%
Republican	John B. Coghill	1,038	100.0
Total votes		1,038	100.0

=== District M ===
District M covered state representative districts 19–20.

1958 Alaska Senate election, District M
Party	Candidate	Votes	%
Democratic	Hubert A. Gilbert	4,454	51.2
Republican	Wein	3,895	44.8
Independent	Longwith	349	4.0
Total votes		8,698	100.0

=== District N ===
District N was an at-large district covering all of the northwestern districts, those being state senate districts O-P and representative districts 21–24. It elected 2 members of the Senate.

1958 Alaska Senate election, District N (2-year seat)
Party	Candidate	Votes	%
Democratic	Lester Bronson	1,654	58.3
Republican	Johnson	1,184	41.7
Total votes		2,838	100.0

1958 Alaska Senate election, District N (4-year seat)
Party	Candidate	Votes	%
Democratic	William E. Beltz	2,143	75.7
Republican	Frazier	688	24.3
Total votes		2,831	100.0

=== District O ===
District O covered state representative districts 21–22.

1958 Alaska Senate election, District O
Party	Candidate	Votes	%
Democratic	Eben Hopson	571	51.9
Republican	Bullock	530	48.1
Total votes		1,101	100.0

=== District P ===
District P covered state representative districts 23–24.

1958 Alaska Senate election, District P
Party	Candidate	Votes	%
Democratic	John A. McNees	1,077	61.4
Republican	Jones	677	38.6
Total votes		1,754	100.0

== See also ==
- 1st Alaska State Legislature
- 1958 Alaska House of Representatives election
- 1958 United States elections
