= Lester Bronson =

American politician

Lester Daniel Bronson (December 23, 1905 – January 24, 1972) was a Democrat and represented Nome, Alaska as a member of Alaska territorial House of Representatives 2nd District, 1955–56; in the 1st Alaska State Legislature as a Senator 1959–1960; 2nd Alaska State Legislature as a Senator 1961–1962; 3rd Alaska State Legislature 1963–1965 as a Senator and in the 6th Alaska State Legislature as a House Representative from 1969–70.

Bronson was briefly a prize fighter when he was young, which combined with his method of dealing with legislation he believed in resulted in his nickname "the Tiger." Fellow legislator Frank Peratrovich called Bronson "a dedicated Alaskan who played a major role in the development of Nome . . . (and) made a great contribution to the territory and state." and told the paper he was "known as a defender of youth and frequently backed bills against obscene publications and cigarettes." Rep. Clem Tillion, said Bronson was "always genial, always good for a laugh and a feisty little guy." "He was quicker to laugh than complain." Bronson also ran the water system in Nome for years.

Bronson was an alternate delegate to Democratic National Convention from Alaska, 1960. He was also a Lieutenant Colonel in the Alaska Wing Civil Air Patrol. His parents were Daniel D Bronson (born Michigan) and Irene A Geary (born California). About 1925 he married Rose Gray in Nome. He died in January 1972 in his Nome home.
