= Senator Bronson =

Senator Bronson may refer to:

- Alvin Bronson (1783–1881), New York State Senate
- Charles Bronson (politician) (born 1949), Florida State Senate
- Harrison A. Bronson (1873–1947), North Dakota State Senate
- Irlo Bronson Sr. (1900–1973), Florida State Senate
- Lester Bronson (1905–1972), Alaska State Senate
- Stiles H. Bronson (1842–1930), South Dakota State Senate

== See also ==
- Senator Brownson (disambiguation)
