= Pope-Toledo =

Defunct American motor vehicle manufacturer

Pope Motor Car Company Pope-Toledo
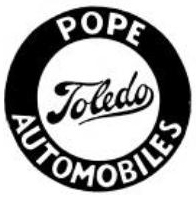
- The Mile-a-Minute Car

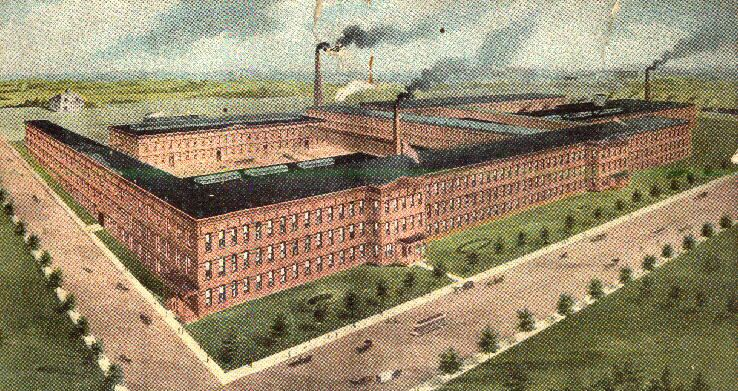
- Pope Motor Car Company factory, Toledo, Ohio
- Formerly: International Motor Car Company
- Industry: Automotive
- Founded: 1903; 123 years ago
- Defunct: 1909; 117 years ago
- Fate: Bankruptcy, factory sold to Overland
- Headquarters: Toledo, Ohio, United States
- Key people: Albert A. Pope
- Products: Automobiles

The Pope-Toledo was the luxury marque of the Pope Motor Car Company founded by Colonel Albert A. Pope, and was a manufacturer of Brass Era automobiles in Toledo, Ohio between 1903 and 1909. The Pope-Toledo was the successor to the Toledo of the International Motor Car Company.

== History ==
Pope-Toledo 1906 emblem

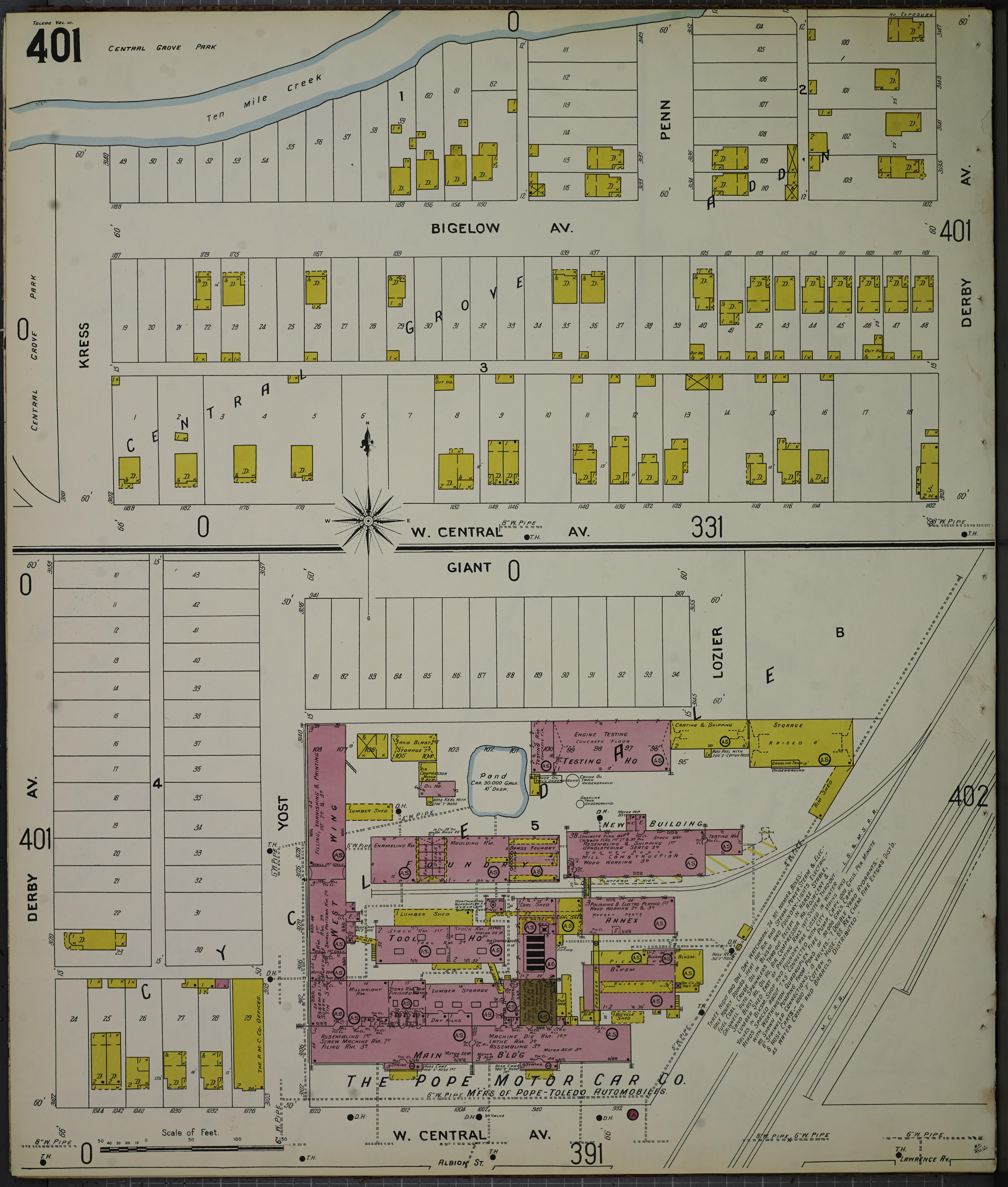
Pope-Toledo Plant (1905)

The 1903 Pope-Toledo was a four-wheel, front-engined, two-seater open car. It was powered by a straight 3 cylinder 182 cubic inch (2983 cc) engine with the then unusual feature of a detachable cylinder head. Valve operation was mechanical and the engine speed was governed at 600 RPM. Drive was through a 3-speed gearbox with chains to each rear wheel. The chassis was mainly wood with a steel sub-frame carrying the main mechanical components. The car had a wheelbase of 7 feet 5 inches (2.26 m) and a track of 4 feet 8 inches (1.42 m). It was entered in the first Vanderbilt Cup (1904), but lost its steering and hit a tree.

The 1904 model was a larger touring car. Equipped with a rear entrance tonneau body, it could seat 5 passengers and sold for $3,500, equivalent to $125,417 in 2025. The vertically mounted water-cooled straight-4, situated at the front of the car, produced 24hp (17.9kW). A 3-speed sliding transmission was fitted. The channel steel-framed car weighed 2350lb (1066kg). This modern Système Panhard car had spark and throttle levers on steering wheel, a novelty at the time.

In 1905, a Pope-Toledo owned by C. Edward Born was driven 828.5 miles before a crowd of 15,000 to win the world's first 24-hour endurance race in Columbus, Ohio. Piloted by brothers George and Charles Soules, the car was protested by runners up as being a special factory-owned "ringer". This protest was rejected by the Columbus Driving Park officials. In 1908, Bobby Sheldon brought a 1906 Pope-Toledo down the Yukon to Fairbanks, the first car brought to Alaska.

By 1907 the company models included limousines and seven seat cars. In 1909 the company was taken over by Richard D. Apperson of the American National Bank of Lynchburg, Virginia (and no relation to Apperson of Kokomo). The Apperson deal failed and the Pope Motor Car Company receivers sold the factory to Overland.

== Production models ==
- Pope-Toledo Type X
- Pope-Toledo Type XII
- Pope-Toledo Type VIII
- Pope-Toledo Type IX
- Pope-Toledo Type XV
- Pope-Toledo Type XVII
- Pope-Toledo Type XVIII
- Pope-Toledo Type XXI
- Pope-Toledo Type XXII

== Gallery ==
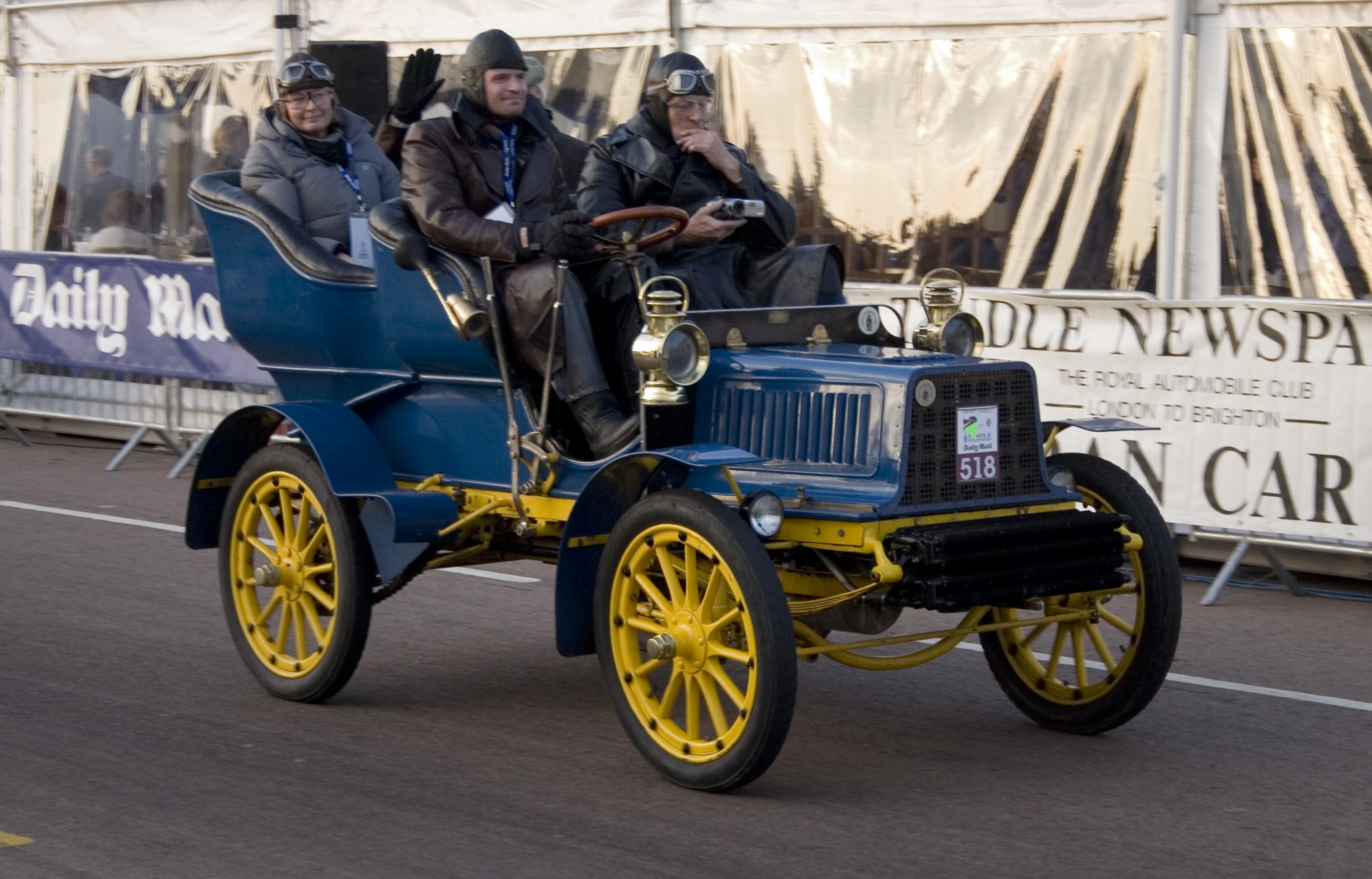
1904 Pope-Toledo Model Rear Entrance Tonneau

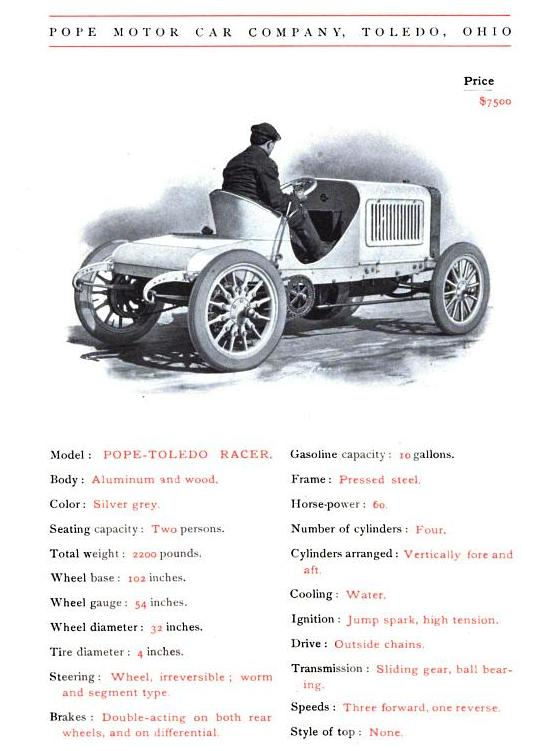
1904 Pope Toledo Racer

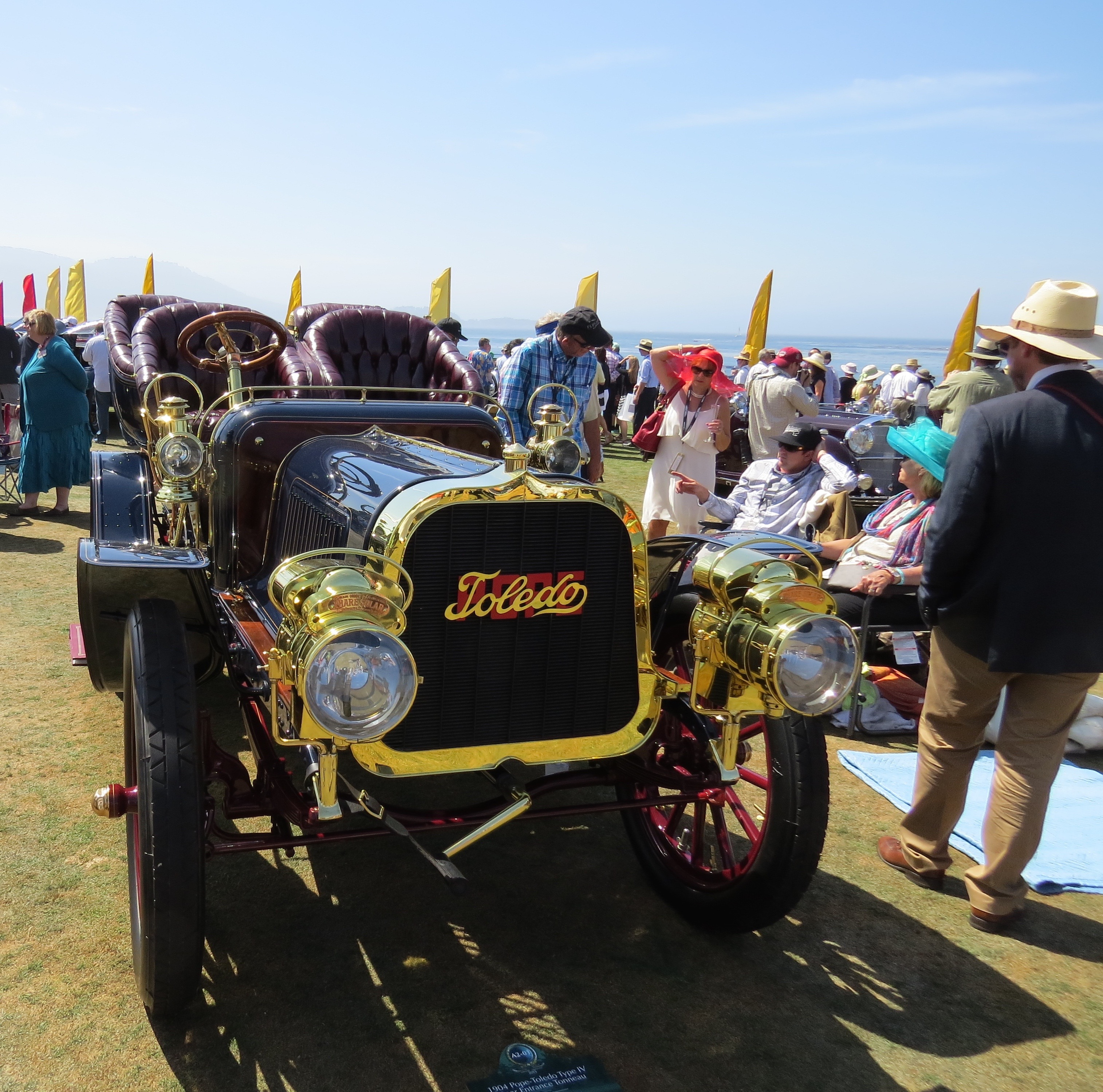
1904 Pope-Toledo Type IV

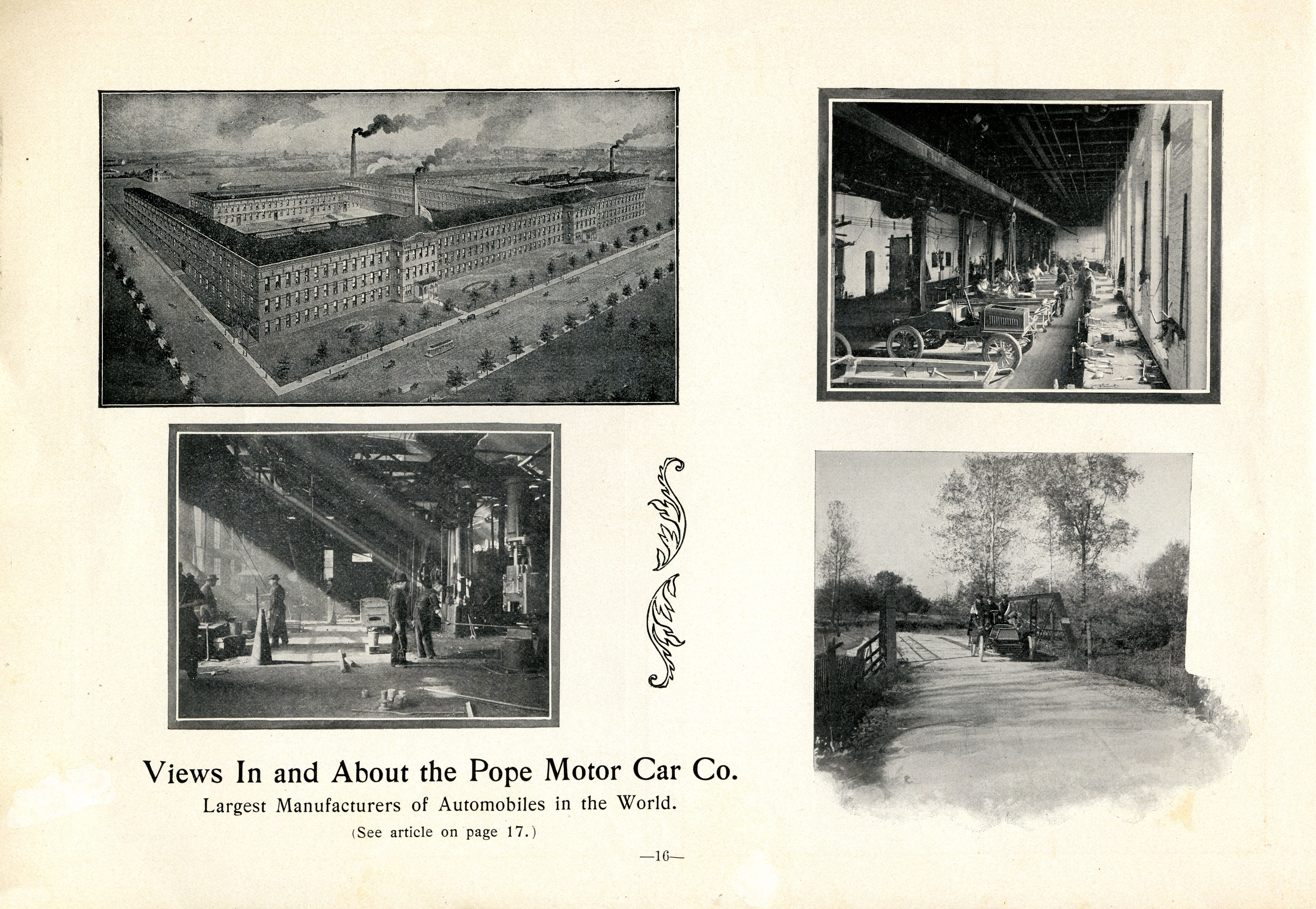
1904 Pope-Toledo Factory

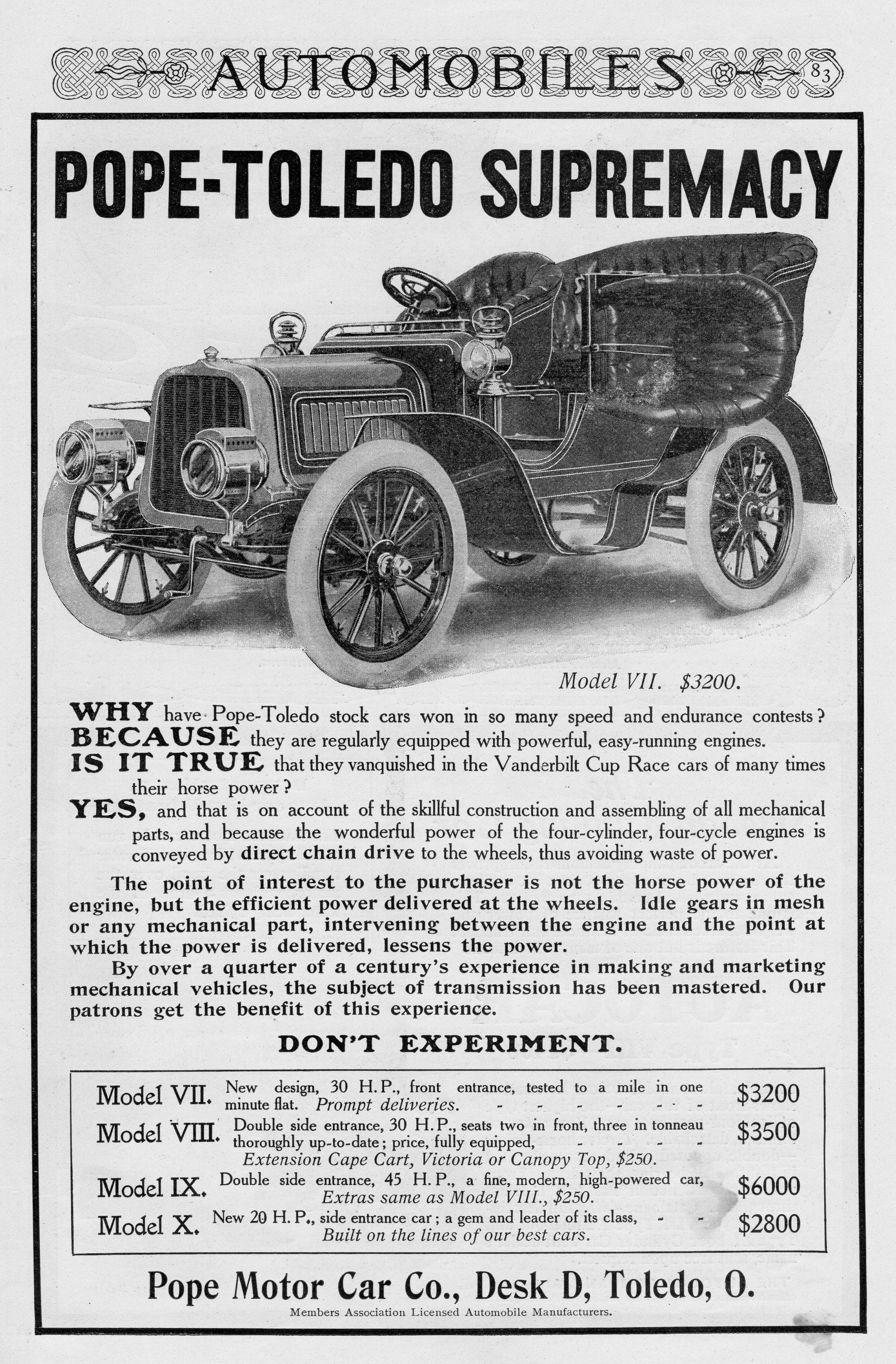
1905 Pope-Toledo Model VII advertisement

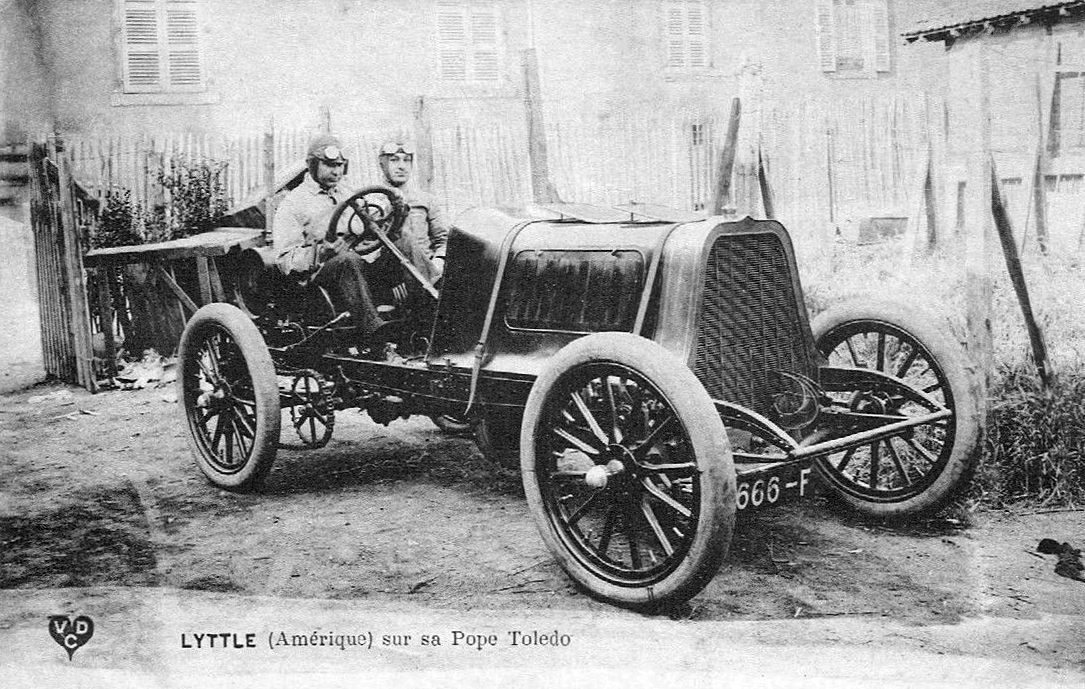
1905 Pope-Toledo with driver Herbert Lytle for the Gordon Bennett Cup

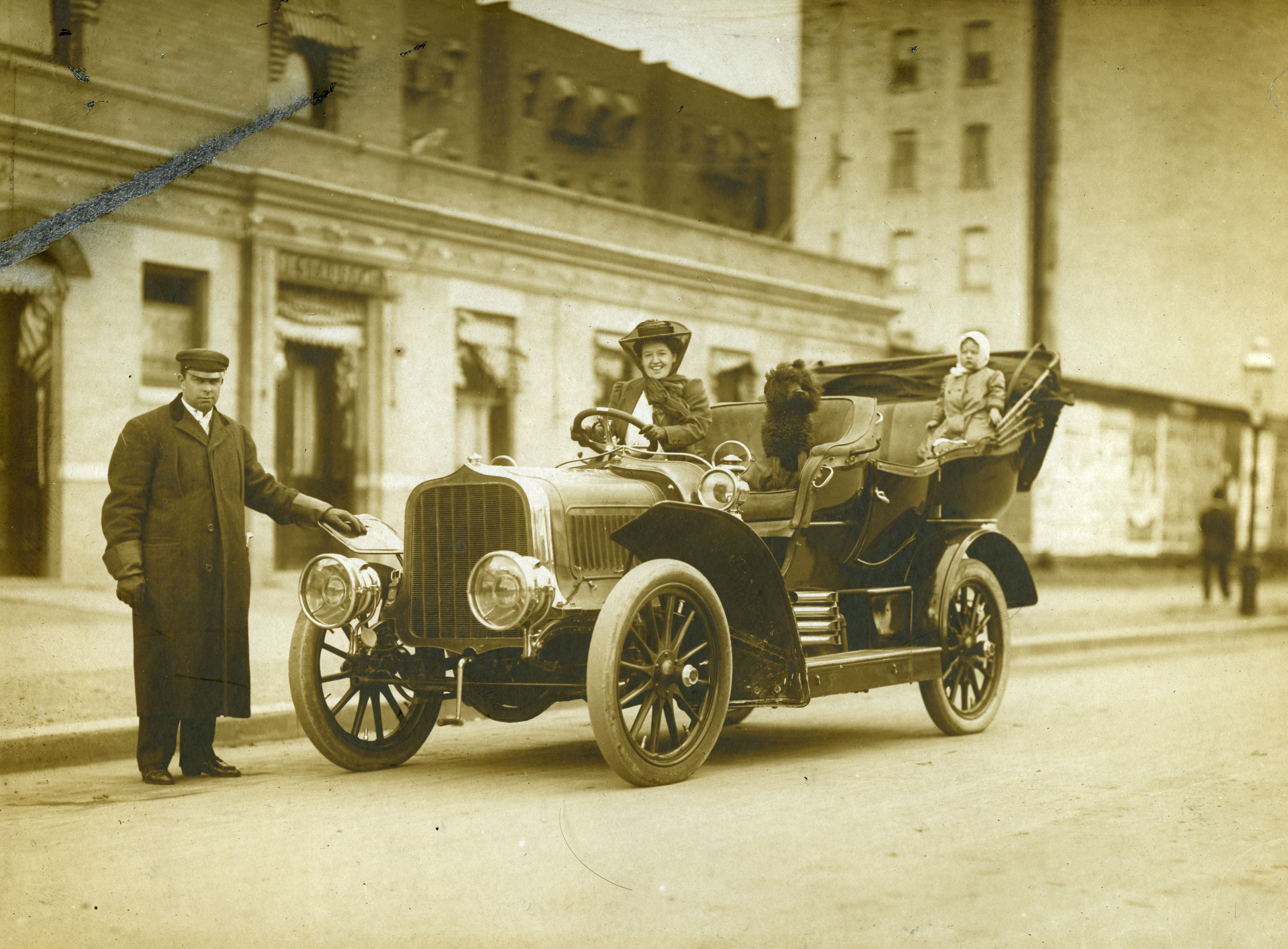
1906 Pope-Toledo Model VI

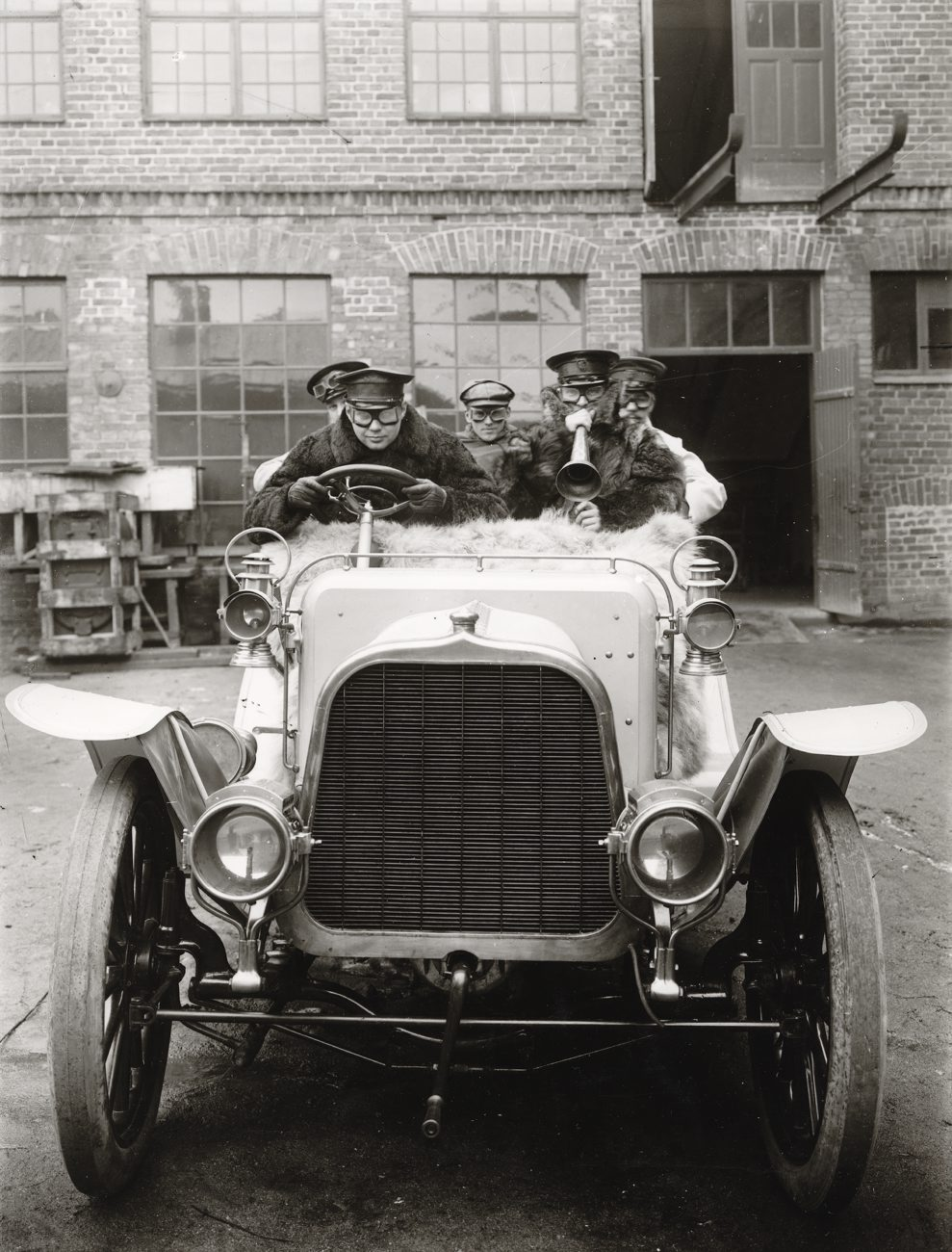
1906 Pope-Toledo VI - Gustaf Ericsson

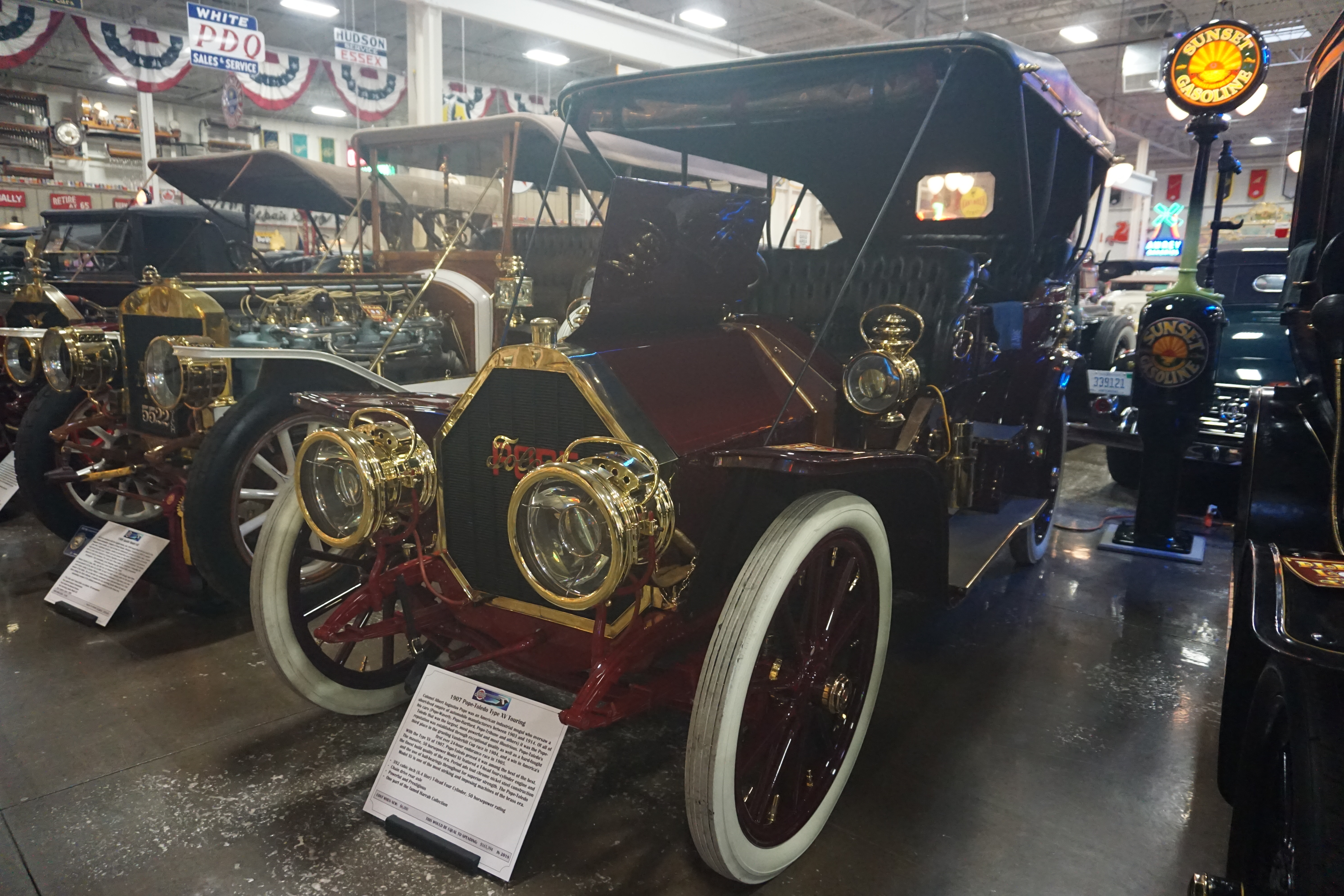
1907 Pope-Toledo Model VII

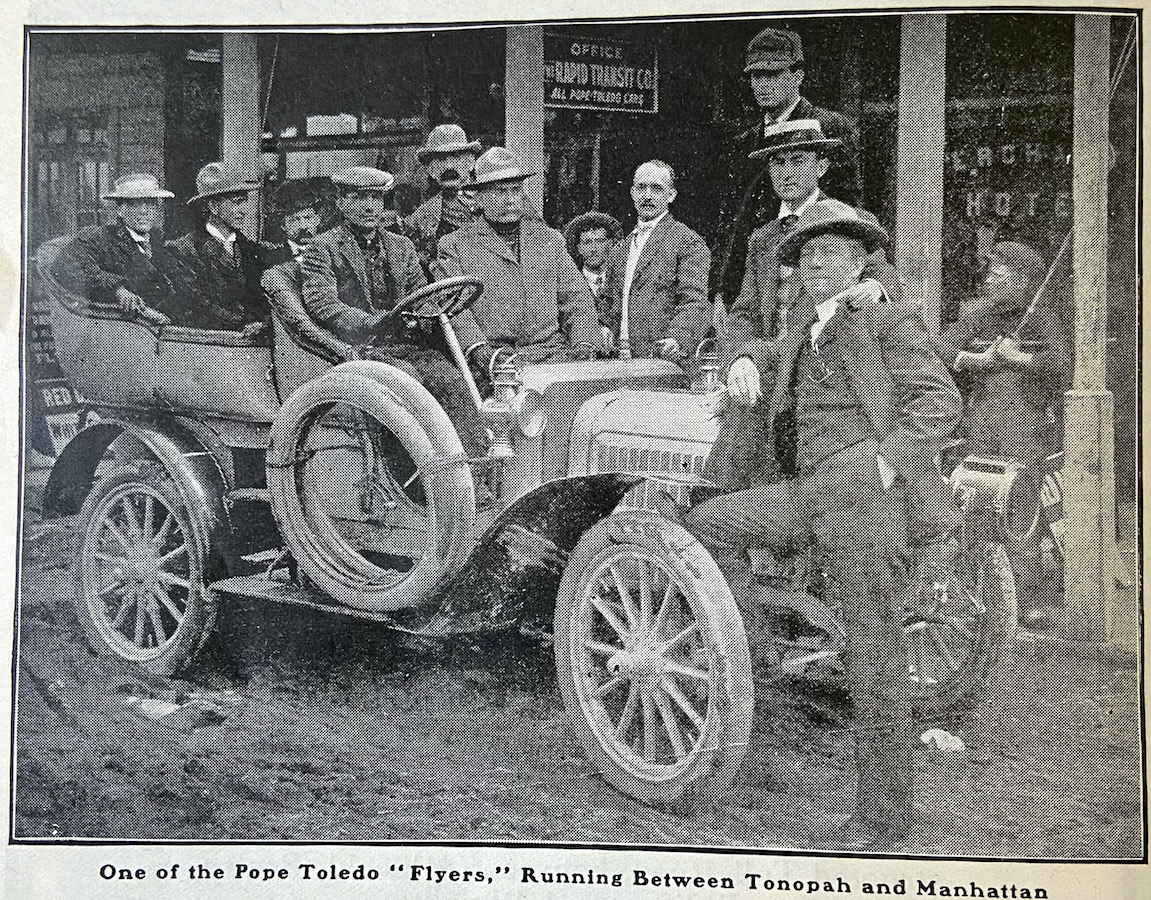
The Nevada Rapid Transit line used multiple Pope-Toledos to take passengers between Tonopah and Manhattan

== See also ==
- Frank Leslie's Popular Monthly (January, 1904)
- Pope-Toledo at ConceptCarz
- Fountainhead Museum - The Toledo - "An Automobile of Quality"
- Toledos Attic Article - Toledos early automobiles
- Bonhams - 1906 Pope-Toledo
- Bonhams - 1904 Pope-Toledo
