= Senator Brownson =

Senator Brownson may refer to:

- John W. Brownson (New York politician) (1807–1860), New York State Senate
- Nathan Brownson (1742–1796), Georgia State Senate

== See also ==
- Senator Bronson (disambiguation)
