= Genie Chance =

American broadcaster and politician

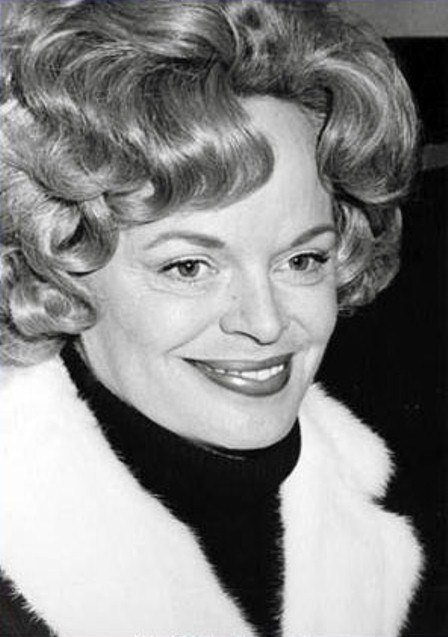

Member of the Alaska House of Representatives from the 7th district (8th district 1969–1973)
- In office January 27, 1969 – January 20, 1975
- Preceded by: Multi-member district
- Succeeded by: Redistricted

Member of the Alaska Senate from the E district
- In office January 20, 1975 – January 10, 1977
- Preceded by: Redistricted
- Succeeded by: Bill Sumner

Personal details
- Born: Emma Gene Broadfoot; January 24, 1927 Dallas, Texas, United States
- Died: May 17, 1998 (aged 71) Juneau, Alaska, United States
- Party: Democratic
- Spouses: Winston C. Chance (m. 1947; div. 1971) William K. Boardman (m. 1971; died 1993)
- Children: Winston Chance Jr., Albert Chance, Jan Chance Blankenship
- Education: North Texas State Teachers College
- Occupation: Journalist, radio broadcaster, politician

Genie Chance (born Emma Gene "Genie" Broadfoot; January 24, 1927 – May 17, 1998) was an American journalist, radio broadcaster, and Alaska state politician. She is most well-known for her coverage of the 1964 Alaska earthquake, which netted her numerous journalism awards, and for her contributions to Alaska legislation.

== Early life ==
Chance was born Emma Gene "Genie" Broadfoot on January 24, 1927, in Dallas County, Texas. Her parents were former Texas state representative and Sixth District Judge Albert Sidney Broadfoot and Jessie Butler Broadfoot of Bonham, Texas. She had one brother, Lt. Albert S. Broadfoot Jr., and two sisters, Jessie Butler Broadfoot Garrett and Alice Virginia Broadfoot Freeman. In 1946, Chance graduated from North Texas State Teachers College (now the University of North Texas) with a degree in Speech, then conducted graduate studies at Baylor University. Chance became an instructor at North Texas State University where she taught speech, radio, English, and government. In 1959, at 32 years old, she moved from Texas to Anchorage, Alaska.

== Broadcast career ==
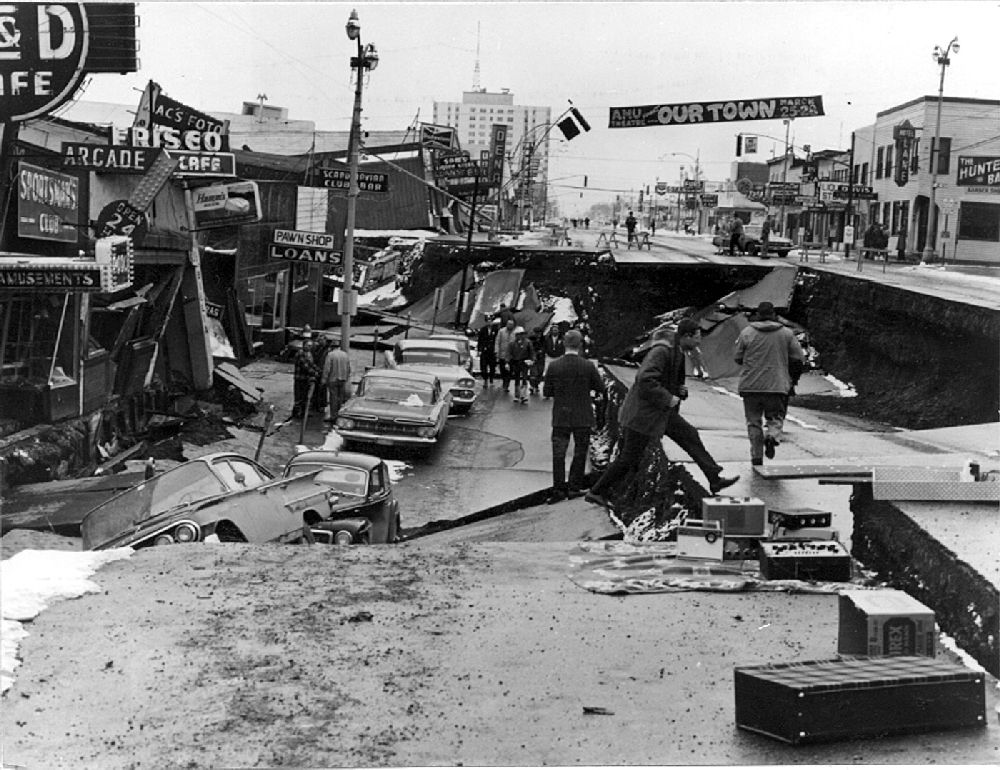
Anchorage's Fourth Avenue after the 1964 Earthquake on March 27, 1964

Following her move to Anchorage in 1959, Chance worked as an editorialist and journalist, first at KENI radio and television and then at KFQD radio, becoming one of the first women in Alaskan broadcast news.

Chance rose to prominence for her calm and measured broadcasting after the 9.2 magnitude 1964 Alaska earthquake. Immediately after the earthquake, Chance made her way to a temporary post in the Alaska Public Safety Building where she started broadcasting information about the catastrophic damage throughout the Anchorage area and shared messages from family members looking for loved ones. Chance urged grocers to open their stores, but cautioned community members against hoarding. After essentially being designated the public information officer by Anchorage police chief John Flanigan, she shared instructions for purifying snow for drinking water, requests from the local hospital for supplies, and pleas from community leaders for electricians and plumbers. Chance would spend the next twenty-four hours almost continuously coordinating response efforts, connecting available resources to needs around the community, disseminating information about shelters and prepared food rations, passing messages of well-being between loved ones, and helping to reunite families. Later, Chance would say that her dedication and calm demeanor was due in part to her responsibility to reassure people that the world had not come to an end.

For her coverage of the earthquake, Chance received numerous awards, including national recognition with the McCall's Golden Mike Award and a number of top Alaska Press Club awards. Chance was also a member of the Alaska Press Women, renamed Alaska Professional Communicators, and served as their president in 1967. She later asked KENI radio for a raise, a request that was denied on the grounds that she was already being paid the maximum salary for a woman in her position. She quit soon after and started her own public relations firm.

== Political career ==
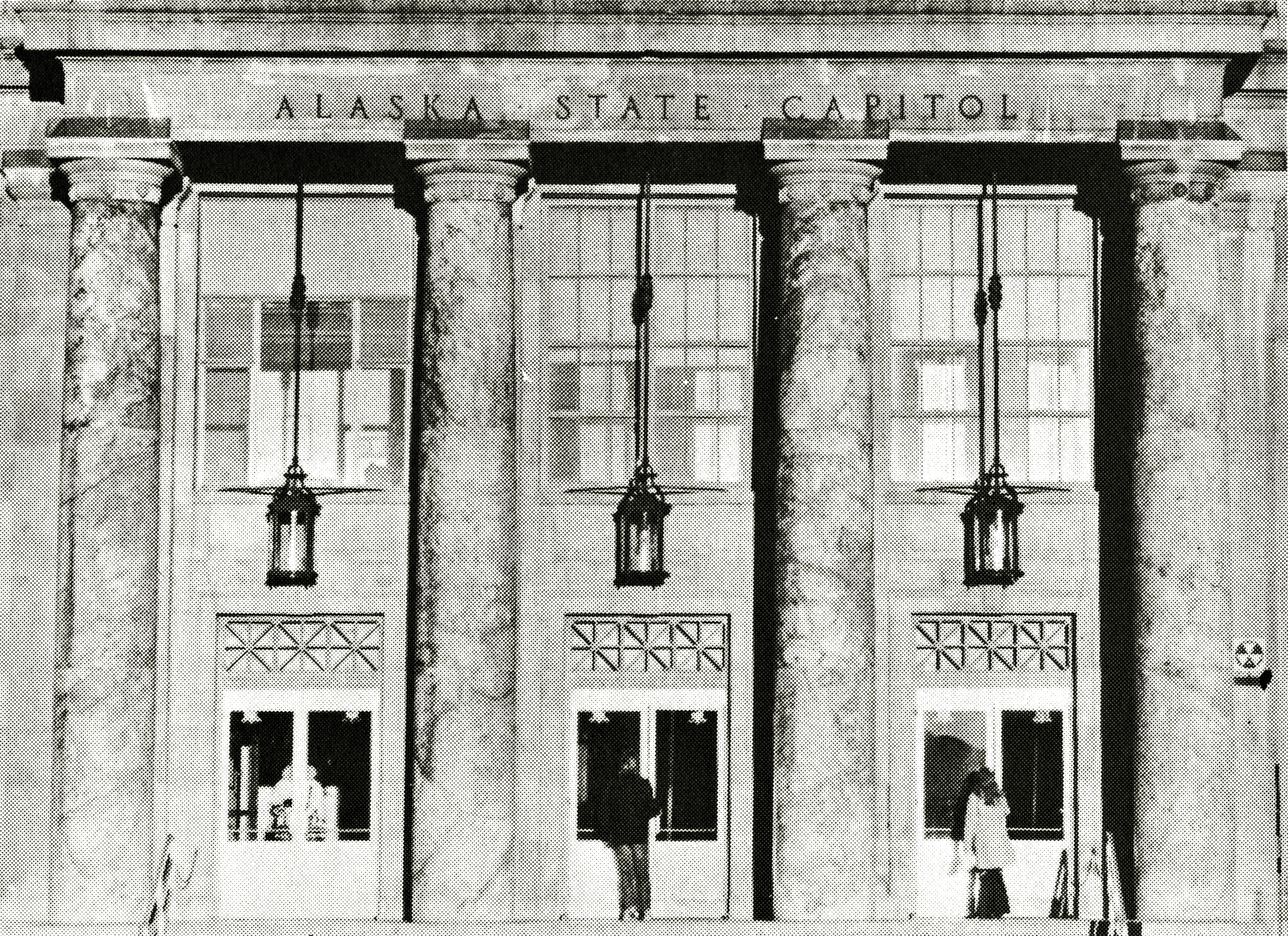
The front entrance of the Alaska State Capitol in Juneau, Alaska (1970s)

Chance was elected to the Alaska House of Representatives in 1968, where she served for three terms, from 1969 to 1975. During this time, two successive redistricting plans drafted by the Alaska Supreme Court transformed Anchorage's legislative delegation from a single district encompassing all of Anchorage, to the six districts created in its 1974 plan. That year, Chance ran for the Alaska Senate for the two-year short term from the new two-member District E, centered on downtown Anchorage and surrounding neighborhoods. As a legislator, Chance introduced and sponsored progressive legislation with a focus on education and women's issues. Before the national legalization of abortion under Roe v. Wade in 1973, Chance was the primary supporter of the 1970 bill to decriminalize abortion in Alaska.

Chance's other major legislative achievements include spearheading the establishment of a statewide university system and a statewide telecommunications system. Chance served as vice chairman and chairman of the House Health Education and Social Services Committee. She was also appointed by the Secretary of Defense to serve on the Defense Department Advisory Committee on Women in Military Service from 1967 to 1970.

== Family life ==
Chance met her first husband, Winston Cash Chance, in the small Texas town where she grew up. They married August 15, 1947 in Denton, TX. Together, they had two sons, Albert and Winston Jr., and a daughter, Jan. Winston was a struggling used car salesman, and their financial troubles weighed heavy on their marriage, especially on Genie. Winston moved his family to Alaska in 1959, convinced it was the land of opportunity. While most women at the time were housewives, Genie became increasingly burdened by her urge to contribute financially when it became clear Winston would be unable to pay their rent. With Winston's agreement and permission, she went downtown and quickly got hired on as a reporter at KENI radio. Winston was, at first, supportive of her work and proud of her achievements. Triggered by alcohol, he had been an abusive husband for years, but it became worse as his resentment of his wife's success grew in the aftermath of the earthquake, and it finally led to their divorce.

On September 23, 1971, she married William K. Boardman, former Speaker of the House (1968–69), with whom she had served in the Alaska House of Representatives. They had married despite the fact that she was a prominent member of the Democratic Party in Alaska while Boardman was a Republican. Together, they moved to Juneau, Alaska in 1986, where Chance stayed active in her political endeavors, and remained married until Boardman's death in 1993. Chance had been gathering materials to write her autobiography but succumbed to dementia and died May 17, 1998, at age 71, in Juneau, Alaska.

== Legacy ==
Chance's legislative papers and files for the years between 1969 and 1976 are housed with the Archives and Special Collections at the UAA/APU Consortium Library. Included are subject files on important policies during Chance's years in the legislator such as abortion, Atomic Energy Commission, education, health and welfare, petroleum development, Alaska Children's Services, and FCC Regulation.

In 2016 and 2017, Chance was the subject of a spoken-word performance presented by author Jon Mooallem as part of Radiotopia Live. The performance included a spoken story of Chance's contributions after the 1964 earthquake and featured musicians including Jenny Conlee, Chris Funk, Nate Query, and John Moen. The podcast 99% Invisible recorded a performance and aired the edited version during one of their programs. Mooallem expanded the performance into a book that was released on March 24, 2020. This is Chance! explores Chance's role in helping the community recover in the aftermath of the earthquake.
