= James Nolan (politician) =

American politician (1901–1991)

Member of the Alaska Senate from District A
- In office January 26, 1959 – January 23, 1967 Serving with Frank Peratrovich

21st President of the Alaska Senate
- In office January 24, 1955 – January 28, 1957
- Preceded by: Charles D. Jones
- Succeeded by: Victor Rivers

Member of the Alaska Senate from the 1st district
- In office January 22, 1951 – January 26, 1959 Serving with Doris Barnes (1953–1957)

Member of the Alaska House of Representatives from the 1st district
- In office January 27, 1947 – January 22, 1951 Serving with Doris Barnes (1949–1951)

Personal details
- Born: June 23, 1901 Boston, Massachusetts, U.S.
- Died: October 24, 1991 (aged 90) Wrangell, Alaska, U.S.
- Party: Democratic
- Spouse: Elsie Sylvester (m. 1925; died 1983)
- Parent(s): John J. Nolan; Mary Ringrose
- Education: University of Alaska Southeast (Honorary doctorate)
- Profession: Politician, businessman

James A. Nolan (June 23, 1901 – October 24, 1991) was an American politician and businessman who served several terms in the Alaska Legislature, representing Wrangell, Alaska, as a Democrat. He served as the 21st president of the Alaska Senate from 1955 to 1957. He was the first person in the history of the Alaska Legislature to serve a consecutive tenure of 20 years, spanning the territorial and early statehood eras.

== Early life and education ==
Nolan was born on June 23, 1901 in Boston, Massachusetts, where he attended high school. He received an honorary doctorate from the University of Alaska Southeast in 1983.

In 1920, Nolan became a resident of Alaska at the age of 19.

== Career ==
Nolan served in the Alaska House of Representatives from 1947 to 1951, representing the 1st legislative district of Alaska as a Democrat in the 18th and 19th territorial legislatures. (Note: According to the University of Alaska System, Nolan became Speaker of the House in 1949. However, this title actually belonged to Stanley McCutcheon.)

Nolan subsequently served in the Alaska Senate until 1967, representing the 1st legislative district of Alaska in the 20th, 21st, 22nd, and 23rd territorial legislatures, as well as District A of Alaska in the 1st, 2nd, 3rd, and 4th state legislatures. He was elected the 21st president of the Alaska Senate in 1955; he served until 1957.

Nolan was a delegate at the Alaska constitutional convention.

Outside the Alaska Legislature, Nolan was a member of the Wrangell City Council, a chairman of the Selective Service Board, and president of the Wrangell Chamber of Congress.

In 1967, Nolan was appointed to the Board of Regents to succeed John Conway. His term expired in 1973.

Outside of politics, Nolan worked as a commercial fisherman during summers. He was also a U.S. Deputy Marshal in his community from 1934 to 1935.

== Personal life and death ==
Nolan married Elsie Sylvester in 1925. He was a member of The Elks.

Nolan was a Catholic.

Nolan died at the age of 90 in Wrangell on October 24, 1991.

== Notes ==
Alaska House of Representatives
Preceded by —	Member of the Alaska House of Representatives from the 1st district 1947–1951; Served alongside: Doris Barnes (1949–1951)	Succeeded by —
Alaska Senate
Preceded by —	Member of the Alaska Senate from the 1st district 1951–1959; Served alongside: Doris Barnes (1953–1957)	Succeeded by —
Alaska Senate
Preceded by Charles D. Jones	President of the Alaska Senate; 1955–1957	Succeeded by Victor Rivers
Alaska Senate
Preceded by —	Member of the Alaska Senate from District A 1959–1967; Served alongside: Frank Peratrovich	Succeeded by —
