= Charles M. Jones (Alaska politician) =

American politician

1st Representative of the Alaska House of Representatives, District 1
- In office January 26, 1959 – January 22, 1961
- Preceded by: District Created
- Succeeded by: Alfred E. Widmark

Personal details
- Born: Charles Meredith Jones; December 1, 1921
- Died: March 6, 2002 (aged 80)
- Party: Democratic

Charles Meredith Jones (December 1, 1921 – March 6, 2002) was an Alaskan politician representing Alaska's 1st District from January 26, 1959 – January 22, 1961.

== Life ==
Charles was born on December 1, 1921. He came to the Territory of Alaska in 1942 with the United States Coast Guard. He settled in Craig, where he operated a general store in conjunction with his wife's family. He died on March 6, 2002, at the age of 80.

== Politics ==
He represented the 1st district in the Alaska House of Representatives from 1959 to 1961 during the 1st Alaska State Legislature. He lost reelection in 1960 to Republican Alfred Widmark. They were the district's only representatives, as it was eliminated in the 1961 redistricting.
