= Segundo Llorente =

American politician (1906–1989)

Segundo Llorente Villa SJ (November 18, 1906 – January 26, 1989) was a Spanish Jesuit, philosopher and author who spent 40 years as a missionary among the Yup'ik in the most remote parts of Alaska. In 1960, he won a seat in the 2nd Alaska State Legislature as a write-in candidate, becoming the state's first Catholic priest elected to office, as well as one of two write-in candidates elected that year from rural Alaska. He wrote hundreds of essays and one dozen autobiographical books in Spanish and English about his life in Alaska. Llorente is called the "favorite son" of his hometown, Mansilla Mayor.

== Early life in Spain ==
=== Childhood and youth ===
Segundo Llorente Villa was born on November 18, 1906, in Mansilla Mayor, a little town in the Province of León in northwestern Spain. He was the eldest of nine children in the family of Luis Llorente and Modesta Villa, who were farmers. When he was 13 years old, he entered the diocesan seminary of León. He felt called to the Society of Jesus and in 1923, at age 17, began his novitiate in the Jesuit seminary of Carrión de los Condes in the province of Palencia. This seminary would also educate his brother Amando, a Jesuit who became a teacher and mentor to Fidel Castro, and later was a chaplain and director of spiritual services for the U.S. Army in Miami.

=== Missionary vocation ===
During his novitiate years, Llorente's devotion to his chosen career solidified. Young and passionate, he became obsessed with the Territory of Alaska which, by his own accounts, was considered the most isolated, difficult, and challenging of all Catholic missions. His superiors recommended his appointment to a mission in Anqing, China, but he refused. Thus, he had to wait.

While studying humanities and Latin at Salamanca (1926) and philosophy in Granada (1927), he entered into deep religious and philosophical discussions. Finally in 1930, at age 24, he received permission to go to Alaska due to his determination and persistence.

== Life in the United States ==
=== Education ===
After arriving in America, Llorente attended Gonzaga University, a Jesuit institution in Spokane, Washington, to learn English. Becoming proficient, he began teaching at Gonzaga Preparatory School in the same city. He started writing his first articles at the same time, which were published in the religious journal Century Mission.

In 1931, he studied theology at St. Mary's College in Kansas. In June 1934, at age 28, he became an ordained Roman Catholic priest and traveled to Alma, California, where he continued his religious studies at the former Alma College as well as at Santa Clara University.

=== In the "Arctic Circle" ===
In the fall of 1935, Llorente arrived in Alaska. His first mission was at Akulurak, on the south bank of the Yukon River Delta near the Bering Sea coast. It was here that he first experienced difficulties in the frozen arctic tundra, since not only did he have to learn the extremely difficult dialects of the Yup'ik language, but he had to introduce the concept of God to people with a psychology and conception of the world radically different from Europeans. However, these were exactly the challenges that had attracted him to Alaska in the first place. In this missionary posting, Llorente traveled along the Kuskowkim River drainage, where he served in Bethel and as far upriver as McGrath.

In 1938, he was assigned to the far north mission of Kotzebue, on the end of the Baldwin Peninsula in Kotzebue Sound. In 1941, he returned to Akulurak and was named Superior, where he served until 1948. Llorente served numerous remote parishes based in Bethel during the next three years, returning to the Akulurak district in 1951. After 21 years in Alaska, in 1956, he became a U.S. citizen in Nome.

Most of Llorente's best known stories about experiences in Akulurak, Alakanuk, Bethel, and Kotzebue are recounted in his books Memoirs of a Yukon Priest and Cuarenta años en el círculo Polar ("Forty Years in the Arctic Circle"). In October 1952, he was honored by being selected to attend the Third Congress of Missions in Monterrey, Mexico, which is discussed in his book Trineos y eskimales ("Sleds and Eskimos").

=== State representative ===
Father Segundo Llorente

Member of the Alaska House of Representatives from the 24th district
- In office January 23, 1961 – January 27, 1963
- Preceded by: Axel C. Johnson
- Succeeded by: (as the 19th District); Axel C. Johnson

In 1958, the Territory of Alaska became the 49th state of the United States by virtue of the passage of the Alaska Statehood Act by the U.S. Congress. The results of the already-conducted territorial primary elections (described by Alaskan historian R. N. DeArmond as "the lost primary") were abandoned and elections for state offices were called by territorial governor Mike Stepovich, who resigned from office to launch a campaign for the U.S. Senate, challenging eventual winner Ernest Gruening. Under President Dwight D. Eisenhower, statehood was officially proclaimed on January 3, 1959, which was also the first day of the 86th United States Congress.

The second elections for state offices occurred in 1960. Fr. Llorente was already serving his community in a minor function in the remote Wade Hampton electoral district where 90% of the population was Eskimo. Given the great affection that he had for Native Alaskans, they set out to elect him as their state representative as a write-in candidate rather than one of the candidates promoted by the state political parties.

Upon Fr. Llorente's surprising election, his religious superiors accepted his election after reviewing his mission, and he became the first Catholic priest elected to a state legislature. His term of office coincided with the term of John F. Kennedy, the first Catholic president of the United States, and there was speculation about influence by the Roman Catholic hierarchy, however, nothing came of it. Llorente's election was eventually recognized as one of the first occasions where the political desires of Native Alaskans became reality. The entire tumultuous episode was followed by the Associated Press and Time magazine, which spread news about his election around the world.

=== Later career and death ===
Fr. Llorente returned to Spain only once, in 1963, on a trip designed to encourage vocations in the priesthood. He wrote twelve books about Alaska throughout his life, all but one in Spanish, although he was perfectly fluent in English. (He could converse in Yupik, however he said it never amounted to more than "patter".) His final assignments took him to posts in Nome, Cordova, and Anchorage. He retired at age 68, in 1975, after 40 years of service to the Alaska missions, and was transferred to Moses Lake, Washington, where he worked with the local Hispanic community. He became assistant pastor at St. Joseph's Church in Pocatello, Idaho, in 1981, and three years later, he was chaplain at St. Joseph's Hospital in Lewiston, Idaho.

Llorente died at Jesuit House in Spokane, Washington on January 26, 1989, at age 82 and was buried in a Native American cemetery in De Smet, Idaho, where he was interred by request on January 30, 1989.

== Bibliography ==
Llorente wrote hundreds of deeply moving and engaging essays with unusual cheerfulness about his challenging religious vocation in extremely frigid and difficult conditions. In letters and articles, he described the day-to-day lives and stories of Eskimo peoples that were published in mission journals, mainly in the now defunct "Century Mission." Selected articles were later compiled, which led to the publication of autobiographical books in both Spanish and English.

Cuarenta años en el círculo Polar ("Forty Years in the Arctic Circle"), his best known work, is an anthology of his previous books. It was compiled by Fr. José A. Mestre, who also was a Jesuit. In the volume's prologue and epilogue, his brother Fr. Amando Llorente called him "Hercules of God and the Missions" (Hércules de Dios y de las Misiones) who was happy to be a priest that would not keep anything from God.

Fr. Segundo Llorente's books include:

- Memoirs of a Yukon Priest, Washington, DC: Georgetown University Press, 1990, ISBN 0-87840-494-5
- En el país de los eternos hielos: Alaska boreal ("In the Land of Perpetual Ice: Boreal Alaska"), 1939
- En las lomas del Polo Norte ("In the Hills of the North Pole"), 1942, 1956
- De la desembocadura del Yukon ("From the Mouth of the Yukon"), 1948, 1964
- Chronicas Akulurakeñas—continuacion de la desembocadura del Yukon ("Akulurak Chronicles—continuation of 'From the Mouth of the Yukon'"), 1948
- A orillas del "Kusko" ("On the Banks of the 'Kusko'"), 1951
- Aventuras del círculo Polar ("Arctic Circle Adventures"), 1951, 1952
- En las costas del mar de Bering ("On the Coast of the Bering Sea"), 1953
- Trineos y eskimales—entre Alaska y México, 1952–1956 ("Sleds and Eskimos—Between Alaska and Mexico, 1952–1956"), 1957
- 28 años en Alaska ("28 Years in Alaska"), 1963
- Cuarenta años en el círculo Polar. Antología. ("Forty Years in the Arctic Circle. Anthology"), compiled by Amando Llorente S.J. & José Ángel Mestre, Ediciones Sígueme, 1990, ISBN 978-84-301-1107-7
