= Bobby Sheldon =

American politician

- Born: Robert Edwards Sheldon Jr. June 3, 1883; Snohomish, Washington
- Died: January 4, 1983 (aged 99); Fairbanks, Alaska
- Occupations: Businessman, politician
- Spouse: Anne Bergman
- Children: 1

Representative, Alaska Territorial Legislature
- In office 1925–1926

Representative, Alaska Territorial Legislature
- In office 1927–1928

Representative, 1st Alaska State Legislature
- In office 1959–1961

Representative, 4th Alaska State Legislature
- In office 1965–1967

Robert Edwards Sheldon Jr. (June 3, 1883 – January 4, 1983) was an American automobile enthusiast, businessman, government official and politician. As a boy, Sheldon accompanied his father to Alaska during the Klondike Gold Rush and remained there the rest of his life. He built the first automobile in Alaska, was the first to drive an automobile from Fairbanks to Valdez, and championed the construction of roads in Alaska as the state road commissioner. Sheldon served in two sessions of the Alaska Territorial Legislature and two terms in the Alaska State Legislature. He was variously a power company engineer, the postmaster for Fairbanks, the general manager for the Mt. McKinley Tourist & Transportation Company, and the executive director of the Unemployment Compensation Commission of Alaska.

== Early life ==
Robert Edwards Sheldon Jr. was born June 3, 1883, in Snohomish, Washington. The year after his mother died, Bobby and his father joined the gold rush in Alaska, travelling by steamship from Seattle and arriving in Skagway in December, 1897.

They worked on the road being built through White Pass until the company went bankrupt. While climbing Chilkoot Pass, Sheldon's father had a heart attack and decided to travel to Oregon. Bobby, then 15-years-old, stayed alone in Alaska and supported himself by buying newspapers from Seattle for 5 cents each plus 2 cents each for shipping, and selling them in Skagway for 25 cents. Sheldon was a witness to the shooting of the infamous Soapy Smith on July 8, 1898. In 1899, he learned that his father had died and he stopped using "Junior" as part of his name. Sheldon only found one gold nugget during his time in the Klondike, which he had set into a ring.

Wilds P. Richardson hired Sheldon to help build a dock at Haines. In 1905, Sheldon joined the Northwest Light and Power Company as an engineer.

== Automobiles ==
Sheldon had never seen an actual automobile, only pictures, but in 1905 he decided to build his own to compete for the affection of a young woman whose other suitor carted her around in a fancy horse-drawn carriage. Sheldon built his automobile from any parts he could scavenge: scraps of tin, mining lamps, bits from porter carts, seats from barstools, and a marine engine from a sunken boat. Later known as "The Sheldon", his vehicle won "most original entry" in the local 4 July parade. Years later, when a reporter asked if he married the young woman, Sheldon said "No, but three other fellows have since then." The Sheldon was donated to the collection of University of Alaska Museum of the North; as of September, 2021, it is on loan to the Fountainhead Antique Auto Museum.

Sheldon moved to Fairbanks in 1908 as the manager of the Northern Commercial Company power plant. In 1908, he brought a 1906 Pope-Toledo down the Yukon to Fairbanks.

In 1913, Sheldon imported the first Model T Ford to Alaska; it travelled by rail to Seattle, then was carried by boat to Skagway. From Skagway, it was carried by train on the White Pass and Yukon Route to Whitehorse. A boat carried it down the Yukon River, then the Tanana River, and finally down the Chena River to Fairbanks. With railroad, ocean, and river freight costs added on, the 1913 Model T that sold for $390 cost Sheldon $1,297.

While on vacation, Sheldon used his car to transport people from rural areas into town, saving them a trip in a buckboard wagon pulled by horses that would usually take them several days. Since they insisted on paying him, he ended his vacation having earned $1,500 and with an idea of making money from automobiles. The Alaskan territory at this time had only a few miles of gravel and dirt roads; horses and dog teams used the hundreds of miles of dirt trails. Sheldon determined to drive his new car the distance of the Fairbanks-Valdez trail. When the power plant declined to extend his vacation, Sheldon quit his job, believing that he could establish a regular auto stage line if his venture was successful. Sheldon and three passengers left Fairbanks with a banner proclaiming "Valdez or Bust" at 10:30 p.m. on July 29, 1913.

By 7:30 a.m. the following day, Sheldon reached Richardson, 73 miles from Fairbanks. The vehicle crossed the Tanana river on a cable-controlled scow ferry. Sheldon had to detour from the trail in some locations due to slides and washouts, and used a block and tackle to get across several obstacles. They reached Gulkana the morning of August 1. During the last section of the trip, between Chitina and Valdez, a river had washed over part of the trail. While Sheldon drove, his passengers walked in front of the vehicle with a shovel to test that they were staying on the trail. Sheldon completed the 370-mile trip in 59 hours at 11:00 p.m. on August 2, 1913. Sheldon then sold the car to a man in Valdez for $1,300 and returned to Fairbanks by bicycle and horseback.

Sheldon brought in more Model Ts and started Sheldon's Auto-Stage Line. He ran Sheldon's Auto-Stage Line (later called the Richardson Highway Transportation Company) from 1913 to 1926, operating 15 Model T automobiles. When passengers asked about insurance, they were assured that anyone killed on the trip would be buried free. One of Sheldon's passengers was bush pilot Carl Ben Eielson. After Eielson took the wheel and ran the vehicle at full speed (20 miles per hour) over bumps and culverts, Sheldon advised him to stick to flying airplanes. In 1921, Sheldon attempted to cross Gunnysack Creek in a Model T, but the water was deeper than he expected. Sheldon made it safely ashore while the car floated down the creek into the Delta River, for which he was kidded for several years after.

Sheldon sold his share of the transportation company in 1926 as competition from the newly completed Alaska Railroad attracted more passengers. The motorized stage route that Sheldon popularized became Alaska Route 1. Years later, as Alaska's Road Commissioner, Sheldon pursued improvements to the Valdez Trail, which is now the Richardson Highway.

== Later career ==
In 1925, Sheldon became the on-site manager for the Mt. McKinley Tourist and Transportation Company, which worked with the National Park Service, the Alaska Railroad, and the Alaska Road Commission, providing camping and tourism services within Mt. McKinley National Park. He lived at Savage Camp, maintaining a fleet of vehicles and transporting guests into the park. Sheldon was a passenger on the first official flight through Mt. McKinley National Park on July 12, 1930. Sheldon resigned from the tourist company in 1933 and was appointed postmaster of Fairbanks by President Roosevelt. In 1935, he chatted with Will Rogers at the Fairbanks Post Office just hours before Rogers's death. He was also the president of the Chamber of Commerce in Fairbanks. In 1940, he returned to the Mt. McKinley Tourist and Transportation Company.

Sheldon served as Road Commissioner for the 4th Division for four years. He was elected to the territorial legislature for the 1925 and 1927 sessions. After Alaska gained statehood in 1959, Sheldon was elected to the House of Representatives in the first state legislature. While serving as the executive director of the Unemployment Compensation Commission of Alaska, Sheldon attended the 1943 Interstate Conference of Employment Security Agencies in Louisville, Kentucky, his first trip outside of Alaska in 46 years. He retired from the Alaska Employment Security commission in 1951. Sheldon represented District 19 as a Democrat in the 1959 House of Representatives Sheldon served on the Planning and Zoning Commission for Fairbanks from 1962 to 1963.

== Personal life and death ==
On August 20, 1922, Sheldon married Anne Bergman, who had moved from Everett, Washington to Fairbanks with her family in 1910. They had one daughter, Frances, who was born in Fairbanks. Anne died November 18, 1973, in Seattle, Washington. Sheldon spent the last years of his life in the Fairbanks Pioneers' Home and died January 4, 1983. Services were conducted by the Pioneers of Alaska Igloo No. 4 and the Masonic Lodge.

Sheldon was a past president of Pioneers of Alaska Igloo No. 4, past royal patron of the Order of the Amaranth and of the Order of the Eastern Star, and a member of the Masonic Order.
