= Bill Beltz =

Inuk politician

William Earnest Beltz (April 27, 1912 – November 21, 1960) was an American politician and carpenter.

Born in Bear Creek on the Seward Peninsula, Haycock, Alaska, Beltz was an Iñupiaq, the Inuit of Alaska. Beltz worked as a carpenter, elected President of the Alaska Council of Carpenters, and lived in Unalakleet, Alaska. A Democrat, Beltz served as a member of the House in the Alaska Territorial Legislature in 1949. He then served in the Territorial Senate from 1951 until 1959, when Alaska became a state. Beltz served in the Alaska State Senate from 1959 until his death in 1960. Beltz died at Alaska Native Medical Center in Anchorage, Alaska from a cancerous brain tumor.

He was born to John Skyles Beltz who went to Alaska during the Yukon Gold Rush in 1897 and Susie Goodwin Beltz. In 1953, Beltz married Arne Louise Bulkeley who was a U.S. Public Health Service village nurse in Unalakleet when they met; they had seven children.

In 1958 the first senate of the state of Alaska, unanimously elected Beltz president of the first senate of the state. Nome-Beltz Junior/Senior High School was named in his honor because of his efforts to provide education for rural residents. A conference room in the Thomas B. Stewart Legislative Office Building was named for Beltz.
