= William K. Boardman =

American politician (1915–1993)

Speaker of the Alaska House of Representatives
- In office 1967–1969
- Preceded by: Mike Gravel
- Succeeded by: Jalmar M. Kerttula

Member of the Alaska House of Representatives from the 1st district 2nd district 1961–1963
- In office January 23, 1961 – January 10, 1971 Serving with Walter L. Kubley (1961–1965), Lucille Pinkerton (1965–1967), Pete Cessnun (1967–1969), Frank Peratrovich (1969–1971)
- Preceded by: (at large)
- Succeeded by: Richard Whittaker

Personal details
- Born: William Knight Boardman; February 3, 1915 Nevada, Iowa, U.S.
- Died: March 18, 1993 (aged 78) Palm Springs, California, U.S.
- Spouse(s): Florence Pratt, Genie Chance (1971-1993)
- Children: 1
- Education: Drake University
- Occupation: Insurance underwriter, politician

William Knight Boardman (February 3, 1915 – March 18, 1993) was a Republican Alaska legislator who served as Speaker of the Alaska House of Representatives from 1967 to 1968.

Born in Iowa, Boardman was a resident of Ketchikan, Alaska. An insurance businessman, he served as a member of the Territorial House of Representatives from the 1st District from 1953 to 1954, and as an Alaskan alternate delegate to the 1956 Republican National Convention.

In 1960, Boardman was elected to the Alaska House of Representatives and served in that office through the remainder of the decade. He was the senior member of the House at the time of his reelection defeat in 1970. From 1967 to 1968, he was the 4th Speaker of the Alaska House of Representatives. His predecessor, Democrat Mike Gravel, was a U.S. Senator from 1969 to 1981.

Boardman was a Methodist. Married three times, he had one daughter. He died in Palm Springs, California on March 18, 1993, and was buried in Evergreen Cemetery in Juneau, Alaska.

Political offices
Preceded by Mike Gravel	Speaker of the Alaska House of Representatives; 1967 — 1968	Succeeded by Jalmar M. Kerttula
