= John E. Curtis =

American politician

Member of the Alaska House of Representatives from the 22nd district
- In office January 26, 1959 – January 23, 1961
- Succeeded by: Jacob Stalker

Personal details
- Born: February 11, 1915 Kotzebue, Alaska Territory
- Died: October 21, 1999 (aged 84) Anchorage, Alaska, U.S.
- Party: Republican
- Children: three
- Occupation: hunter, laborer

John Eklooruk Curtis (February 11, 1915 – October 21, 1999) was an American politician from the state of Alaska. He served in the Alaska House of Representatives from 1959 to 1961 as a Republican. He was Iñupiaq.
