= John Nusunginya =

American politician

Johnny Nusunginya

Member of the Alaska House of Representatives from the 21st district
- In office January 26, 1959 – January 1963

Personal details
- Born: March 13, 1927 Point Barrow, Alaska Territory
- Died: August 18, 1981 (aged 54) Anchorage, Alaska, U.S.
- Party: Democratic
- Spouse: Vera Bolt (died 1961)
- Children: eight
- Occupation: carpenter, businessman

Johnny Ned Nusunginya (March 13, 1927 – August 18, 1981) (Last name pronounced like Nusaŋiña in Iñupiaq) was an American politician from the state of Alaska. He served in the Alaska House of Representatives from 1959 to 1963 as a Democrat.

An Iñupiaq, he was born in Utqiagvik, Alaska, in 1927 and worked as a carpenter. He also owned a delivery service business in Utqiagvik, where he also served as mayor as well as director of civil defense. At the time of his election to the House in 1958, he was married and had six children. In his election platform, he stated that "non-discrimination" was an integral part of his reasoning to stand as a candidate, and that as a lifetime resident of Northern Alaska, he was "in the position to understand the problems of the natives in Alaska", stressing the need for progress for those groups.

On February 3, 1961, four people, including Nusunginya's wife, Vera (née Bolt), along with his six-year-old son and brother-in-law, were killed in a fire at the family home in Utqiagvik. Another infant, a child of Nusinginya's, was rescued by a bystander who rushed in take the child from the burning home; he was the sole survivor of the house fire, which had occurred in temperatures that measured −40 °F (−40 °C). Apparently caused due to an explosion of an oil stove, the fire transpired while his other six children were at school; thus they were unharmed. In May 1961, Nusunginya was arrested and charged by the United States Fish and Wildlife Service for hunting eider ducks out of season, which prompted protest from about 138 other Iñupiat, who presented 600 pounds of ducks to game wardens in the area in an act of civil disobedience, an unprecedented stand in solidarity by the Iñupiat people up until that time. The charges were later dropped.

Nusunginya died on August 18, 1981, in Anchorage, from heart failure.
