= Dora M. Sweeney =

American secretary and politician

Dora M. Sweeney (née Lundstrom) (June 19, 1907 – September 30, 2001) was an American secretary and politician.

Born in Biwabik, Minnesota, Sweeney moved with her family to Juneau, Alaska. Sweeney graduated from Juneau High School and went to the Hall School of Commerce in Seattle, Washington. She worked as a secretary. From 1955 to 1959, Sweeney served in the Alaska Territorial Legislature. Sweeney also served in the Alaska Constitutional Convention of 1955. From 1959 to 1965, Sweeney served in the Alaska House of Representatives and was a Democrat. Sweeney died in Juneau, Alaska.
