= Warren A. Taylor =

American lawyer and politician

First Speaker of the Alaska House of Representatives

Member of the Alaska House of Representatives
- In office 1959–1963
- Preceded by: Richard J. Greuel
- Succeeded by: Bruce Biers Kendall

Member of the Alaska House of Representatives
- In office 1959–1967

Warren Arthur Taylor (April 2, 1891 – August 5, 1980) was an American Democratic politician from Alaska active during its territorial period and first years of statehood. He became the first Speaker of the Alaska House of Representatives.

== Personal life ==
Taylor, a Baptist, was reported born in either Chehalis, Washington or in the nearby community of Curtis on April 2, 1891. He grew up in Bellingham, Washington, where he attended grade and high school. In 1909, following high school graduation, he moved to what was then known as the District of Alaska, settling in Cordova. After many years of working for the Copper River and Northwestern Railway, he passed the bar and began working as a lawyer.

Taylor moved to Kodiak briefly during the 1940s before settling in Fairbanks, where he lived for the remainder of his life.

== Career ==
As a lawyer, he focused on criminal defense law. In one case in 1948, he represented a young civilian employee at Ladd Field named Joseph Vogler, who sought an injunction against University Bus Lines and its owners Paul and Flora Greimann. Vogler had a public, years-long feud with the Greimanns, centered on their company's practice of having their vehicles straddle the center line of the narrow Cushman Street Bridge. That bridge, constructed in 1917, was later replaced with a four-lane bridge.

In other cases, he faced then-U.S. Attorney Ted Stevens, who later became another important Alaska politician. Stevens served as a Republican senator from Alaska from 1968 to 2009, making him the fourth most senior Senator and most senior Republican.

In addition to his professional career, Taylor served multiple terms in Alaska Territorial House of Representatives (from 3rd District 1933–1934, 1945–1946 and from 4th District 1949–1950, 1955–1958). He served from each of the communities he lived in during his years in Alaska (Cordova, then Kodiak, then Fairbanks). He was a delegate to the State Constitutional Convention (1955–1956), serving as one of a handful of delegates elected from the territory at-large.

After Alaska became the 49th State, Taylor was among the first members of the Alaska House of Representatives. He was selected by Democratic majority to serve as the first speaker of the Alaska House. He held this position from 1959 to 1962.

Taylor ran unsuccessfully for the Democratic nomination for governor of Alaska in 1962, losing to incumbent and fellow constitutional convention delegate William A. Egan. This meant that he was not a candidate for reelection to his House seat. Nonetheless, he was reelected to the House in 1962, when one of the Fairbanks-area Democratic nominees elected in the primary election vacated his spot in favor of Taylor. He retired from the House in 1966.

== Death ==
He later moved into the Fairbanks Pioneer Home, where he died on August 5, 1980.

Political offices
| Preceded by Richard J. Greuel (as speaker of the Territorial House) | Speaker of the Alaska House of Representatives; 1959–1963 | Succeeded by Bruce Biers Kendall |
