= Bruce B. Kendall =

American hotelier and politician

Bruce Biers (or Byers) Kendall (February 28, 1919 – July 6, 2012) was an American hotelier and Republican and Democratic politician from the territory and state of Alaska.

A Methodist, Kendall was born in Martinsburg, Nebraska and grew up in Sioux City, Iowa. He later moved to Alaska, living in Cordova, Valdez and Anchorage. He became one of the first members of the Alaska House of Representatives in 1959 after statehood.

In 1963, he became the first Republican Speaker of the Alaska House of Representatives. After Democrats regained control of the House, he was replaced as a speaker by Mike Gravel, future U.S. Senator.

Kendall remained a member of the State House until 1966. He later switched to the Democratic Party, and was the party's nominee for an open seat on the Alaska Senate in 1978, losing to Arliss Sturgulewski.

Political offices
Preceded by Warren A. Taylor	Speaker of the Alaska House of Representatives; 1963 – 1964	Succeeded by Mike Gravel
