= Frank Peratrovich =

American politician

Member of the Alaska House of Representatives
- In office 1969–1973

Member of the Alaska Senate
- In office 1959–1967

Personal details
- Born: April 2, 1895 Klawock, Territory of Alaska
- Died: January 4, 1984 (aged 88) Ketchikan, Alaska, U.S.
- Education: Haskell Indian Junior College

Frank Peratrovich (April 2, 1895 – January 4, 1984) was an American businessman and politician.

== Early life and education ==
Born in Klawock, Alaska to parents of mixed Tlingit and Serbian descent, Peratrovich served in the United States Navy during World War II. He attended the Haskell Indian Junior College in Lawrence, Kansas and the Capitol Business College in Portland, Oregon.

== Career ==
Peratrovich worked as an accountant in Oregon for several years. He returned to Klawock, Alaska and opened the Klawock Cash Store. Peratrovich served as mayor of Klawock as a Democrat.

In 1945–46, Peratrovich served in the Alaska Territorial House of Representatives. He then served in the Alaska Territorial Senate from 1947 to 1951 and from 1957 to 1959. Peratrovich served in the first Alaska Constitutional Convention of 1955. From 1959 to 1967, he served in the Alaska Senate. Peratrovich served in the Alaska House of Representatives from 1969 to 1973.

He received an honorary doctorate degree of Public Service from the University of Alaska Anchorage in 1973.

== Personal life ==
Peratrovich's brother, Roy Peratrovich, married Elizabeth Peratrovich, a Native leader who led the petition for the Anti-discrimination Act of 1945 in Alaska. He died at the Ketchikan Pioneer Home in Ketchikan, Alaska at the age of 88.
