= List of third-party and independent performances in Alaska state legislative elections =

Hundreds of third-party, independent, and write-in candidates have run for state office in the state of Alaska. Only candidates who achieved more than 5% of the vote are included.

== Ranked choice elections ==
=== State house ===
Election	District	Party	Candidate	Round	Votes	%	Place	Ref
2024	HD1	Non-affiliated	Agnes C. Moran	1st preference	1,503	24.53 / 100	2nd of 3	
2024	HD1	Non-affiliated	Grant Echohawk	1st preference	1,448	23.68 / 100	3rd of 3	
2024	HD2	Non-affiliated	Rebecca Himschoot	1st preference	4,544	97.59 / 100	Elected; Unopposed	
2024	HD5	Libertarian	Leighton Radner	1st preference	1,104	22.69 / 100	2nd of 2	
2024	HD6	Non-affiliated	Brent Johnson	1st preference	3,868	42.85 / 100	2nd of 3	
2024	HD6	Non-affiliated	Brent Johnson	Round 1	4,963	43.54 / 100	2nd of 3	
2024	HD6	Non-affiliated	Brent Johnson	Round 2	5,148	47.75 / 100	2nd of 2	
2024	HD9	Non-affiliated	Ky Holland	1st preference	4,723	53.08 / 100	Elected; 1st of 2	
2024	HD11	Non-affiliated	Walter T. Featherly	1st preference	3,321	45.89 / 100	2nd of 2	
2024	HD12	Non-affiliated	Calvin Schrage	1st preference	3,697	59.42 / 100	Elected; 1st of 2	
2024	HD14	Non-affiliated	Alyse S. Galvin	1st preference	3,810	77.77 / 100	Elected; 1st of 2	
2024	HD16	Non-affiliated	Nick Moe	1st preference	3,030	43.63 / 100	2nd of 2	
2024	HD19	Undeclared	Russell O. Wyatt	1st preference	270	8.10 / 100	3rd of 3	
2024	HD20	Libertarian	Scott A. Kohlhaas	1st preference	1,734	36.34 / 100	2nd of 2	
2024	HD36	Libertarian	James Fields	1st preference	408	5.54 / 100	4th of 4	
2024	HD36	Libertarian	James Fields	Round 1	490	5.54 / 100	4th of 4	
2024	HD37	Undeclared	Bryce Edgmon	1st preference	2,066	71.66 / 100	Elected; 1st of 2	
2024	HD37	Non-affiliated	Darren M. Deacon	1st preference	790	27.40 / 100	2nd of 2	
2024	HD38	Veterans	Willy Keppel	1st preference	780	26.31 / 100	3rd of 4	
2024	HD38	Veterans	Willy Keppel	Round 1	868	26.03 / 100	3rd of 4	
2024	HD38	Veterans	Willy Keppel	Round 2	895	27.30 / 100	3rd of 3	
2024	HD39	Alaskan Independence	Tyler L. Ivanoff	1st preference	1,376	41.3 / 100	2nd of 2	
2024	HD40	Undeclared	Thomas Ikaaq Baker	1st preference	731	24.1 / 100	3rd of 3	
2024	HD40	Undeclared	Thomas Ikaaq Baker	Round 1	743	24.4 / 100	3rd of 3 Eliminated	
2022	HD1	Non-affiliated	Dan Ortiz	1st preference	3,513	52.4 / 100	Elected; 1st of 2	
2022	HD2	Non-affiliated	Rebecca Himschoot	1st preference	4,151	58.3 / 100	Elected; 1st of 2	
2022	HD4	Undeclared	Darrell J. Harmon	1st preference	1,345	19.5 / 100	2nd of 2	
2022	HD11	Non-affiliated	Walter T. Featherly	1st preference	3,476	45.4 / 100	1st of 3	
2022	HD11	Non-affiliated	Walter T. Featherly	Round 1	3,484	45.4 / 100	1st of 3	
2022	HD11	Non-affiliated	Walter T. Featherly	Round 2	3,565	49.2 / 100	2nd of 2	
2022	HD12	Non-affiliated	Calvin Schrage	1st preference	3,820	59.9 / 100	Elected; 1st of 2	
2022	HD14	Non-affiliated	Alyse S. Galvin	1st preference	3,803	66.9 / 100	Elected; 1st of 2	
2022	HD26	Libertarian	Daniel L. Stokes	1st preference	1,226	18.5 / 100	2nd of 2	
2022	HD29	Non-affiliated	Elija D. Haase	1st preference	1,890	25.2 / 100	2nd of 2	
2022	HD37	Undeclared	Bryce Edgmon	1st preference	2,883	96.8 / 100	Elected; Unopposed	
2022	HD39	Alaskan Independence	Tyler L. Ivanoff	1st preference	1,766	48.4 / 100	2nd of 2	
2022	HD40	Non-affiliated	Josiah Patkotak	1st preference	2,358	97.7 / 100	Elected; Unopposed	

=== State senate ===
Election	District	Party	Candidate	Round	Votes	%	Place	Ref
2024	SDJ	Undeclared	Cheronda L. Smith	1st preference	2,413	30.02 / 100	2nd of 2	
2024	SDR	Undeclared	Savannah Fletcher	1st preference	6,116	40.73 / 100	2nd of 3	
2024	SDR	Alaskan Independence	Bert Williams	1st preference	954	6.35 / 100	3rd of 3	
2022	SDD	Non-affiliated	Andy Cizek	1st preference	1,768	11.6 / 100	3rd of 3	
2022	SDD	Non-affiliated	Andy Cizek	Round 1	1,787	11.7 / 100	3rd of 3 Eliminated	
2022	SDI	Undeclared	Heather Herndon	1st preference	2,428	32.1 / 100	2nd of 2	
2022	SDQ	Non-affiliated	John D. Bennett	1st preference	4,009	30.9 / 100	2nd of 3	
2022	SDQ	Alaskan Independence	Arthur P. Serkov	1st preference	774	5.9 / 100	3rd of 3	
2022	SDR	Alaskan Independence	Bert Williams	1st preference	2,275	15.5 / 100	3rd of 3	
2022	SDS	Veterans	Willy Keppel	1st preference	2,378	34.7 / 100	2nd of 2	

Results for ranked-choice elections past first preference will be available November 20.

== Before Measure 2 ==
=== State senate ===
These elections were held before the adoption of instant runoff voting in the state.

Election	District	Party	Candidate	Votes	%	Place	Ref
2020	SDB	Non-affiliated	Marna L. Sanford	6,612	36.9 / 100	2nd of 3	
2020	SDB	Non-affiliated	Evan A. Eads	987	5.5 / 100	3rd of 3	
2020	SDD	Non-affiliated	Dan Mayfield	2,622	14.3 / 100	2nd of 3 (Note: Placed ahead of Democratic nominee)	
2020	SDM	Non-affiliated	Andy Holleman	7,607	42.0 / 100	2nd of 2	
2020	SDP	Alaskan Independence	Greg Madden	6,404	33.0 / 100	2nd of 2	
2018	SDQ	Non-affiliated	Don R. Etheridge	6,803	37.8 / 100	2nd of 2	
2016	SDF	Non-affiliated	Tim Hale	4,750	27.7 / 100	2nd of 2	
2016	SDL	Non-affiliated	Tom Johnson	1,088	7.3 / 100	3rd of 3	
2016	SDN	Non-affiliated	Vince Beltrami	8,772	47.5 / 100	2nd of 2	
2014	SDE	Non-affiliated	Warren Keogh	4,888	34.8 / 100	2nd of 2	
2014	SDO	Non-affiliated	Eric D. Treider	3,411	23.2 / 100	2nd of 2	
2012	SDN	Non-affiliated	Ron Devon	7,202	40.7 / 100	2nd of 2	
2010	SDP	Non-affiliated	Philip L. Dziubinski	2,072	11.2 / 100	3rd of 3	
2008	SDC	Non-affiliated	Rosema Schneeberger	3,686	30.4 / 100	2nd of 2	
2006	SDH	Non-affiliated	Jay Cross	4,351	30.7 / 100	2nd of 2	
2004	SDO	Alaskan Independence	Eddie Burke Jr.	1,152	8.4 / 100	3rd of 3	
2004	SDQ	Non-affiliated	Robert E. Merchant	3,409	22.2 / 100	2nd of 2	
2004	SDT	Non-affiliated	Tara Sweeney	3,312	34.8 / 100	2nd of 2	
2002	SDF	Alaskan Independence	Trac S. Copher	1,906	17.5 / 100	2nd of 2	
2002	SDQ	Republican Moderate	Thomas Wagoner	5,638	46.0 / 100	Elected; 1st of 4	
2000	SDI	Republican Moderate	David Guzy	1,573	9.9 / 100	3rd of 3	
2000	SDM	Republican Moderate	Dawn Mendias	1,526	10.2 / 100	3rd of 4	
2000	SDM	Green	Greg Garcia	919	6.2 / 100	4th of 4	
1998	SDJ	Alaskan Independence	Tom Lamb	1,878	18.8 / 100	2nd of 2	
1996	SDI	Independent	Pat A. Abney	5,450	41.5 / 100	2nd of 2	
1994	SDL	Libertarian	Damon L. Cruz	1,041	14.5 / 100	2nd of 2	
1994	SDN	Alaskan Independence	Robert A. Shumaker	861	6.6 / 100	3rd of 3	
1992	SDC	Independent	Edward Naughton	1,710	20.6 / 100	3rd of 3	
1992	SDD	Alaskan Independence	James Udelhoven	912	7.7 / 100	3rd of 4	
1992	SDE	Independent Democrat	Judith Salo	6,014	49.1 / 100	Elected; 1st of 3	
1992	SDH	Green	Timothy Feller	593	6.9 / 100	3rd of 3	
1992	SDI	Alaskan Independence	Margaret Fischer	3,023	23.5 / 100	2nd of 3	
1992	SDI	Independent Democrat	James Garrigues	2,410	18.7 / 100	3rd of 3	
1992	SDM	Independent	Barbara Lacher	4,878	41.8 / 100	2nd of 2	
1992	SDN	Alaskan Independence	Robert A. Shumaker	1,429	11.6 / 100	3rd of 4	
1992	SDO	Green	David Stannard	930	7.4 / 100	3rd of 4	
1992	SDO	Alaskan Independence	John Eubank	643	5.1 / 100	4th of 4	
1992	SDP	Alaskan Independence	Frenchy Derushe	658	6.6 / 100	3rd of 3	
1992	SDQ	Alaskan Independence	Paul Chizmar	1,116	8.5 / 100	3rd of 3	
1992	SDR	Alaskan Independence	Vern Hurlbert	3,098	30.1 / 100	2nd of 3	
1992	SDR	Independent Republican	Paul Miller	2,095	20.3 / 100	3rd of 3	
1992	SDT	Alaskan Independence	William Kristovich	3,467	45.5 / 100	2nd of 2	
1990	SDH-B	Green	John J. G. Grames	782	5.8 / 100	3rd of 3	
1990	SDM	Independent Republican	Rick Reakoff	1,038	16.0 / 100	2nd of 2	
1986	SDF-B	Republican Moderate	Ray Metcalfe	6,399	34.2 / 100	2nd of 3	
1986	SDF-B	Libertarian	Jacob Levine	1,172	6.2 / 100	3rd of 3	
1982	SDC	Libertarian	John Manly	2,310	15.7 / 100	2nd of 2	
1982	SDD-B	Libertarian	Susan Shaffer	6,346	35.2 / 100	2nd of 2	
1982	SDJ	Libertarian	Geraldine Benshoof	9,335	23.7 / 100	3rd of 3	
1976	SDO	Independent	Jules Wright	1,088	6.0 / 100	4th of 4	
1974	SDA	Independent	Richard Whittaker	1,621	36.3 / 100	2nd of 2	
1974	SDO (2 seats)	Independent American	Dee Roberts	1,179	8.9 / 100	5th of 5	
1964	SDJ	Independent	Bill Seaton	1,544	10.1 / 100	3rd of 3	
1958	SDI (2-year)	Independent	Jack McCord	161	10.1 / 100	3rd of 4	
1958	SDJ (4-year)	Independent	Sherman Noyes	1,874	22.6 / 100	2nd of 3	
1958	SDJ (4-year)	Independent	Alice Stuart	439	5.3 / 100	3rd of 3	
1958	SDK (4-year)	Independent	Truman Emberg	574	45.2 / 100	2nd of 2	
1958	SDM (4-year)	Independent	Bob Longwith	349	8.2 / 100	2nd of 2	

=== State house ===
Election	District	Party	Candidate	Votes	%	Place	Ref
2020	HD6	Non-affiliated	Elijah M. Verhagen	644	7.3 / 100	3rd of 5	
2020	HD7	Non-affiliated	Jamin L. Burton	2,252	25.7 / 100	2nd of 2	
2020	HD14	Non-affiliated	Mike W. Risinger	2,960	27.9 / 100	2nd of 2	
2020	HD16	Libertarian	Scott A. Kohlhass	474	6.2 / 100	3rd of 3	
2020	HD22	Non-affiliated	Stephen T. Trimble	2,690	29.7 / 100	2nd of 3	
2020	HD22	Alaskan Independence Party	David W. Nees	1,362	15.0 / 100	3rd of 3	
2020	HD29	Non-affiliated	Paul D. Dale	3,482	34.6 / 100	2nd of 2	
2020	HD30	Non-affiliated	James Baisden	3,328	36.1 / 100	2nd of 2	
2020	HD31	Non-affiliated	Kelly Cooper	5,443	45.5 / 100	2nd of 2	
2020	HD34	Non-affiliated	Ed M. King	3,806	37.5 / 100	2nd of 2	
2020	HD36	Non-affiliated	Dan Ortiz	5,409	60.2 / 100	Elected; 1st of 2	
2020	HD38	Veterans	Willy Keppel	1,919	37.5 / 100	2nd of 2	
2020	HD40	Non-affiliated	Josiah Patkotak	2,292	52.1 / 100	Elected; 1st of 2	
2018	HD8	Libertarian	Mark Fish	767	10.8 / 100	3rd of 3 (Note: Placed ahead of Democratic nominee)	
2018	HD9	Non-affiliated	James A. Squyres	515	6.6 / 100	3rd of 3	
2018	HD10	Non-affiliated	Doyle E. Holmes	1,616	20.4 / 100	3rd of 3	
2018	HD19	Libertarian	Cean Stevens	1,211	31.9 / 100	2nd of 2	
2018	HD20	Libertarian	Warren P. West	296	5.1 / 100	3rd of 3	
2018	HD22	Non-affiliated	Jason Grenn	3,031	41.0 / 100	2nd of 3 (Note: Placed ahead of Democratic nominee)	
2018	HD32	Non-affiliated	Sandra M. Katelnikoff-Lester	767	12.4 / 100	3rd of 3	
2018	HD33	Non-affiliated	Chris Dimond	3,855	42.9 / 100	2nd of 2	
2018	HD36	Non-affiliated	Dan Ortiz	4,256	59.7 / 100	Elected; 1st of 2	
2018	HD40	Non-affiliated	Patrick G. Savok	878	21.8 / 100	2nd of 3	
2018	HD40	Non-affiliated	Leanna R. Mack	711	17.6 / 100	3rd of 3	
2016	HD3	Non-affiliated	Jeanne L. Olson	2,270	31.9 / 100	2nd of 3 (Note: Placed ahead of Democratic nominee)	
2016	HD9	Constitution	Pamela Goode	2,816	36.1 / 100	2nd of 2	
2016	HD11	Non-affiliated	Bert Verrall	2,681	31.6 / 100	2nd of 2	
2016	HD12	Constitution	Karen Perry	949	10.9 / 100	3rd of 3	
2016	HD14	Non-affiliated	Joe Hackenmueller	3,882	40.1 / 100	2nd of 2	
2016	HD16	Non-affiliated	Ian Sharrock	410	6.2 / 100	3rd of 3	
2016	HD22	Non-affiliated	Jason Grenn	3,561	46.3 / 100	Elected; 1st of 3	
2016	HD22	Alaskan Independence Party	Dustin T. Darden	730	9.5 / 100	3rd of 3	
2016	HD30	Non-affiliated	Daniel L. Lynch	473	5.7 / 100	3rd of 4 Tied	
2016	HD30	Constitution	J. R. Myers	473	5.7 / 100	3rd of 4 Tied	
2016	HD32	Non-affiliated	Duncan Fields	2,777	40.2 / 100	2nd of 3 (Note: Placed ahead of Democratic nominee)	
2016	HD36	Non-affiliated	Dan Ortiz	4,109	52.4 / 100	Elected; 1st of 3	
2016	HD36	Constitution	Kenneth Shaw	396	5.0 / 100	3rd of 3	
2014	HD7	Non-affiliated	Verne Rupright	2,209	35.2 / 100	2nd of 2	
2014	HD9	Constitution	Pamela Goode	1,874	26.7 / 100	2nd of 3 (Note: Placed ahead of Democratic nominee)	
2014	HD10	Non-affiliated	Roger Purcell	1,000	14.2 / 100	3rd of 3	
2014	HD18	Non-affiliated	Phil Isley	1,769	31.4 / 100	2nd of 2	
2014	HD19	Libertarian	Cean Stevens	1,461	36.1 / 100	2nd of 2	
2014	HD36	Non-affiliated	Dan Ortiz	3,530	50.5 / 100	Elected; 1st of 2	
2012	HD16	Non-affiliated	Phil Isley	343	5.6 / 100	3rd of 3	
2012	HD33	Non-affiliated	Kyle B. Johansen	641	9.0 / 100	3rd of 3	
2012	HD38	Non-affiliated	Dorothy J. Shockley	847	13.4 / 100	3rd of 3	
2010	HD20	Libertarian	Scott A. Kohlhass	918	30.4 / 100	2nd of 2	
2010	HD26	Non-affiliated	Phil Isley	1,696	27.5 / 100	2nd of 2	
2010	HD34	Alaskan Independence	Ray G. Southwell	1,334	18.6 / 100	2nd of 2	
2008	HD20	Libertarian	Scott A. Kohlhass	812	19.2 / 100	2nd of 2	
2008	HD33	Non-partisan	Kelly J. Wolf	1,013	12.4 / 100	3rd of 3	
2006	HD15	Independent	Myrl Thompson	2,990	41.9 / 100	2nd of 2	
2006	HD33	Alaskan Independence	John G. "Oz" Osborne	437	7.2 / 100	3rd of 3	
2006	HD36	Independent	Dan Ogg	1,811	39.8 / 100	2nd of 2	
2004	HD7	Truly Independent	Ward M. Merdes	1,889	19.7 / 100	3rd of 4	
2004	HD15	Non-partisan	Doyle E. Holmes	1,300	16.0 / 100	3rd of 3	
2004	HD15	Independent	Myrl Thompson	2,813	34.7 / 100	2nd of 3	
2004	HD17	Alaskan Independence	Nicholas J. Begich	2,965	35.9 / 100	2nd of 2	
2004	HD32	Independent	Jeffrey Todd Brown	586	5.6 / 100	3rd of 3	
2004	HD34	Non-partisan	Glen F. Martin	2,114	27.5 / 100	2nd of 2	
2004	HD35	Non-partisan	Mike Heimbuch	1,444	17.0 / 100	3rd of 4	
2004	HD39	Independent	Ralph Ivanoff	1,661	35.6 / 100	2nd of 2	
2002	HD13	Independent	Jim Colver	2,139	33.3 / 100	2nd of 4	
2002	HD14	Non-partisan	Peter H. Burchell	1,916	33.0 / 100	2nd of 3	
2002	HD15	Alaskan Independence	Jon B. Pinard	556	9.5 / 100	3rd of 3	
2002	HD16	Alaskan Independence	Lawrence Wood	1,564	24.7 / 100	2nd of 2	
2002	HD21	Republican Moderate	Clyde Baxley	408	6.8 / 100	3rd of 3	
2002	HD24	Non-partisan	Andree McLeod	468	9.9 / 100	3rd of 3	
2002	HD29	Republican Moderate	Ray Metcalfe	1,600	38.4 / 100	2nd of 2	
2002	HD34	Republican Moderate	James R. Price	1,700	28.2 / 100	2nd of 2	
2000	HD9	Republican Moderate	James R. Price	493	7.8 / 100	3rd of 3	
2000	HD10	Republican Moderate	Chuck May II	1707	22.5 / 100	2nd of 2	
2000	HD17	Republican Moderate	Ray Metcalfe	2247	34.5 / 100	2nd of 2	
2000	HD18	Independent	Patricia A. Abney	4399	47.9 / 100	2nd of 2	
2000	HD20	Green	Fryderyk Frontier	325	5.3 / 100	3rd of 4	
2000	HD20	Alaskan Independence	Thomas Lamb	323	5.3 / 100	4th of 4	
2000	HD24	Republican Moderate	Kenneth A. Terry	1769	25.5 / 100	2nd of 2	
2000	HD27	Alaskan Independence	Lawrence D. Wood	1170	12.1 / 100	3rd of 3	
2000	HD28	Alaskan Independence	Art A. Kohanes	1931	19.6 / 100	2nd of 2	
1998	HD26	Independent	Lucy Hope	2256	35.6 / 100	2nd of 2	
1998	HD27	Alaskan Independence	Lawrence Wood	409	5.3 / 100	3rd of 3	
1998	HD28	Alaskan Independence	A. W. Philo	1622	21.5 / 100	2nd of 2	
1998	HD39	Alaskan Independence	Dario Notti	1210	26.6 / 100	2nd of 2	
1996	HD8	Alaskan Independence	Louie R. March Jr.	318	5.4 / 100	3rd of 3	
1996	HD16	Alaskan Independence	John B. Griffin	255	8.4 / 100	3rd of 4	
1996	HD24	Independent	William R. Lester	2183	37.9 / 100	2nd of 2	
1996	HD28	Alaskan Independence	Donald E. Loesche	749	6.8 / 100	3rd of 3	
1996	HD33	Alaskan Independence	Paul Chizmar	486	7.4 / 100	3rd of 3	
1996	HD39	Independent	Willie Kasayulie	2049	45.1 / 100	2nd of 2	
1994	HD1	Independent	Cheri Davis	1,350	24.3 / 100	3rd of 3	
1994	HD2	Independent	Andy Anderson	2,235	37.0 / 100	2nd of 2	
1994	HD7	Alaskan Independence	Dale Wunderlich	402	7.0 / 100	3rd of 4	
1994	HD8	Green	Louie March Jr.	366	7.0 / 100	3rd of 3	
1994	HD9	Constitution	Gary Superman	465	10.3 / 100	3rd of 3	
1994	HD19	Independent Republican	Thomas Pitzke	299	6.0 / 100	3rd of 4	
1994	HD19	Alaskan Independence	Frederick Polsky	265	5.3 / 100	4th of 4	
1994	HD22	Independent	Clyde Baxley	502	8.8 / 100	3rd of 3	
1994	HD25	Independent	Ed Willis	2,722	51.3 / 100	Elected; 1st of 2	
1994	HD27	Republican Moderate	Gary Pearson	486	7.6 / 100	3rd of 3	
1994	HD28	Alaskan Independence	Lloyd A. Rudd	1,079	16.9 / 100	3rd of 4	
1994	HD28	Green	Paul Bratton	724	11.3 / 100	4th of 4	
1994	HD33	Independent	Karen Parr	1,922	32.6 / 100	2nd of 3	
1994	HD33	Alaskan Independence	Douglas Welton	525	8.9 / 100	3rd of 3	
1992	HD5	Alaskan Independence	Jerry Clifton	1,153	22.4 / 100	2nd of 2	
1992	HD7	Green	Benn Levine	482	8.0 / 100	3rd of 3	
1992	HD8	Alaskan Independence	Norm Stuard	524	9.3 / 100	3rd of 3	
1992	HD9	Independent	Gary Superman	672	12.0 / 100	3rd of 3	
1992	HD10	Alaskan Independence	Manuel Wallace	899	13.5 / 100	3rd of 3	
1992	HD12	Independent	Gene Eidem	1500	26.1 / 100	2nd of 2	
1992	HD17	Independent Republican	Dave Choquette	1535	28.3 / 100	3rd of 3	
1992	HD18	Alaskan Independence	H. A. Hoffman	862	11.3 / 100	3rd of 3	
1992	HD25	Independent	Ed Willis	2829	47.6 / 100	Elected; 2nd of 3	
1992	HD25	Alaskan Independence	Mike Dafermo	307	5.1 / 100	3rd of 3	
1992	HD26	Alaskan Independence	Mike Carson	552	9.5 / 100	3rd of 3	
1992	HD27	Alaskan Independence	Annette Spears	344	5.4 / 100	3rd of 3	
1992	HD27	Green	Benn Levine	328	5.2 / 100	4th of 4	
1992	HD28	Alaskan Independence	Doyle Holmes	1,077	17.7 / 100	3rd of 3	
1992	HD29	Alaskan Independence	Don Wright	501	7.3 / 100	3rd of 3	
1992	HD30	Alaskan Independence	Ruth Bohms	591	10.8 / 100	3rd of 3	
1992	HD32	Alaskan Independence	Arthur Griswold	389	8.9 / 100	3rd of 3	
1992	HD33	Alaskan Independence	Doug Welton	543	8.2 / 100	3rd of 3	
1992	HD35	Green	Charles Weaverling	1,300	22.6 / 100	3rd of 3	
1992	HD35	Alaskan Independence	Dean Sawyer	622	10.8 / 100	4th of 4	
1992	HD40	Alaskan Independence	Carl E. Moses	1,829	53.1 / 100	Elected; 1st of 2	
1990	HD1-B	Independent	Don Chenhall	2,830	38.8 / 100	2nd of 2	
1990	HD14-A	Independent	Ken Terry	1,071	11.9 / 100	3rd of 3	
1990	HD17	Independent	Billy J. Williams	835	19.0 / 100	3rd of 3	
1990	HD19	Independent Republican	Robert Pierce	732	19.0 / 100	3rd of 3	
1988	HD6	Alaskan Independence	Louis R. March	947	25.9 / 100	2nd of 2	
1988	HD11-A	Libertarian	Stephen W. Pidgeon	908	17.5 / 100	2nd of 2	
1988	HD17	Alaskan Independence	Robert Packard	550	12.3 / 100	3rd of 3	
1988	HD18	Alaskan Independence	Frenchy Derushe	582	8.0 / 100	3rd of 3	
1988	HD24	Alaskan Independence	Ernest Holmberg	1,393	44.9 / 100	2nd of 2	
1986	HD5-B	Libertarian	Andre Marrou	3,838	35.8 / 100	2nd of 3 (Note: Placed ahead of Republican nominee)	
1984	HD5-A	Libertarian	John C. Davis	2,442	21.7 / 100	3rd of 3	
1984	HD5-B	Libertarian	Andre Marrou	4,529	40.5 / 100	Elected; 1st of 3	
1984	HD18	Libertarian	Buzz Busbee	747	13.0 / 100	3rd of 3	
1982	HD1-A	Independent	Larry Baker	564	6.6 / 100	3rd of 3	
1982	HD3	Independent	Wes Craske	991	21.0 / 100	2nd of 2	
1982	HD5-A	Libertarian	Ted Carson	1,696	17.1 / 100	3rd of 3	
1982	HD5-B	Libertarian	Andre Marrou	9,766	27.8 / 100	2nd of 3 (Note: Placed ahead of Democratic nominee)	
1982	HD10-B	Independent	Ed Earnhart	859	10.2 / 100	3rd of 3	
1982	HD14-B	Independent	Rudy Johnson	1,953	21.4 / 100	3rd of 3	
1982	HD16-B	Independent	Elden Sandvik	2,177	20.1 / 100	3rd of 4	
1982	HD16-B	Libertarian	Darrel R. Welsh	1,000	9.2 / 100	4th of 4	
1982	HD17	Libertarian	Laurene Stout	928	20.1 / 100	3rd of 4	
1982	HD17	Independent	George L. Probert	491	10.6 / 100	4th of 4	
1982	HD18	Libertarian	Ronald Bergh	1,696	27.5 / 100	3rd of 3	
1982	HD19	Libertarian	Paul Allen Wagner	532	10.2 / 100	3rd of 4	
1982	HD19	Libertarian	Lynette Clark	430	8.2 / 100	4th of 4	
1982	HD21	Libertarian	Ken Fanning	2,193	38.5 / 100	2nd of 2	
1982	HD27	Libertarian	Ken Damm	1,188	31.4 / 100	2nd of 2	
1980	HD4 (2 seats)	Libertarian	Howard Mallory	1,788	15.2 / 100	4th of 4	
1980	HD8 (4 seats)	Libertarian	Chuck Hutchins	2,654	20.7 / 100	7th of 10	
1980	HD8 (4 seats)	Libertarian	Nora Collett	2,205	17.2 / 100	9th of 10	
1980	HD9 (2 seats)	Libertarian	John L. Phillips	805	17.3 / 100	4th of 6	
1980	HD9 (2 seats)	Libertarian	R. E. Hardy	314	6.8 / 100	6th of 6	
1980	HD12 (2 seats)	Libertarian	Joe Valiente	2907	27.8 / 100	4th of 5	
1980	HD20 (6 seats)	Libertarian	Dick Randolph	11,163	47.7 / 100	Elected; 1st of 18	
1980	HD20 (6 seats)	Libertarian	Ken Fanning	9,819	42.0 / 100	Elected; 4th of 18	
1980	HD20 (6 seats)	Libertarian	William I. Waugaman	5,323	22.8 / 100	14th of 18	
1980	HD20 (6 seats)	Libertarian	Ed A. Hoch	4,530	19.4 / 100	16th of 18	
1980	HD20 (6 seats)	Libertarian	Peter H. (Last name missing)	3,039	13.0 / 100	17th of 18	
1980	HD20 (6 seats)	Libertarian	Gary C. Cotten	2,832	12.1 / 100	18th of 18	
1978	HD19	Independent	Richard A. Johnson	938	28.9 / 100	3rd of 3	
1978	HD20 (6 seats)	Libertarian	Dick Randolph	6,784	36.5 / 100	Elected; 6th of 17	
1978	HD20 (6 seats)	Libertarian	Bruce Boyd	6,226	33.5 / 100	8th of 17	
1978	HD20 (6 seats)	Libertarian	Bruce W. Wammack	5,511	29.7 / 100	10th of 17	
1978	HD20 (6 seats)	Libertarian	F. A. Stein	5,282	28.4 / 100	11th of 17	
1978	HD20 (6 seats)	Independent	Dallas S. Benedict	1,100	5.9 / 100	16th of 17	
1976	HD8 (4 seats)	Independent	Ed Ditlevson	1,345	13.9 / 100	9th of 9	
1976	HD11 (2 seats)	Independent	Jim Garrigues	2,118	18.9 / 100	5th of 5	
1974 (First names unavailable)	HD7 (4 seats)	Independent	Miles	2,091	32.9 / 100	6th of 9	
1974 (First names unavailable)	HD14	Independent	Craig	500	31.5 / 100	2nd of 3	
1974 (First names unavailable)	HD16	Write-in	McGill	805	47.8 / 100	2nd of 3	
1974 (First names unavailable)	HD20 (6 seats)	Independent American	Voight	2,584	19.5 / 100	13th of 13	
1972 (Some first names unavailable)	HD13	Write-in	Wakefield	153	38.9 / 100	2nd of 1	
1972 (Some first names unavailable)	HD19	Write-in (Democratic)	Frank R. Ferguson	1,163	51.5 / 100	Elected; 1st of 2	
1972 (Some first names unavailable)	HD20	Write-in	Nakak	388	17.1 / 100	3rd of 2	
1970 (First names unavailable)	HD4 (3 seats)	Independent American	Craig	761	12.7 / 100	5th of 7	
1970 (First names unavailable)	HD8 (14 seats)	Independent	Sanuita	1,789	5.6 / 100	27th of 29	
1970 (First names unavailable)	HD8 (14 seats)	Independent American	Czerski	1,692	5.3 / 100	29th of 19	
1970 (First names unavailable)	HD13	Write-in	Emberg	409	36.3 / 100	2nd of 1	
1970 (First names unavailable)	HD13	Write-in	Shawback	305	27.0 / 100	3rd of 1	
1970 (First names unavailable)	HD14	Write-in	Guy	842	47.7 / 100	2nd of 1	
1964 (First names unavailable)	HD10	Independent	Seaton	393	15.1 / 100	3rd of 3	
1960 (Some first names unavailable)	HD7	Write-in	Davis	159	27.5 / 100	2nd of 1	
1960 (Some first names unavailable)	HD14	Write-in	Franz	182	31.8 / 100	2nd of 1	
1960 (Some first names unavailable)	HD20	Write-in (Republican)	Kenneth A. Garrison	356	69.5 / 100	Elected; 1st of 3	
1960 (Some first names unavailable)	HD24	Write-in (Democratic)	Segundo Llorente	210	53.3 / 100	Elected; 1st of 3	
1960 (Some first names unavailable)	HD24	Write-in	A. Johnson	93	23.6 / 100	2nd of 3	
1958 (Some first names unavailable)	HD6	Independent	Heinmiller	448	40.0 / 100	2nd of 3	
1958 (Some first names unavailable)	HD7	Independent	Harold Z. Hansen	267	40.4 / 100	Elected; 1st of 3	
1958 (Some first names unavailable)	HD8	Independent	Ewan	82	11.2 / 100	3rd of 3	
1958 (Some first names unavailable)	HD9	Independent	Snider	370	23.9 / 100	2nd of 3	
1958 (Some first names unavailable)	HD15	Independent	Jay S. Hammond	350	49.5 / 100	Elected; 1st of 3	
1958 (Some first names unavailable)	HD15	Independent	Noden	190	26.9 / 100	2nd of 3	
