= Fran Ulmer =

American politician

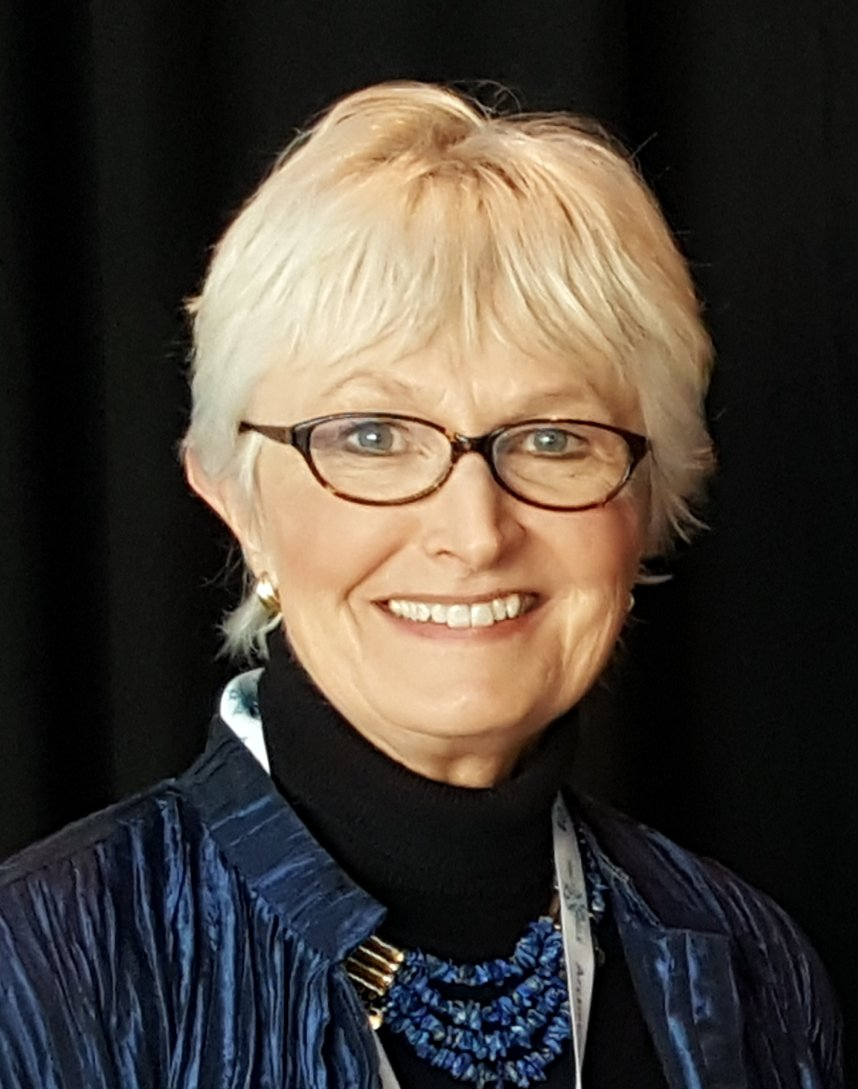
- Ulmer in 2019

Chair of the United States Arctic Research Commission
- In office March 10, 2011 – July 28, 2020
- President: Barack Obama; Donald Trump
- Preceded by: Mead Treadwell
- Succeeded by: Jon Harrison

7th Lieutenant Governor of Alaska
- In office December 5, 1994 – December 2, 2002
- Governor: Tony Knowles
- Preceded by: Jack Coghill
- Succeeded by: Loren Leman

Member of the Alaska House of Representatives from the 4-B & 3 district
- In office January 19, 1987 – December 5, 1994
- Preceded by: Jim Duncan
- Succeeded by: Kim Elton

Mayor of Juneau
- In office 1983–1985
- Preceded by: Bill Overstreet
- Succeeded by: Ernest Polley

Personal details
- Born: February 1, 1947 (age 79) Madison, Wisconsin, U.S.
- Party: Democratic
- Spouse: Bill Council (m. 1977; died 2013)
- Children: 2
- Education: University of Wisconsin, Madison (BA, JD)

Frances Ann "Fran" Ulmer (born February 1, 1947) is an American administrator and Democratic politician from the U.S. state of Alaska. She served as the seventh lieutenant governor of Alaska from 1994 to 2002 under Governor Tony Knowles, becoming the first woman elected to statewide office in Alaska, and lost the 2002 gubernatorial election against Republican Frank Murkowski. In 2007 she became the Chancellor of the University of Alaska Anchorage (UAA), before serving as Chair of the United States Arctic Research Commission between 2011 and 2020, appointed by President Barack Obama.

== Early life ==
Frances Ann "Fran" Ulmer was born in Madison, Wisconsin, and grew up in Horicon, Wisconsin. Her parents owned a furniture store and a funeral home in the area. Her education included a bachelor's degree with a double major in economics and political science from the University of Wisconsin–Madison and a Juris Doctor cum laude from the University of Wisconsin Law School. In 2018, Fran was awarded an Honorary Doctor of Humane Letters from the University of Alaska Anchorage. In 1977, she married attorney Bill Council. They had two children. They were married until his death in 2013.

== Alaska politics ==
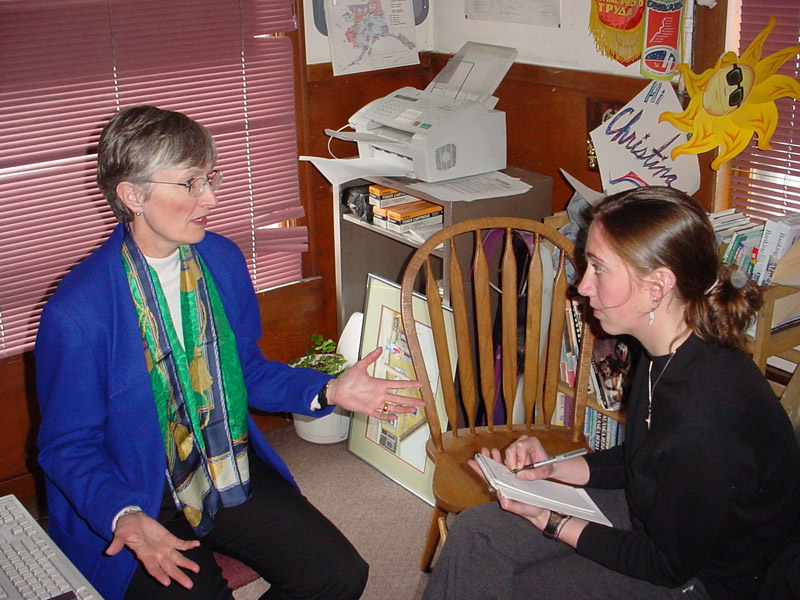
Ulmer during an interview in 2002

Ulmer first began working in Alaska in 1973 as a lawyer at the Legislative Affairs Agency in Juneau, Alaska. Ulmer worked as a legislative assistant for Jay Hammond, the Republican governor of Alaska from 1975 through 1977. He appointed her Director of Policy Development and Planning that year, a role she held until 1981. She served on Juneau's Planning and Zoning Commission from 1981 to 1983.

She served as mayor of Juneau from 1983 to 1985 and was in the Alaska House of Representatives from 1987 to 1994 as a Democrat, where she sponsored and won approval of legislation concerning criminal justice, education, public administration, health, and transportation. From 1993 to 1994 she served as the house minority leader.

In 1994 she won the open primary for the nomination for lieutenant governor. She was elected to two four-year terms on the Democratic ticket, along with Governor Tony Knowles. In that post, she became a nationally recognized leader in election reform and making government more efficient and accessible through telecommunications. During her tenure, Alaska became the first state to replace the punched card system with a statewide optical scanning ballot counting system.

=== Alaska gubernatorial election, 2002 ===
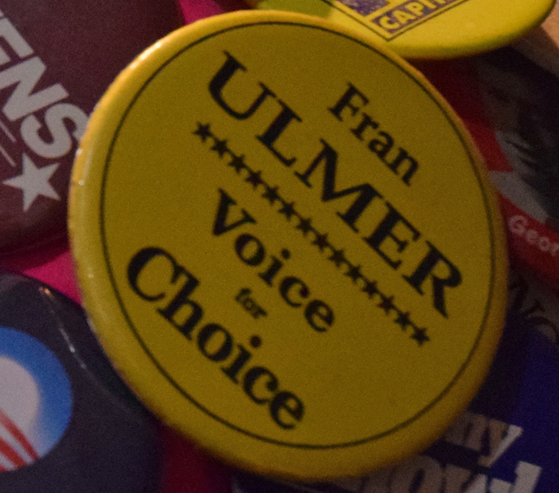
A Fran Ulmer for Governor campaign button from 2002.

In 2002, she won the nomination of the Democratic party for the office of governor. She lost the election to the Republican candidate, U.S. Senator Frank Murkowski.

== Post electoral career ==
In 2003, Fran was a fellow at the Harvard Institute of Politics in Cambridge, MA. In 2004, she accepted a teaching job at the University of Alaska, Anchorage. She served as the Director of the Institute of Economic and Social Research (ISER) at UAA. In March 2007, University of Alaska system President Mark R. Hamilton appointed Ulmer interim chancellor for the University of Alaska Anchorage. In April 2008, she accepted the position of chancellor on a permanent basis. As chancellor, she was responsible for governing UAA and its eight satellite facilities in Southcentral Alaska. On January 22, 2010, she announced her intent to resign from the Chancellor's position at UAA, effective 2011.

At the national level, Ulmer served as a member of the North Pacific Anadromous Fish Commission for ten years, on the Federal Communications Commission’s State and Local Advisory Committee, the Federal Election Commission's State Advisory Committee, and as co-chair of the Aspen Institute's Arctic Climate Change Commission.

In June 2010, President Barack Obama appointed Ulmer to the seven-member National Commission on the BP Deepwater Horizon Oil Spill and Offshore Drilling. The commission was charged with investigating the causes of the explosion and oil spill and recommending changes to prevent future disasters. She served on the boards of The Nature Conservancy, First National Bank Alaska, the CIRI Foundation, Commonwealth North, the National Parks Conservation Association, the Union of Concerned Scientists, and she chaired the global board of The Nature Conservancy (2019-2022). She currently serves on the National Parks Conservation Association Board and the Alaska Trustees of The Nature Conservancy.

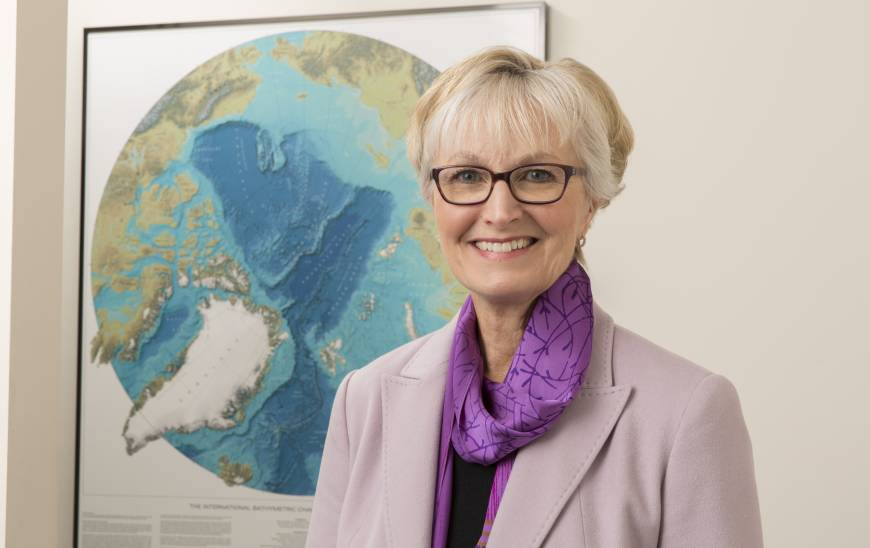
Official portrait as chair of the US Arctic Research Commission, 2011

In 2011, President Barack Obama appointed Ulmer as chair of the US Arctic Research Commission. In July 2014, Ulmer was appointed a special advisor to John Kerry, the U.S. Secretary of State, on arctic issues. She endorsed the building of more icebreakers to allow the United States Coast Guard to better research the arctic. On July 28, 2020, President Trump appointed Jon Harrison to serve as the Chair of the Arctic Research Commission. On November 10, 2020, Randy "Church" Kee, a retired major general of the United States Air Force, was appointed to the position previously assigned to Ulmer.

In 2018 she was a Visiting Professor at Stanford University in the Department of Earth System Science in the School of Earth, Energy, and Environmental Sciences and in 2019, she joined Harvard’s Belfer Center Arctic Initiative as a Senior Fellow, serving until 2023.

In 2021 she was appointed as one of the additional campaign co-chairs for former Independent governor Bill Walker's gubernatorial campaign.

== Electoral history ==
Alaska House of Representatives, District 4, Seat B, 1986
Party	Candidate	Votes	%
Democratic	Fran Ulmer	7,957	66.5
Republican	Leslie E. "Red" Swanson	3,928	32.8
Write-In		64	0.5

Alaska House of Representatives, District 4, Seat B, 1990
Party	Candidate	Votes	%
Democratic	Fran Ulmer	8,564	70.3
Republican	Cathy Crawford	3,555	29.9
Write-In		60	0.4
Democratic hold			

Alaska House of Representatives, District 3, 1992
Party	Candidate	Votes	%
Democratic	Fran Ulmer	5,210	69.8
Republican	Dale Anderson	2,233	29.9
Write-In		19	0.2

Alaska lieutenant governor primary, 1994
Party	Candidate	Votes	%
Independence	Jack Alleman	2,173	3.6
Democratic	Fran Ulmer	40,442	66.1
Green	Roger Lewis	3,570	5.8
Independence	Tom Staudenmaier	2,831	4.6
Democratic	Bill Sabo	5,771	9.4
Independence	Margaret Ward	6,356	10.4

2002 gubernatorial election, Alaska
Party	Candidate	Votes	%	±%
Republican	Frank Murkowski	129,279	55.85	+38.0
Democratic	Fran Ulmer	94,216	40.70	−10.6
Green	Diane E. Benson	2,926	1.26	−1.7
Independence	Don Wright	2,185	0.94	+0.9
Republican Moderate	Raymond VinZant	1,506	0.65	−5.5
Libertarian	Billy Toien	1,109	0.48	+0.5
Write-ins		263	0.11	−19.7
Majority		35,063	15.2	−17.8
Turnout		231,484	50.5	+1.9
Republican gain from Democratic		Swing	-48.2	

== See also ==
- List of female lieutenant governors in the United States

Political offices
Preceded by Bill Overstreet	Mayor of Juneau; 1983–1985	Succeeded by Ernest Polley
Preceded by Jack Coghill	Lieutenant Governor of Alaska; 1994–2002	Succeeded by Loren Leman
Party political offices
Preceded by Max Gruenberg	Democratic Leader of the Alaska House of Representatives; 1993–1994	Succeeded by Jerry Mackie
Preceded by Willie Hensley	Democratic nominee for Lieutenant Governor of Alaska; 1994, 1998	Succeeded by Ernie Hall
Preceded by Tony Knowles	Democratic nominee for Governor of Alaska; 2002	Succeeded by Tony Knowles
Alaska House of Representatives
Preceded by Ramona Barnes	Minority Leader of the Alaska House of Representatives; 1993–1994	Succeeded by Jerry Mackie
