= 1998 Alaska gubernatorial election =

- November 3, 1998
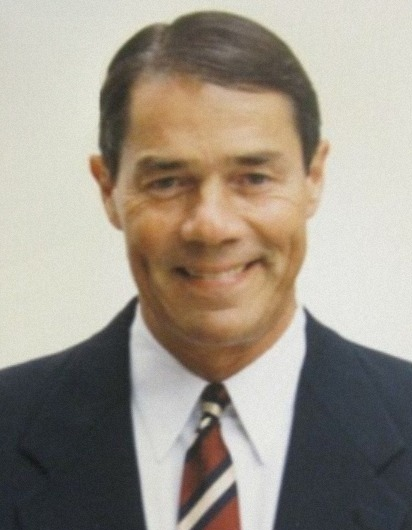

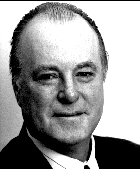

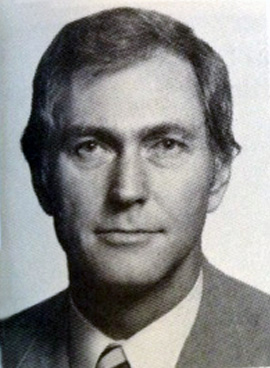

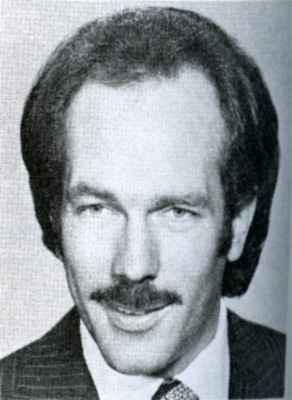
Nominee	Tony Knowles	Robin L. Taylor (write-in)
Party	Democratic	Republican
Running mate	Fran Ulmer	none
Popular vote	112,879	40,209
Percentage	51.27%	18.26%
Nominee	John H. Lindauer	Ray Metcalfe
Party	Republican	Republican Moderate
Running mate	Jerry Ward	Clyde Baxley
Popular vote	39,331	13,540
Percentage	17.86%	6.15%
- Results by state house district Knowles: 30–40% 40–50% 50–60% 60–70% 70–80% Write-In: (Note: Since the vast majority of the write-in votes were towards Republican Robin L. Taylor, he likely won the Ketchikan district. However, the original election report does not separate the write-in votes by candidate, so it cannot be known for sure.) 40–50%
Governor before election
Tony Knowles
Democratic
Elected Governor
Tony Knowles
Democratic

The 1998 Alaska gubernatorial general election took place on November 3, 1998. The election resulted in a landslide for the Democratic incumbent, Tony Knowles, who had won the 1994 gubernatorial election by only 536 votes. Jim Sykes, founder of the Green Party of Alaska, ran on that party's ticket, but Desa Jacobsson later replaced him on the ballot.

Knowles was the first incumbent governor to attain re-election since 1978 and the last until 2022. His victory also marked the last time until 2026 a Democrat was elected Governor of Alaska.

== Open primary ==
Incumbent Governor Tony Knowles easily won the Democratic nomination over two minor challengers. On the Republican side, three major candidates jockeyed for the nomination: businessman John Howard Lindauer, state senator Robin L. Taylor, and Wayne A. Ross. Lindauer won the open primary election, with Taylor coming in second. Ray Metcalfe, a defecting Republican who had founded the Republican Moderate Party of Alaska, also ran, along with Green Party candidate Jim Sykes and three candidates from the Alaskan Independence Party. Desa Jacobsson replaced Sykes as the Green Party candidate in the general election.

1998 open primary for Alaska governor
Party	Candidate	Votes	%
Democratic	Tony Knowles (inc.)	38,788	35.57
Republican	John Lindauer	25,070	22.99
Republican	Robin Taylor	17,679	16.21
Republican	Wayne Ross	17,445	16.00
Democratic	Nels Anderson, Jr.	3,387	3.11
Green	Jim Sykes	2,251	2.06
Democratic	Don Wright	1,494	1.37
Republican Moderate	Ray Metcalfe	1,157	1.06
Independence	Sylvia Sullivan	981	0.90
Independence	Harold Haldane	466	0.43
Independence	Robert Gigler	339	0.31
Total votes		109,057	100.00

Fran Ulmer and Jerry Ward won the Democratic and Republican nominations for lieutenant governor, respectively. Clyde Baxley won the Republican Moderate nomination. Despite the results of the primary, the Green Party nominee in the general election was Mike Milligan, while Alaskan Independence Party candidate Sylvia Sullivan did not have an official running mate.

1998 open primary for lieutenant governor
Party	Candidate	Votes	%
Democratic	Fran Ulmer (inc.)	44,998	42.35
Republican	Jerry Ward	28,261	26.60
Republican	Virginia Collins	13,089	12.32
Republican	Don Smith	8,230	7.75
Republican	Doyle Holmes	5,764	5.43
Independence	David Harrison	2,923	2.75
Green	Dan Winn	2,006	1.89
Republican Moderate	Clyde Baxley	973	0.92
Total votes		106,244	100.00

== Campaign ==
Lindauer's campaign faltered late in the race as a result of his failure to disclose that his wife, a wealthy Chicago lawyer, had financed the bulk of his campaign. As a result of this revelation, the Republicans withdrew their support of Lindauer and backed Robin Taylor, the runner-up in the Republican primary, as a write-in candidate. Due to the lateness of this change, the Republicans unsuccessfully attempted to obtain a court order to delay the election. The collapse of Lindauer's campaign resulted in a three-way split of the Republican vote between him, Taylor, and the Republican Moderate Metcalfe.

Knowles defeated Taylor, his closest opponent, by 33%, the widest margin of victory for a gubernatorial candidate in Alaska history. Moreover, if Taylor's and Lindauer's totals are added together, Knowles defeated the two Republicans combined by 16% – still the widest margin in Alaska history until 2010. This was also the first time since 1970 that any candidate won an outright majority of the vote in an Alaska gubernatorial election.

=== Results ===
1998 Alaska gubernatorial election
Party	Candidate	Votes	%	±%
Democratic	Tony Knowles (incumbent)	112,879	51.27	+10.2
Republican Write-in	Robin L. Taylor	40,209	18.26	+18.2
Republican	John Howard Lindauer	39,331	17.86	−22.9
Republican Moderate	Ray Metcalfe	13,540	6.15	N/A
Green	Desa Jacobsson	6,618	3.01	−1.1
Independence	Sylvia Sullivan	4,238	1.92	−11.8
Write-in	Others	3,362	1.53	+1.4
Majority		72,670	33.01	+32.7
Turnout		220,177	48.57	−14.9
Democratic hold		Swing	+32.7	
