= Jerry Ward =

American politician

Member of the Alaska Senate from the E district
- In office January 21, 1997 – January 21, 2001
- Preceded by: Judith Salo
- Succeeded by: Tom Wagoner

Member of the Alaska House of Representatives from the 13 district
- In office January 21, 1983 – January 21, 1985
- Preceded by: Patrick O'Connell
- Succeeded by: Pat Pourchot

Personal details
- Born: July 19, 1948 (age 78) Anchorage, Alaska, U.S.
- Party: Republican

Jerry Ward (born July 19, 1948) is an American politician and businessman.

== Early life ==
An Alaska Native born in Anchorage, Alaska, Ward served in the United States Navy during the Vietnam War and was in the Navy Seabees. Ward was in the real estate business.

== Political career ==
In 1982, Ward was elected to the Alaska House of Representatives as a Republican, serving from 1983 until 1985.

In 1990, he won the Alaska Independence Party primary for Lt. Governor. However, he and his running mate, gubernatorial candidate John Howard Lindauer, stepped aside in favor of former Governor Walter Hickel, and the defecting Republican lieutenant gubernatorial candidate, state Senator Jack Coghill, who won the general election over ex-Anchorage Mayor, Democrat Tony Knowles and state Senator Willie Hensley, with Republican state Senator Arliss Sturgulewski finishing third.

In 1996 and 2000 he won elections to the Alaska State Senate.

In 1998, running again for statewide office, he joined now-Republican Lindauer as his lieutenant governor candidate. Thanks in part to a campaign financing scandal, their ticket finished far behind incumbent Governor Knowles and third behind a write-in candidate, state senator Robin L. Taylor.

Ward was defeated for reelection in 2002 by prison opponent and City of Kenai mayor Tom Wagoner of the Republican Moderate Party.

He lost again in 2004 to Wagoner, by then a Republican.

During his terms in the state senate, Ward was substantially involved in numerous failed attempts to build Alaskan for-profit prisons. Those schemes eventually resulted in federal criminal prosecutions of numerous corporate executives and Republican legislators. Although he wasn't charged, Ward remained under investigation as of 2009. On December 15, 2008, the Anchorage Daily News reported that Ward was implicated in the probe. He had been accused of a conspiracy involving Bill Weimar to accept an illegal $20,000 campaign contribution. Weimar had a $5.5 million interest, contingent solely on the approval and building of a Cornell Companies prison in Alaska. On August 23, 2004, Weimar sent a $3,000 check toward the settlement of a $20,000 invoice from a political consultancy. Later that same day he sent by express mail $8,500 in cash drawn from a Polson, Montana bank. A day later he sent another $8,500 in cash drawn from the Polson bank, according to federal court documents. Daily cash transactions of over $10,000 mandate federal reporting per the Bank Secrecy Act. Ward allegedly convinced a witness in the trial against Senator Ted Stevens to lie about an immunity deal in court to ensure that Ward was included in it and would therefore not be prosecuted. According to federal prosecutors, Ward had been under investigation for some time over his relationship with Weimar, ultimately convicted of two felony counts in the matter, receiving a federal prison sentence. While he also was presumed to be under continued investigation, Ward was not charged.

In 2006, Ward ran once more for Lt. Governor in the Republican primary but was defeated by Sean Parnell.

Ward ran Donald Trump's 2016 presidential campaign in Alaska, was rewarded with a position in the Department of Education, but resigned not long afterward.

Party political offices
Preceded by Al Rowe	Alaskan Independence nominee for Lieutenant Governor of Alaska; 1990	Succeeded by Jack Coghill
Preceded by Mike W. Miller	Republican nominee for Lieutenant Governor of Alaska; 1998	Succeeded by Loren Leman
