= Robin Taylor =

Robin Taylor may refer to:

- Robin Lord Taylor, American actor and director
- Robin L. Taylor, lawyer and politician in Alaska

== See also ==
- Robin Tyler, American comedian
