= Jerry Mackie =

Jerry Mackie may refer to:

- Jerry Mackie (footballer)
- Jerry Mackie (politician)
