= 1978 Alaska gubernatorial election =

- November 7, 1978
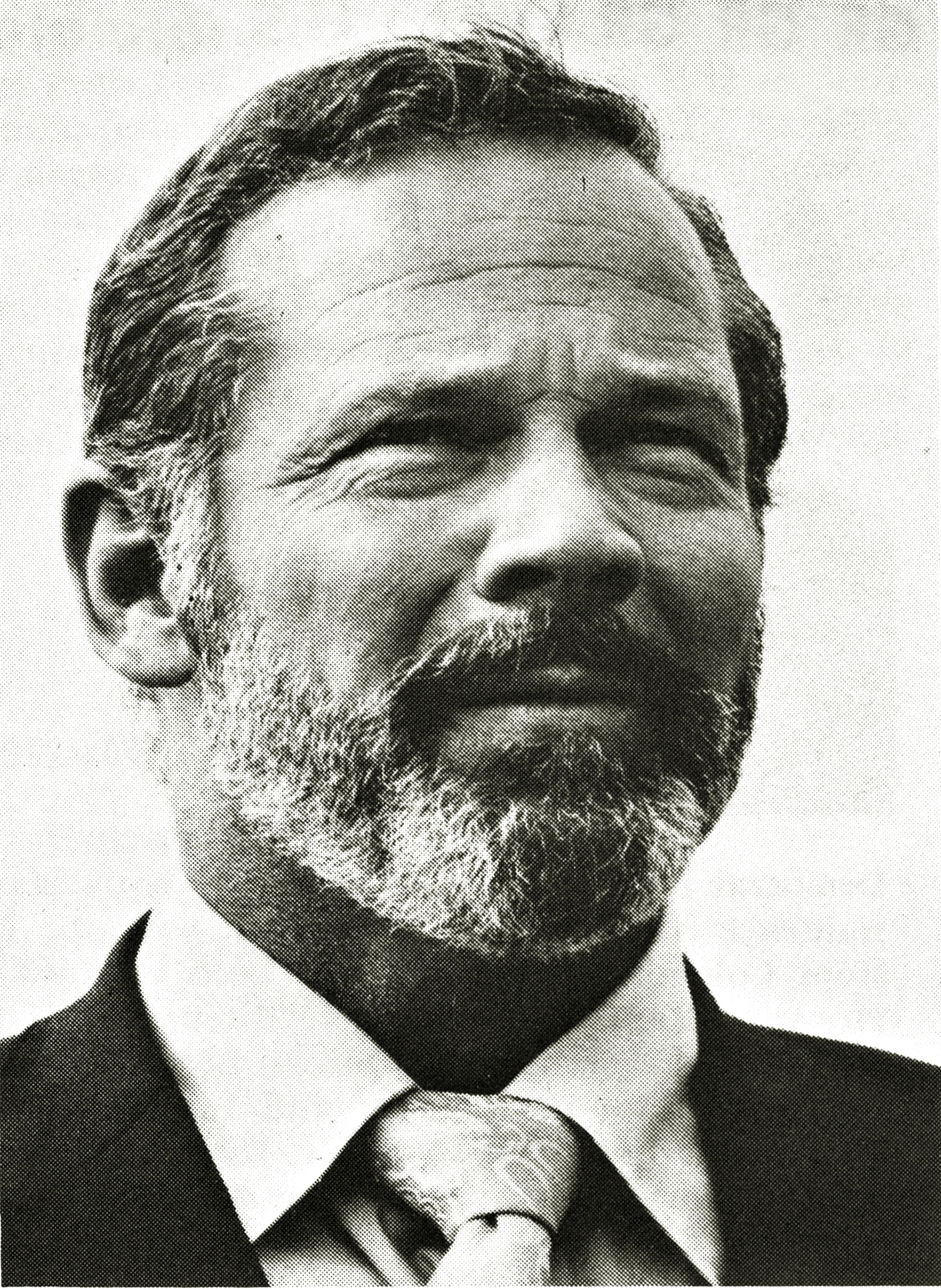

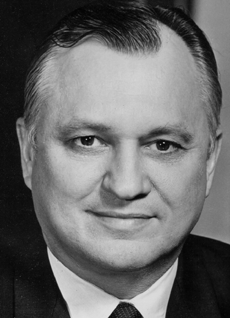

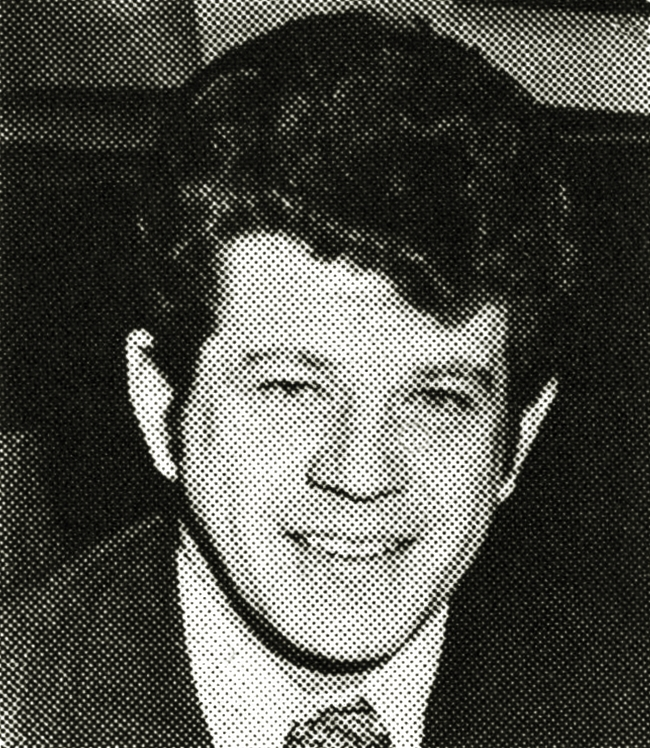

Nominee	Jay Hammond	Wally Hickel
Party	Republican	Write-In
Running mate	Terry Miller	None
Popular vote	49,580	33,555
Percentage	39.07%	26.44%
Nominee	Chancy Croft	Tom Kelly
Party	Democratic	Independent
Running mate	Katie Hurley	Kathryn Poland
Popular vote	25,656	15,656
Percentage	20.22%	12.34%
- Results by state house district Hammond: 30–40% 40–50% 50–60% Hickel: 30–40% Croft: 30–40%
Governor before election
Jay Hammond
Republican
Elected Governor
Jay Hammond
Republican

The 1978 Alaska gubernatorial election took place on November 7, 1978, to elect the governor of Alaska. Republican incumbent Jay Hammond defeated four opponents: former Governor of Alaska and write-in candidate Wally Hickel, Alaska Senator and Democratic nominee Chancy Croft, former Commissioner of Natural Resources and Independent candidate Tom Kelly and Alaskan Independence Party nominee Don Wright. After losing to Hammond in the Republican primary, Hickel ran as a write-in candidate and was able to outperform Croft. Republican Tom Fink and Democrat Jay Kerttula also ran in the open primary.

This was the first time an incumbent Republican governor was re-elected for a second term, and this would not occur again until 2022. This was also the last time until 1998 that an incumbent governor, regardless of party, would be re-elected, and the last time a Republican was elected governor of Alaska until 2002.

== Results ==
Open Primary Result
Party	Candidate	Votes	%	±%
Republican	Jay Hammond (inc.)	31,921	30.01%	
Republican	Wally Hickel	31,823	29.92%	
Republican	Tom Fink	17,487	16.44%	
Democratic	Chancy Croft	8,910	8.38%	
Democratic	Edward A. Merdes	8,655	8.14%	
Democratic	Jay Kerttula	7,125	6.70%	
Republican	Jimmie D. Lockhart	451	0.42%	
Turnout		106,372		

1978 Alaska gubernatorial election
Party	Candidate	Votes	%	±%
Republican	Jay Hammond (inc.)	49,580	39.07%	−8.60%
Write-In	Wally Hickel (write-in)	33,555	26.44%	
Democratic	Chancy Croft	25,656	20.22%	−27.15%
Independent	Tom Kelly	15,656	12.34%	
Independence	Don Wright	2,463	1.94%	−3.02%
Majority		16,025	12.63%	
Turnout		126,910		
Republican hold		Swing		
