= 1994 Alaska gubernatorial election =

- November 8, 1994
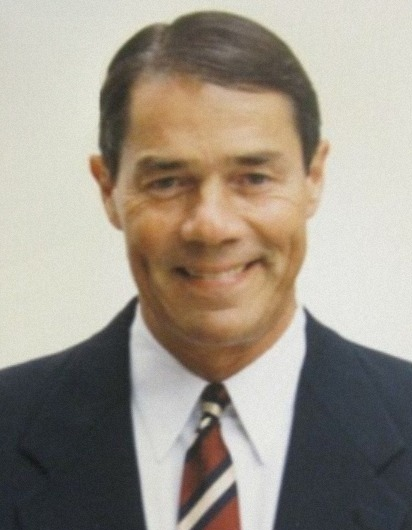

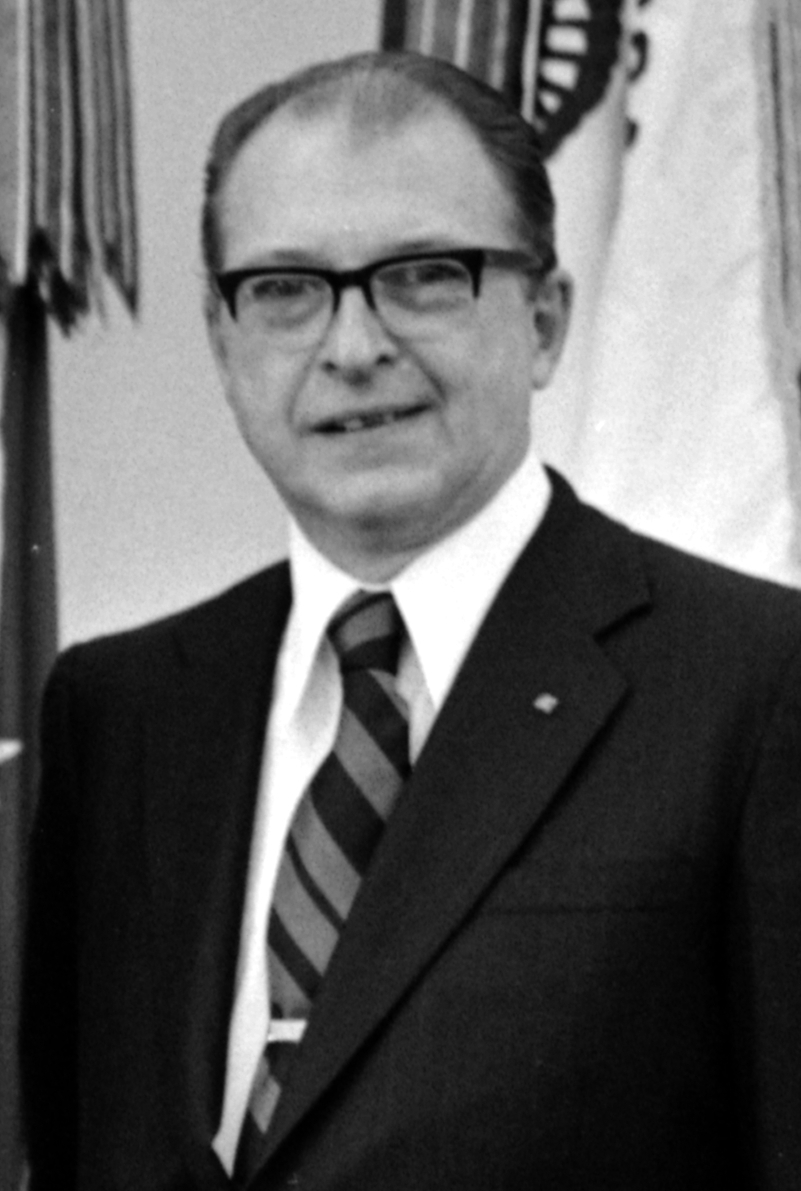
Nominee	Tony Knowles	Jim Campbell	Jack Coghill
Party	Democratic	Republican	Independence
Running mate	Fran Ulmer	Mike W. Miller	Margaret Ward
Popular vote	87,693	87,157	27,838
Percentage	41.08%	40.84%	13.04%
- Results by state house district Knowles: 30–40% 40–50% 50–60% 60–70% 70–80% Campbell: 30–40% 40–50% 50–60%
Governor before election
Wally Hickel
Republican
Elected Governor
Tony Knowles
Democratic

The 1994 Alaska gubernatorial election took place on November 8, 1994, for the post of Governor of Alaska, United States. Incumbent Governor Wally Hickel did not seek re-election. Democratic candidate Tony Knowles narrowly defeated Republican candidate Jim Campbell and Lieutenant Governor Jack Coghill of the Alaskan Independence Party.

This was the only governorship to flip from Republican to Democratic in the 1994 Republican Revolution.

== Democratic primary ==
=== Candidates ===
==== Nominated ====
- Tony Knowles, former mayor of Anchorage (1982–1987)

==== Eliminated in primary ====
- Sam Cotten, former speaker of the Alaska House of Representatives (1989–1991)
- Steve McAlpine, former lieutenant governor of Alaska (1982–1990)

=== Results ===
Democratic primary results
Party	Candidate	Votes	%
Democratic	Tony Knowles	24,727	44.07%
Democratic	Steve McAlpine	17,482	31.16%
Democratic	Sam Cotten	13,899	24.77%
Total votes		56,108	

== Other candidates ==
Incumbent Governor Wally Hickel had been elected as the candidate of the Alaskan Independence Party in the 1990 gubernatorial election. In April 1994 he rejoined the Republican Party and announced in August that he would not stand for re-election.

For the Republican nomination, businessman Jim Campbell narrowly defeated another former mayor of Anchorage, Tom Fink. Lieutenant Governor Jack Coghill was easily selected as the candidate for the Alaskan Independence Party while Jim Sykes ran for the Green Party of Alaska.

Ralph Winterrowd, an Anchorage businessman, ran as the candidate of the Patriot Party.

== Campaign ==
Both main candidates in the election were regarded as moderates and favored oil exploration in the Arctic National Wildlife Refuge as well as cuts in the state budget. Polls near the election showed Knowles with a strong lead over Campbell.

During the election the Campbell campaign ran an advertisement comparing Knowles's hair with President Bill Clinton's. The advert was criticised by supporters of Knowles who felt it implied that he was a womanizer.

=== Polling ===
Source	Date	Knowles (D)	Campbell (R)
Dittman Research	Nov. 3, 1994	44%	33%

== Recount ==
As the results were counted state officials said that the contest between Knowles and Campbell was too close to call, with Knowles having a small lead. Knowles declared victory on November 18 after the official count showed that he was ahead by 528 votes with only 217 votes remaining to be counted. He described the victory as the "largest margin I think I've ever won by" as his Anchorage mayoral election wins had always been by very narrow margins.

Campbell contested the results and called for a recount, which was paid for by the state as the candidates were within half a percent of each other. Campbell also wanted to look into some voter incentives that had taken place including raffles and free gasoline for voters. These were defended as attempts to increase turnout and had been authorised by election officials.

The initial count showed Knowles with 87,701 votes and Campbell with 87,118 votes. The results of the recount slightly narrowed the gap between them with Knowles ending at 87,693 and Campbell at 87,157. Knowles's victory margin was the smallest in any Alaska gubernatorial election.

== Election results ==
1994 Alaska gubernatorial election
Party	Candidate	Votes	%	±%
Democratic	Tony Knowles	87,693	41.08	+10.2
Republican	Jim Campbell	87,157	40.84	+14.7
Independence	Jack Coghill	27,838	13.04	−25.8
Green	Jim Sykes	8,727	4.09	+0.7
Patriot	Ralph Winterrowd	1,743	0.82	+0.3
Write-ins		277	0.13	−0.0
Majority		536	0.24	−7.7
Turnout		213,435	63.5	−1.3
Democratic gain from Republican		Swing	−36.01	
