= Niilo Koponen =

American politician (1928–2013)

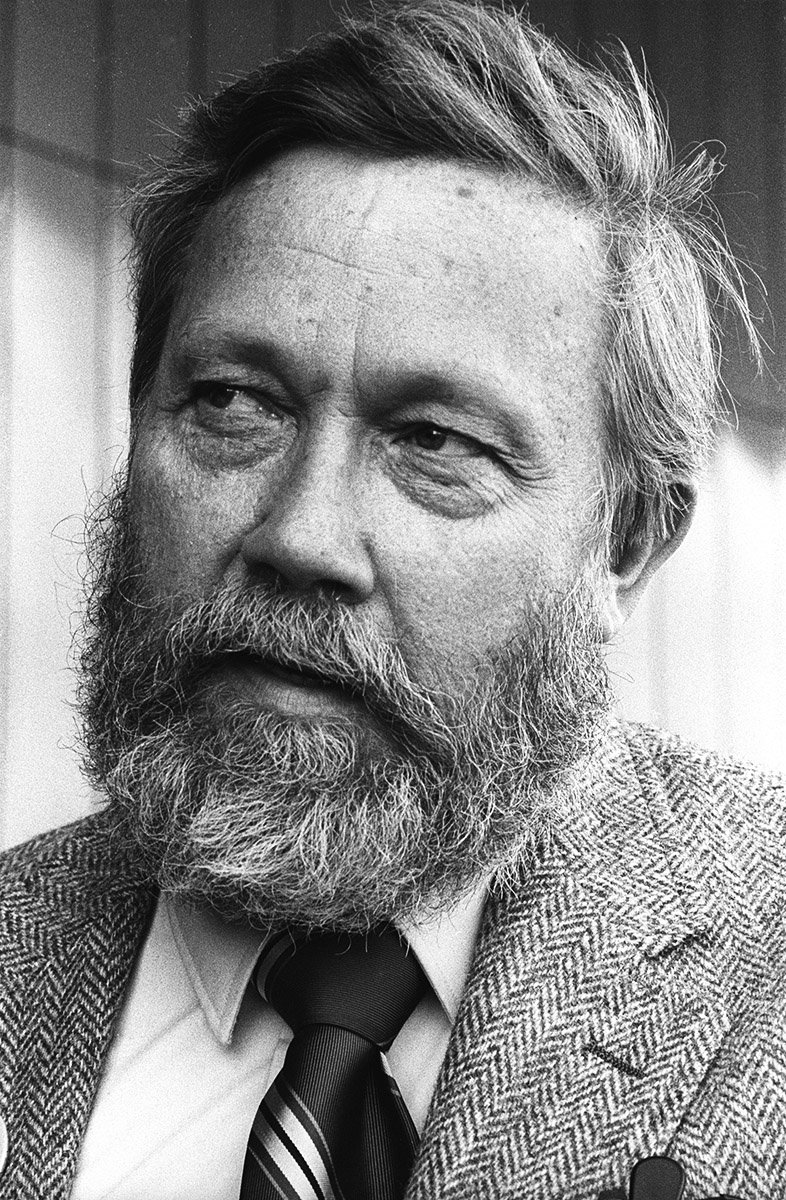

Member of the Alaska House of Representatives from the 21st district
- In office January 17, 1983 – January 11, 1993
- Preceded by: Redistricted
- Succeeded by: John N. Davies (redistricting)

Personal details
- Born: March 26, 1928 New York City, U.S.
- Died: December 3, 2013 (aged 85) Fairbanks, Alaska, U.S.
- Party: Democratic
- Spouse: Joan Forbes Koponen
- Children: Five
- Education: Wilberforce University (BS); University of Alaska (BEd); Harvard University (EdD)
- Profession: Educator; Electrician

Niilo Emil Koponen (March 6, 1928 – December 3, 2013) was an American educator and politician.

== Early life ==
Born in New York City to Finnish parents, he lived with them in a housing cooperative in a Jewish neighborhood in the Bronx. Koponen attended the High School of Music & Art in New York City.

== Education ==
He attended Cooper Union with a major in civil engineering from 1947 to 1948. He then attended Wilberforce University in Wilberforce, Ohio graduating with a B.S. 1952 in social administration and sociology. In 1957, Koponen received a B.Ed from the University of Alaska in education and anthropology, along with a teaching certificate. In 1958-59, he and his family moved for him to study anthropology at the London School of Economics, where he matriculated with honors. In 1964-66, the family again left Fairbanks, in order to study educational administration at Harvard University's Graduate School of Education and earned his doctorate there.

== Move to Alaska ==
At that point, he married a Boston-born student from the nearby Yellow Springs campus of Antioch College whom he met while folk dancing). They moved to Fairbanks, Alaska in 1952, homesteading 160 acres on Chena Ridge and raising five children.

He worked several jobs, including as an electrician on the F.E. Company's gold dredges. Koponen's resumé was very extensive.

He taught in elementary school and was principal of the University Park Elementary School of the Fairbanks North Star Borough School District. He resurrected the Fairbanks branch of Head Start, serving as Executive Director 1972-1976.

During his time in Alaska, Koponen was very involved in his community, serving on the City of Fairbanks Parks and Recreation Commission (1970–73), Chena Community Association, Fairbanks Administrative Committee on Social Services, Chairman Fairbanks Head Start Association (1967–71), Kiwanis, Tanana Valley State Fair Board of Directors (1959–63, 1967–70) and served on the Fairbanks American Civil Liberties Union's board from 1972-1976. He was co-founder of the Alaska Federation for Community Self Reliance which sponsored the Fairbanks Community Garden.

He helped organized the Greater Fairbanks Teachers Credit Union, serving on the board 1958-62 and 1966-72. This credit union later became the Northern Schools Credit Union, then the Spirit of Alaska Federal Credit Union). He also organized the Chena Goldstream Volunteer Fire Department. He and his wife donated the property on which the Department's Station 2 now occupies.

He was engaged as an active Quaker, co-founding the Chena Ridge Friends Meeting in Fairbanks.

== Alaska House of Representatives ==
Koponen served in the Alaska House of Representatives in 1982-1992 as a Democrat. In 1982, Koponen defeated Ken Fanning, one of the country's only Libertarian legislators taking approximately 61% of the vote. He was one of thirteen members of Democratic Socialists of America to be elected to a state legislature that year.

He served in the 13th, 14th, 15th, 16th, and 17th Legislatures. He represented the 21st district. During lean times when constituents would ask to cut the budget, his response was to ask "what program or service do you currently benefit from do you want to cut?"

== Death ==
Koponen died at the Pioneer's Home in Fairbanks on December 3, 2013, and a memorial was held January 5, 2014.
