= Santa Claus House =

Retail store in North Pole, Alaska

- Company type: Gift shop (current); Trading post (historic)
- Industry: Retail
- Founded: 1952; 74 years ago
- Founder: Con Miller, Nellie Miller
- Headquarters: North Pole, Alaska, United States
- Products: Letters from Santa Claus, ornaments, apparel, postcards
- Owner: Mike W. Miller
- Website: santaclaushouse.com

The Santa Claus House is a Christmas-themed retail store in North Pole, Alaska. It was founded as a trading post alongside the Richardson Highway in 1952 by Con and Nellie Miller, shortly after North Pole itself was founded by real estate developer Everett Dahl. The Santa Claus House served as North Pole's post office from its inception through the early 1970s. Around that same time, the business was relocated coincidental with the relocation of the Richardson Highway through North Pole. Ownership and management was passed down to sons Terry (prior to his untimely death) and Mike, who also hold the distinction of being the only brother pair who both served as president of a state senate in the United States. Santa Claus House is known for the world's largest Santa statue and its "Letters from Santa".
