= Bill Overstreet =

American teacher, administrator, and politician (1926–2013)

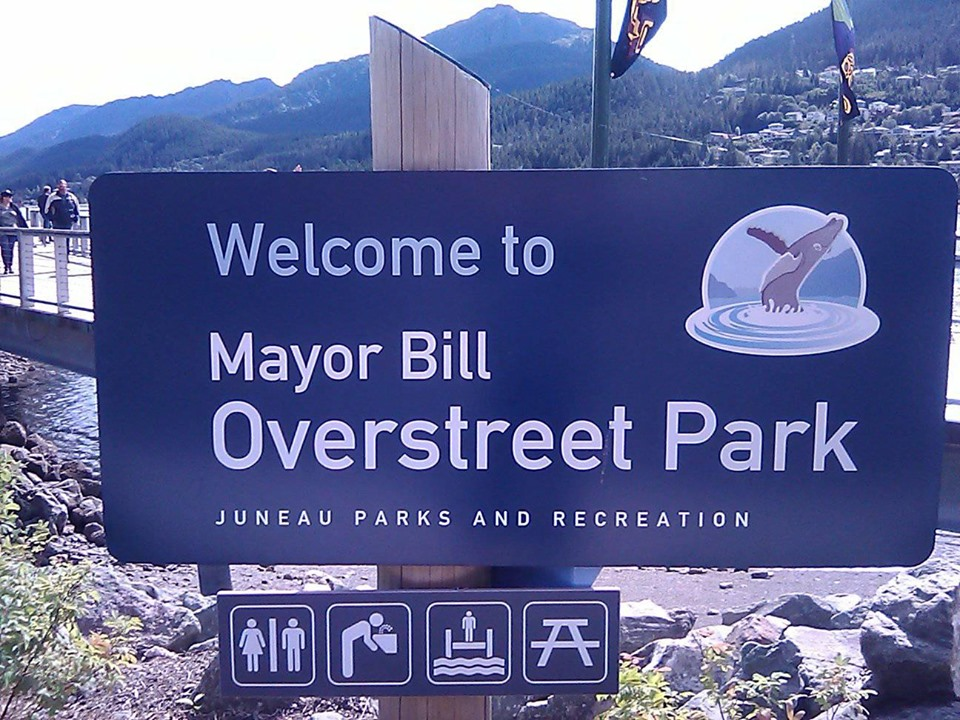
Mayor Bill Overstreet Park sign in Downtown Juneau

William D. Overstreet was an American teacher, administrator, and politician. He served as the mayor of Juneau, Alaska, from 1976 to 1983. He was born and raised in Waynoka, Oklahoma. He died in Sun City West, Arizona, on April 8, 2013, at the age of 86.

== Early life ==
Bill Overstreet was born on May 1, 1926, in Waynoka, Woods County, Oklahoma, to Henry Harrison and Mary Ellen Overstreet. In 1942, at the age of 17, he quit school, enlisted in the U.S. Navy and was ordered to serve on the USS Portland, where he was involved in the Aleutian Islands Campaign, going ashore at Adak, and the Battle of the Pips. He manned a 20-millimeter machine gun on the Portland's deck. Overstreet was discharged from the Navy in 1942, after which he returned to Waynoka, earned his GED, and enrolled at Northwestern Oklahoma State University in Alva, Oklahoma. While attending the university, he married Jean Perry on May 25, 1947. They had one son, William Overstreet, Jr. After Overstreet graduated in 1951, his family moved to Colorado, where he worked as a history teacher at Huerfano County High School in Walsenburg.

== Education career ==
While working as a history teacher in Colorado, Overstreet was urged by his sister and a cousin who lived in Juneau to come teach in Alaska. After researching the state, he wrote then-superintendent Sterling Sears, to relay his interest for a job. After moving to Juneau, he worked a few odd jobs, including construction work on Harborview School and a Stream Guard in Haines, Alaska, before he went to teach at Fifth Street School. For five years, Overstreet taught eighth grade and coached basketball at the school. While taking a sabbatical to advance his own education, Overstreet received his master's degree from the University of Washington. With this additional degree, he went on to be principal of Fifth Street School and, eventually, superintendent of the Juneau School District. Overstreet was also the first executive director for the Alaska School Board Association. After dedicating 20 years of his life to education, he retired.

== Political career ==
Overstreet was first elected to the Juneau Assembly in 1973, just after the vote by the Alaskan people to move the capital away from Juneau had been made. Hoping the knowledge and connections he obtained over many years of traveling around the state would help, he decided to run for mayor with a goal of helping Juneau remain the capital of Alaska. In 1976, he was elected mayor for the first of three terms.

As mayor, Overstreet mainly focused on keeping the capital in Juneau. He managed to do so by switching Alaska from four time zones to one and modernizing the city with the construction of a Centennial Hall and a ski course. He also participated in two major debates against Bill Atwood, a proud supporter for the moving of the capital, one of which was before the Anchorage Chamber of Commerce. After much debate and work on Overstreet's part the capital move project was shut down.

Near the end of his time as mayor, Overstreet planned to retire, but after participating in a Chamber of Commerce event, he was given the opportunity to represent Alaska in Tokyo as a Trade Representative. He and his wife, Jean, moved to Tokyo, where he worked for a few years.

During his last few years, Overstreet contributed his time and effort to support local projects, including the Whale Project, which is a bronze statue of a breaching humpback whale.
