= Mike W. Miller =

American businessman and politician

Mike Miller

President of the Alaska Senate
- In office 1997–1998

Member of the Alaska Senate
- In office 1993–2001

Member of the Alaska House of Representatives
- In office 1983–1993

Personal details
- Born: August 7, 1951 (age 75) Fairbanks, Territory of Alaska
- Party: Republican
- Relations: Terry Miller (brother)
- Education: University of Alaska Fairbanks

Military service
- Branch/service: Alaska Air National Guard

Mike W. Miller (born August 7, 1951) is an American businessman and politician.

== Early life and education ==
Born in Fairbanks, Alaska, Miller went to Monroe Catholic High School and the University of Alaska Fairbanks.

== Career ==
Miller served in the Alaska Air National Guard. He was the owner and manager of Santa Claus House in North Pole, Alaska. Miller served on the North Pole City Council from 1976 to 1980 as a Republican. From 1983 to 1993, Miller served in the Alaska House of Representatives. He then served in the Alaska Senate from 1993 to 2001 and was president of the senate in 1997 and 1998.

Miller ran for United States Senate in 2004, but lost the Republican primary to Lisa Murkowski.

Party political offices
Preceded by Jim Campbell	Republican nominee for Lieutenant Governor of Alaska; 1994	Succeeded by Jerry Ward
