= 2002 Alaska gubernatorial election =

- November 5, 2002
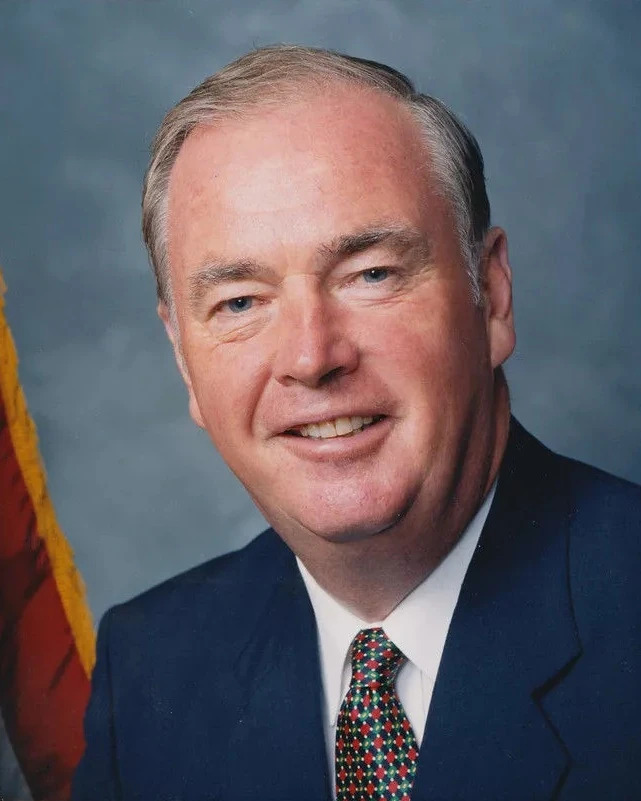

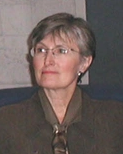
Nominee	Frank Murkowski	Fran Ulmer
Party	Republican	Democratic
Running mate	Loren Leman	Ernie Hall
Popular vote	129,279	94,216
Percentage	55.85%	40.70%
- Results by state house district Murkowski: 40–50% 50–60% 60–70% 70–80% Ulmer: 40–50% 50–60% 60–70% 70–80%
Governor before election
Tony Knowles
Democratic
Elected Governor
Frank Murkowski
Republican

The 2002 Alaska gubernatorial election took place on November 5, 2002, for the post of Governor of Alaska. Republican U.S. Senator Frank Murkowski defeated Democratic Lieutenant Governor Fran Ulmer. Murkowski became the first Republican elected governor of Alaska since Jay Hammond in 1978.

== Primaries ==
Incumbent Democratic Governor Tony Knowles was term limited from running again. Lieutenant Governor Fran Ulmer easily won the Democratic primary on August 27 against outsiders Michael Beasley and Bruce Lemke, neither of whom did much campaigning. Meanwhile, Senator Frank Murkowski also gained an easy win in the Republican primary.

== Campaign ==
Murkowski started the campaign as the clear favorite as Ulmer, despite being lieutenant governor, had a lot less name recognition. Polls initially showed Ulmer about 20 percent behind Murkowski but as the campaign continued Ulmer closed on Murkowski in the polls by concentrating on local issues such as the state budget and by portraying herself as a moderate. By October polls showed the candidates about level with one poll on October 17 showing Ulmer at 46% and Murkowski at 43%.

The biggest issue in the campaign was the economy and what to do about the projected budget shortfall in Alaska. The issue dominated the October debates between the two candidates in Fairbanks and Anchorage. Ulmer argued that the state should consider introducing a statewide tax for the first time since 1980 if the budget reserve fell too far and that state spending should be capped. However Murkowski opposed any new taxes and called his opponent pro-tax. He said that new oil prospects, high oil prices and revenues from other resources could close the gap in the budget.

President George W. Bush made an advertisement supporting Murkowski, who also received support from Republicans Gale Norton, Ted Stevens and Don Young. Ulmer received support from former Republican Governor Jay Hammond, Governor Tony Knowles and called on voters to support her so that Murkowski could stay working as Senator for Alaska in Congress. During the campaign Murkowski refused to say whom he would appoint to serve his remaining two years as U.S. senator but after the election appointed his daughter Lisa Murkowski, majority leader-elect in the Alaska House of Representatives, to fill the seat.

=== Debate ===
2002 Alaska gubernatorial election debate
No.	Date	Host	Moderator	Link	Republican	Democratic
Key: P Participant A Absent N Not invited I Invited W Withdrawn						
Key: P Participant A Absent N Not invited I Invited W Withdrawn					Frank Murkowski	Fran Ulmer
1	Oct. 22, 2002	C-SPAN; KUAC-TV	Robert Hannon	C-SPAN	P	P

=== Predictions ===
Source	Ranking	As of
The Cook Political Report	Tossup	October 31, 2002
Sabato's Crystal Ball	Lean R (flip)	November 4, 2002

=== Election results ===
U.S. Senator Frank Murkowski won the election with 55.9% of the vote, the highest percentage for any Alaska gubernatorial candidate up to that time.

2002 Alaska gubernatorial election
Party	Candidate	Votes	%	±%
Republican	Frank Murkowski	129,279	55.85	+38.0
Democratic	Fran Ulmer	94,216	40.70	−10.6
Green	Diane E. Benson	2,926	1.26	−1.7
Independence	Don Wright	2,185	0.94	+0.9
Republican Moderate	Raymond VinZant	1,506	0.65	−5.5
Libertarian	Billy Toien	1,109	0.48	+0.5
Write-ins		263	0.11	−19.7
Majority		35,063	15.2	−17.8
Turnout		231,484	50.5	+1.9
Republican gain from Democratic		Swing	−48.2	
