= Lloyd Jones (politician) =

American politician (born 1937)

Member of the Alaska Senate from the A district
- In office 1987–1992
- Preceded by: Bob Ziegler
- Succeeded by: Robin L. Taylor

Personal details
- Born: September 23, 1937 (age 89) Elma, Washington, U.S.
- Party: Republican
- Spouse: Jan Faiks
- Education: University of Washington

Lloyd Jones (born September 23, 1937) is an American politician who served as a member of the Alaska Senate from 1987 and 1992. He was succeeded in office by Robin L. Taylor.

== Early life and education ==
He was born in Elma, Washington and attended J. M. Weatherwax High School in Aberdeen, Washington. He earned a bachelor's degree from the University of Washington.

== Career ==
A Republican, Jones represented District A in the Alaska Senate between 1987 and 1992. Jones had previously served on the Petersburg, Alaska City Council. Jones also worked in the logging business.

== Personal life ==
Jones was married to Jan Faiks, who served in the Alaska Senate from 1982 to 1990.
