= Jan Faiks =

American politician

Janice O. "Jan" Faiks (November 17, 1945 – April 10, 2017) was an American politician who served in the Alaska Senate.

== Biography ==
Faiks was born at Mitchel Air Force Base in New York and attended Choctawhatchee High School. She studied math at Florida State University and earned a master's degree in counseling psychology from University of Alaska Anchorage. She taught in the Anchorage School District from 1968 to 1978 and served two terms in the Alaska Senate, from 1982 to 1990. In 1987 and 1988, she also served as the Alaska Senate's first female president. She was one of the key legislators who created the Constitutional Budget Reserve (CBR), a savings fund for surplus tax revenues to be utilized in leaner periods.

After losing the Republican primary in 1990, she moved to Washington D.C., with her husband, Lloyd Jones, also a former Alaska state Senator. She earned a degree from the Georgetown Law Center. Faiks lobbied for PhRMA, the Pharmaceutical Research and Manufacturers of America, retiring in 2013.

== Death ==
In 2016, she was diagnosed with brain cancer. She died in Amelia Island, Florida, where she and her husband had relocated, on April 10, 2017. She was 71 years old.
