= Huerfano County High School =

- U.S. National Register of Historic Places
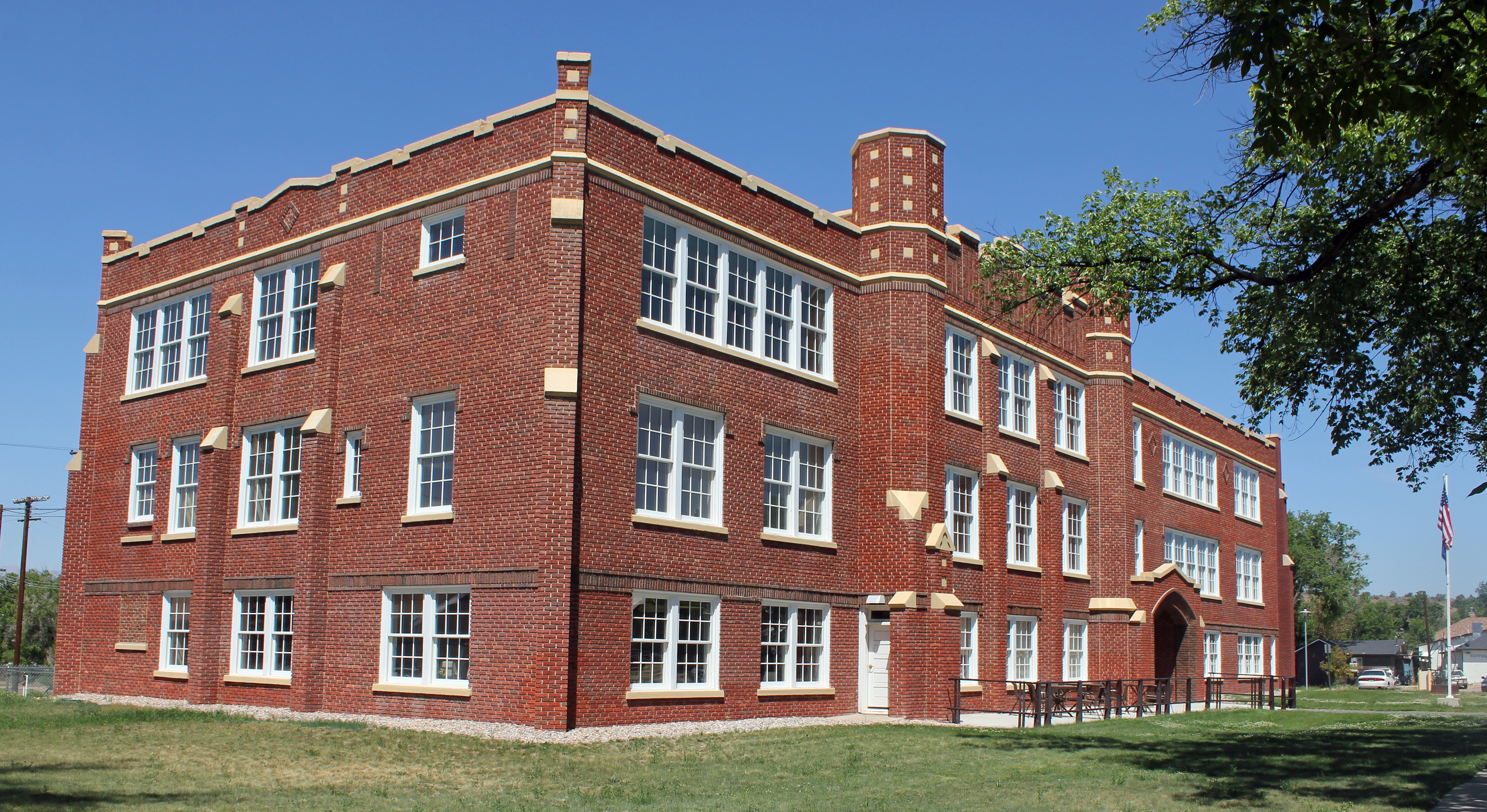

- Location within Colorado Location within the United States
- Location: 415 Walsen Ave., Walsenburg, Colorado
- Coordinates: 37°37′51″N 104°47′12″W
- Area: 1.5 acres (0.61 ha)
- Built: 1920
- Architect: Rapp, Isaac Hamilton; et al.
- Architectural style: Late Gothic Revival
- NRHP reference No.: 05001200
- Added to NRHP: November 2, 2005

Huerfano County High School, at 415 Walsen Ave. in Walsenburg, Colorado, was built in 1920. It was designed in Late Gothic Revival style by architect Isaac Rapp. It has also been known as Walsenburg Middle School and denoted as 5HF.2183. It was listed on the National Register of Historic Places in 2005.

== Current use ==
The building now houses the Walsenburg branch library of the Spanish Peaks Library District.
