= Wayne Anthony Ross =

American attorney residing in Alaska (born 1943)

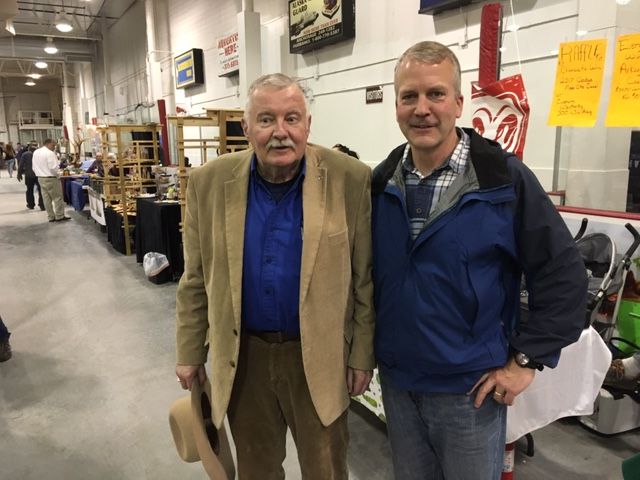
Wayne Anthony Ross and Dan Sullivan at a gun show held at the Ben Boeke Ice Rink in May 2017.

Wayne Anthony Ross (February 25, 1943 - April 18, 2026) was an American attorney residing in Alaska. In 2009, Ross was nominated to be Alaska Attorney General by then Governor Sarah Palin. His nomination was rejected by the Alaska Legislature on April 16, 2009. Ross was a director of the National Rifle Association of America until his death, and previously served as its vice president. Ross died on Saturday, April 18, 2026, at the age of 83.

== Biography ==
Ross has been active in Alaska politics for decades, running in the Republican gubernatorial primaries twice and serving on Palin's gubernatorial campaign. He has been active in lobbying for gun rights and against gun control, and in the pro-life movement.

Ross' nomination to be Alaska Attorney General was controversial. In 1993, he wrote a letter to the state bar association, arguing against a law which would prohibit discrimination based on sexual orientation. In the letter, Ross wrote: "This bill seems to give extra rights to a group whose lifestyle was a crime only a few years ago, and whose beliefs are certainly immoral in the eyes of anyone with some semblance of intelligence and moral character." He went on to describe gay Alaskans as "degenerates" who engage in "sexual perversion". Questioned about these statements during his confirmation hearings, Ross compared his distaste for homosexuals to his distaste for lima beans, and stated that he would uphold state laws regardless of his personal opinions on homosexuality or lima beans. Ultimately, Ross' nomination was rejected by the Alaska Legislature on April 16, 2009, by a vote of 35 – 23, the first time an Alaska Governor's cabinet appointee failed confirmation.

Ross died on Saturday, April 18, 2026, at the age of 83.
