= Ken Fanning =

American politician

Kenneth Fanning

Member of the Alaska House of Representatives from the 20th district
- In office January 12, 1981 – January 17, 1983
- Preceded by: Charlie Parr
- Succeeded by: Niilo Koponen (redistricting)

Member of the Alaska Senate from the K (Seat A) district
- In office December 11, 1987 – January 9, 1989
- Appointed by: Steve Cowper
- Preceded by: Don Bennett
- Succeeded by: Steve Frank

Personal details
- Born: Kenneth James Fanning; April 28, 1947 (age 79) Tampa, Florida, U.S.
- Party: Republican
- Other political affiliations: Libertarian (before 1983)
- Spouse: Jill
- Children: 1
- Education: University of Alaska Fairbanks

Kenneth James Fanning (born April 28, 1947) is an American hunting and fishing guide and former politician. In 1980, Fanning was elected to the Alaska House of Representatives as a Libertarian, becoming the second person elected to a U.S. state legislature under that party, following his political mentor Dick Randolph. Fanning served a single term, losing reelection. He later joined the Republican Party and was appointed to fill out a vacancy in the Alaska Senate in 1987, serving in that body for a little over a year.

== Early life ==
Fanning was born on April 28, 1947, in Tampa, Florida. He studied at Colorado State University from 1966 to 1967, then moved to Alaska. He settled in Fairbanks in 1969, where he studied wildlife management at the University of Alaska (UA) and built a home in the Fairbanks-area suburbs southwest of the university's campus.

After graduating, Fanning worked as a hunting and fishing guide, a trapper, and was also employed at one point by the Alaska Department of Fish and Game. He became involved in politics during the late 1970s through additional work as a consultant and lobbyist on natural resource and wildlife issues. Fanning was the executive director of the Real Alaskan Coalition, which, in 1979, organized the Great Denali-McKinley Trespass to protest the federal government's conservation efforts in Mount McKinley National Park. He gained state-wide notoriety after the protest.

== Political career ==
=== State House ===
Fanning joined the Libertarian Party (LP) in the late 1970s. He became a protege of Dick Randolph, a Fairbanks insurance agent who served as a Republican in the Alaska House from 1971 to 1974, who himself had joined the LP after meeting Roger MacBride in 1976.

Fanning was elected in 1980 to a single term in the Alaska House of Representatives as a Libertarian. He followed Randolph, who won election to the House as a Libertarian in 1978 and was reelected alongside Fanning. Randolph and Fanning represented the Fairbanks North Star Borough as a whole as part of the 20th District, a six-member district without designated seats, coming in first and second respectively. Fanning originally served as a member of the House's minority, and was given a lone committee assignment on the House's Transportation Committee.

During his term in office, redistricting eliminated the system of multi-member, at-large districts. Running for reelection in 1982, his constituency had been drastically altered. Fanning was placed in the single-member 21st District, containing the liberal-leaning western portions of the borough. He lost reelection to the late Democratic challenger Niilo Koponen by a nearly two-to-one margin, in a contest with no Republican nominee.

=== State Senate ===
Fanning was one of a number of Alaska Libertarians who left the party in the wake of the schism revealed during its 1983 national convention, joining the Republican Party. In 1987, Alaska governor Steve Cowper appointed Fanning to a vacancy in the Alaska Senate when Republican incumbent Don Bennett died suddenly at home at age 56. Fanning filled out the remainder of Bennett's term and was not a candidate for election to a full term.

== Life after politics ==
Ken Fanning was married to Jill Kathleen Fanning (1948–2006), who was involved in the real estate business in Fairbanks.

Fanning assumed the management of a hunting and fishing lodge in Yakutat, Alaska, before his election to the House. Following his Senate tenure, he moved to Yakutat permanently, and he eventually became the owner of the business. Most of the lodge's business has centered on fishing excursions in the Situk River. He later began spending winters in Puerto Vallarta, Mexico, where he was involved in the management of a bar.

== Quote ==
- "One of the great things about hunting and fishing and trapping, particularly in Alaska, is that you are frequently in areas that are beyond the reach of the law. There's a moral judgment to be made between you and the animal and God."

== Bibliography ==
- (with John Manly) Behind The Scenes in the Alaska Legislature, 1982
