= Carl E. Moses =

American politician

Carl Eugene Moses (July 16, 1929 – April 30, 2014) was an American businessman from Unalaska, Alaska who served in the Alaska House of Representatives from 1965 to 1973 as both a Republican and Democrat, and was elected again to the House in 1992 running on the Alaskan Independence Party ticket, later switched back to the Democrats, and served until 2007. Moses served a total of eleven full terms in the Alaska House, making him the longest-serving member in the history of that body. In the 2006 primary election, Moses was defeated for renomination by Bryce Edgmon, losing via a coin toss after the election results wound up in court and were later certified by the state of Alaska as ending in a tie vote.

== Early life ==
Carl Eugene Moses was born on July 16, 1929, in Santa Cruz, California, of mixed Aleut and German heritage. He moved to Pauloff Harbor, Alaska, in 1933. He attended Edison Tech from 1954 to 1957, and the University of Washington. He spent two years in the United States Army, and in 1960 moved to King Cove, Alaska. In 1966 he moved to Unalaska, and started a business called Carl's Commercial Co., eventually including a store, hotel and bar, of which he was owner and operator; in 1977, this was to become Carl's Inc., of which he remained president.

== Political career ==
Moses served on the King Cove City Council from 1963 to 1964. In 1964 he was elected to the 12th Alaska House district as a Republican, defeating Democrat Niels P. Thomson 503 to 326 to replace Democratic incumbent Arthur J. Harris In 1966 he served a term on the Alaska Rural Housing Board, and was re-elected to the House over former Democratic State Representative Charles J. Franz, 461 to 357. In 1968 he again defeated Franz, 461-388. By 1970, alienated like other Alaska Republicans such as Wally Hickel by the Nixon administration, he had switched to the Democratic Party, and was re-elected without opposition. In 1972, after a redistricting, he was replaced by fellow Democratic incumbent Edward F. Naughton. In 1973, he was appointed to a seat on the Alaska Department of Fish and Game Board.

=== Return to the House ===
In 1992, Moses was elected to the 40th House district on the Alaskan Independence Party ticket, defeating Democrat Dennis Robinson 1829 votes to 1600. He switched his party affiliation back to the Democratic Party on May 24, 1994 (at around the same time that incumbent Governor Wally Hickel, also elected on the AIP ticket, returned to the Republicans), and continued to serve in the House, winning races as a Democrat with 87% of the vote or more until the 2004 election, which he won with 2652 votes to 1527 for his Republican opponent.

In August 2006, an ill Moses returned to Juneau to cast a critical vote that insured passage of a bill giving tax breaks to the oil industry, shortly after receiving campaign contributions from Bill Allen and five other VECO executives, the only Democrat to receive any from that source.

=== Coin toss loss ===
In the 2006 Democratic primary election for the House seat, Moses was tied with Bryce Edgmon at 767 votes each. There was a coin toss to determine the winner, and Moses lost. Moses ran a write-in campaign against Edgmon and Republican nominee Ron Bowers. Edgmon won, with 2020 votes to 950 for Moses and 812 for Bowers. In 2019, Edgmon was elected by a bipartisan majority coalition as House Speaker and was the first Alaska Native to hold the position.

== The Aleut Corporation ==
Moses served from 1974 to 1978 as President of The Aleut Corporation. In December 1978, a court ruled that Moses had orchestrated "inaccurate, false and misleading statements" during the April 1977 election for corporate directors, and ordered a new election. Moses eventually resigned his position as president, and was later sued by the Corporation for an alleged conspiracy involving unwise real estate purchases in a subdivision. In 2008 Moses began a new term on the Corporation's board of directors.

== Death ==
Carl Moses died April 30, 2014, in Sand Point, Alaska, at age 84.

Alaska House of Representatives
Preceded by Arthur J. Harris	Member of the Alaska House of Representatives from the 12th district 1965–1973	Succeeded by Edward F. Naughton
Preceded by District created	Member of the Alaska House of Representatives from the 40th district 1993–2003	Succeeded by Reggie Joule
Preceded by Reggie Joule	Member of the Alaska House of Representatives from the 37th district 2003–2007	Succeeded by Bryce Edgmon
