= Republican Moderate Party of Alaska =

- Founder: Ray Metcalfe
- Founded: 1986; 40 years ago
- Dissolved: 2008; 18 years ago
- Headquarters: Anchorage, Alaska
- Membership (March 4, 2019): 73
- Ideology: Religious freedom
- Political position: Center
- Colors: Vivid Red

The Republican Moderate Party of Alaska was a political party in Alaska formed by Ray Metcalfe in 1986 as an alternative to what Metcalfe perceived to be a Republican Party dominated by the religious right.

== History ==
In 1986 former Republican state legislator Ray Metcalfe chose to run against Jan Faiks, who had defeated him in 1982, as an independent under the "Republican Moderate" ballot line which was approved by the state in June. Shortly before the election the Alaska Republican Party attempted to have a court remove him from the ballot stating that it would confuse voters, however the assistant attorney general stated that it was late for the Republicans to challenge his ballot access. On September 17, 1986, the Alaskan Republican Party filed a lawsuit to remove Metcalfe from the ballot and bar him from using "Republican" in his party name, but they were rejected and Metcalfe was allowed to stay on the ballot. The Republicans attempted to appeal to the state supreme court, but the court refused to hear their case. Metcalfe was later defeated by Faiks for a second time and only took 34.27% of the vote.

Only one candidate has ever won an election, a 2002 race for the state senate; however, Thomas Wagoner re-affiliated with the Republican Party the day after the election. The Republican Moderate Party has extensive litigation-related history, due in no small part to its minor party status. After a record of success in the 1990s, its support has slowly dwindled, ending with just 0.63% of the 2002 gubernatorial election. State law requires that 3% of registered voters vote for a party or be registered to it for recognition. A court challenge initially overturned this law, holding that it was more restrictive than what the state required of independent candidates, but resulted in the original law being upheld by the Alaska Supreme Court on the grounds that a party candidate has more impact than an independent candidate. The party has since been recognized by the state again. As of October 2010 there were 2,719 members statewide. As of January 2011, the Republican Moderate Party is no longer classified as a political party but rather as a political group.

== Actions towards Ben Stevens ==
The party and its founder have been one of the major voices of criticism toward Ben Stevens, former state senate president and son of US Senator Ted Stevens. Allegations of collusion with oil companies and bribery ran for years, culminating with an FBI raid on the state senator's office and his retirement from public life.

== Electoral performance ==
=== Gubernatorial ===
Year	Gubernatorial nominee	Votes	Change
1998	Ray Metcalfe	13,540 (6.15%)	Steady
2002	Raymond VinZant	1,506 (0.65%)	▼5.50%
