= Dick Randolph =

American politician

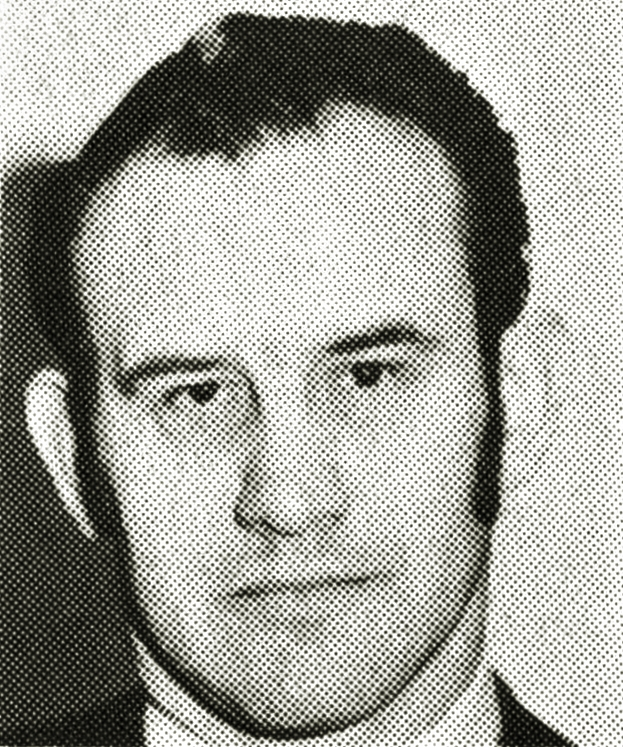

Member of the Alaska House of Representatives
- In office 1979–1983
- Succeeded by: John Ringstad
- Constituency: 20th district
- In office 1971–1975
- Constituency: 16th district (1971‍–‍1973); 17th district (1973‍–‍1975)

Personal details
- Born: April 10, 1936 (age 90) Salmon, Idaho, U.S.
- Party: Republican; Libertarian (c. 1976‍–‍1985)

Richard L. Randolph (born April 10, 1936) is a longtime insurance agency owner in Fairbanks, Alaska who is best known as the first person to be elected to partisan office under the banner of the Libertarian Party with his election to the Alaska House of Representatives in 1978. He was re-elected in 1980. After Alaska greatly increased its revenue from the development of oil, Randolph advocated the repeal of the state income tax. The effort was successful, with Alaska being one of only two states where residents pay neither an income nor a sales tax—the other being New Hampshire. He was also the LP's gubernatorial nominee in 1982, garnering nearly 15 percent of the vote.

== Career ==
Dick Randolph was born in Salmon, Idaho and graduated from Idaho State College in 1960 with a B.A. in education. He moved to Alaska that same year to become a teacher, spending several years doing such in Valdez and South Naknek. He moved to Fairbanks in 1964 and founded a State Farm Insurance agency, becoming its top sales agent in the nation in 1965. He also served as the state president and national vice-president for the Jaycees before entering politics.

== Politics ==
Randolph was elected to the Alaska House of Representatives as a Republican in the 1970 election. He was re-elected in 1972, but did not seek re-election in 1974, likely in protest of financial reporting laws which had just been enacted. A number of fellow legislators, also self-employed, had resigned from the legislature around this same time.

Randolph managed Roger MacBride's presidential campaign in Alaska during the 1976 presidential election.

Running as a Libertarian in 1978 Randolph finished fifth out of 17 candidates, taking one of the six State House seats in District 20. He was re-elected in 1980, coming in first out of 18 candidates, with his fellow Libertarian Ken Fanning taking 4th and giving the Alaska LP two of the six seats in District 20. Randolph supported repealing Alaska's income tax in 1980. He declined to seek reelection in the 1982 election.

In May 1981, Randolph announced that he would run in the 1982 gubernatorial election. Randolph and his running mate Donnis Thompson received nearly 15% of the vote. He spent $500,000 during the campaign.

Randolph declined to run for the 1980 Libertarian presidential nomination after having his name put forward for the nomination by the then-chair of the Libertarian Party of Hawaii, and Ed Clark went on to become the party's presidential nominee.
