= Thomas Wagoner =

American politician (born 1942)

Tom Wagoner

Member of the Alaska Senate from the Q district
- In office January 21, 2003 – January 15, 2013
- Preceded by: Jerry Ward
- Succeeded by: Peter Micciche

Personal details
- Born: September 19, 1942 (age 83) Pylesville, Maryland, U.S.
- Party: Republican
- Other political affiliations: Republican Moderate (2002)
- Education: Eastern Washington University; University of Alaska Anchorage

Thomas H. Wagoner (born September 19, 1942) is an American politician and businessman who served in the Alaska Senate from 2003 until 2013.

== Biography ==
Wagoner was born in 1942 in Pylesville, Maryland. He graduated with a BA in technical design from Eastern Washington University in 1966, and with a BA in education from there in 1969, later becoming a teacher in Kenai, Alaska. He later graduated with an MA from the University of Alaska Anchorage in 1980. Wagoner has owned Wagoner Enterprises since 1977, Wagoner Rental Properties since 1988, and Cook Inlet Stone Products since 1992. He formerly owned Wagoner's Seamless Flooring from 1967 until 1968; Wagoner's Flooring from 1971 until 1975; and the Peninsula Flooring Center from 1986 until 1993.

Wagoner served on the Kenai Harbor Committee from 1978 until 1980, on the Kenai City Council from 1980 until 1983, and as Mayor of Kenai from 1983 until 1986. He later served on the Alaska Post Secondary Committee from 1992 until 1994. Wagoner unsuccessfully ran for the Alaska House of Representatives in 1986, losing to incumbent Democrat Mike Navarre.

=== Alaska Senate ===
In 2002, Wagoner, a former Republican, ran for the Alaska Senate from District Q as a member of the Republican Moderate Party. It was initially a four-way race between him, Democrat Pat Hawkins, Green Party candidate Thomas Stroman, and incumbent Republican Jerry Ward; however Hawkins dropped out shortly before the election and endorsed Wagoner in an effort to unseat Ward. Wagoner was also endorsed by state Senator John Torgerson. He won the election by a 1-point margin over Ward, but re-registered as a Republican the day after the election.

Wagoner was challenged by Ward in the 2004 Republican primary, but he won 47%–37%, with Scott D. Hamann taking 16%. He easily won the general election over independent candidate Robert E. Merchant, taking 77% of the vote. Wagoner won the 2008 Republican primary over Jim Kauffman, and the general election over Democrat Nels Anderson. In 2012, he was redistricted to District O and was defeated in the primary by Peter Micciche, 59%–41%.

== Personal life ==
Wagoner and his wife, Dorothy, have 2 children: Denise and Dawn.
