= Robin L. Taylor =

American politician (born 1943)

Robin Taylor
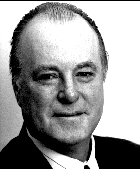

Member of the Alaska Senate from the A district
- In office June 10, 1992 – September 15, 2003
- Preceded by: Lloyd Jones
- Succeeded by: Bert Stedman

Member of the Alaska House of Representatives from the 1st district
- In office January 14, 1985 – June 10, 1992; Seat A
- Preceded by: Ron Wendte
- Succeeded by: Carroll Fader

Personal details
- Born: February 5, 1943 (age 83) Sedro-Woolley, Washington, U.S.
- Party: Republican
- Spouse: Kaye Marie
- Children: 2
- Education: University of Washington, Seattle (BA); Western Oregon University (MA); Willamette University (JD)

Robin L. Taylor (born February 5, 1943) is a lawyer from the U.S. state of Alaska. He has also served as a judge, government administrator and Republican Party politician. It is in this latter capacity that he is best known. Taylor served in the Alaska Legislature from 1985 to 2003. Running for governor of Alaska in 1998 in a blanket primary, Taylor was outpolled by John Lindauer for the Republican nomination. When questions arose over the source of Lindauer's campaign monies, Taylor reemerged as a write-in candidate for the office backed by the Republican Party of Alaska, who had disowned Lindauer. While Taylor outpolled Lindauer in the general election, both candidacies fell far behind that of incumbent Tony Knowles, who was elected to a second term.

== Early life ==
Robin L. Taylor was born in Sedro Woolley, Washington on February 5, 1943. Taylor moved to Ketchikan, Alaska in 1961 and later began college studies, earning a B.A. from the University of Washington in 1965, an M.A. from the Oregon College of Education in 1966 and a J.D. from Willamette University in 1969.

Taylor served on the Ketchikan city council and Ketchikan Gateway Borough assembly from 1973 to 1976, including as vice-mayor of the city from 1974 to 1975. Taylor was appointed to a Wrangell-based judgeship of the Alaska District Court by governor Jay Hammond on December 23, 1976, besting one other applicant. He subsequently moved to Wrangell, where he resides today.

Taylor served as a district judge in Alaska from 1977 to 1982, a representative in the Alaska State Legislature from 1984 to 1992, and as a senator in the Alaska State Legislature from 1992 to 1998.

== 1998 gubernatorial campaign ==
In 1998, Democratic incumbent Governor of Alaska Tony Knowles ran for re-election against newspaper publisher John Howard Lindauer, the Republican nominee. Controversy surrounding Lindauer's misrepresentation of information in campaign finance documents, his strong anti-gay rights stances, and whether he met the residency requirements caused his campaign to nearly collapse. One week before the election, Taylor announced that he was launching a write-in campaign as an alternative Republican candidate for governor. Taylor split the Republican vote with Lindauer, earning 18.26% to his 17.86%. Knowles was re-elected in a landslide.

== Later career ==
He was also appointed deputy commissioner of the Alaska Department of Transportation and Public Facilities by then-Governor of Alaska Frank H. Murkowski and served until Alaska Governor Sarah Palin decided to replace him with Dennis L. Hardy in February 2007.

Party political offices
Preceded by Jim Campbell	Republican nominee for Governor of Alaska; 1998 (endorsed); Served alongside: John Lindauer (disavowed)	Succeeded by Frank Murkowski
