= Jerry Mackie (politician) =

American businessman and politician

Member of the Alaska Senate from the C district
- In office 1997–2000
- Preceded by: Fred Zharoff
- Succeeded by: Alan Austerman

Member of the Alaska House of Representatives from the 5th district
- In office 1991–1996
- Preceded by: Claude Everett Swackhammer
- Succeeded by: Albert Kookesh

Personal details
- Born: January 10, 1962 (age 64) Ketchikan, Alaska, U.S.
- Party: Republican (1998–present); Democratic (1990–1998)
- Spouse: Jeannie

Jerry Mackie (born January 10, 1962) is a former American businessman and politician.

Born in Ketchikan, Alaska, Mackie graduated from Ketchikan High School in 1980. He owned the Sunnahae Lodge in Craig, Alaska. Mackie served in the Alaska House of Representatives from 1991 to 1996 and was a Democrat. He then served in the Alaska Senate from 1997 to 2000.
