= Green Party of Alaska =

Political party in Alaska

- Chairperson: Robert Shields
- Headquarters: 145 Marten Dr. Fairbanks, Alaska 99712
- Registered voters (2026): 1,458
- Ideology: Green politics
- National affiliation: None (2021–present; 1990–2000); Green Party (2001–2021)
- Colors
- Alaska Senate: 0 / 20
- Alaska House of Representatives: 0 / 40
- U.S. Senate (Alaska): 0 / 2
- U.S. House of Representatives (Alaska): 0 / 1
- Other elected officials: 0 (June 2024)

Website
- alaska-greens.org

The Green Party of Alaska (GPAK) is a political party in the U.S. state of Alaska. It was the Alaska affiliate of the Green Party of the United States from 2001 until 2021. Alaska was the first state in which the Green Party gained ballot access when Jim Sykes ran for governor of Alaska in 1990. Sykes had previously filed a ballot access lawsuit, citing an earlier case, Vogler v. Miller.

In 2020, the leadership of the Green Party of Alaska refused to place Green Party nominees Howie Hawkins and Angela Nicole Walker on the ballot and instead draft-nominated a ticket with Jesse Ventura for president and Cynthia McKinney for vice-president. McKinney accepted the vice-presidential nomination. Because of this, the Green Party of the United States national committee voted in January 2021 to decertify the GPAK.

== Issues ==
The Green Party of Alaska is opposed to industrial oil development in the Arctic National Wildlife Refuge. It supports the development of alternative fuels and energy sources such as wind power and solar power.

The party supports a national single-payer healthcare system. The 2025 list of priorities formally incorporates principles of permaculture and states that the party will support any campaign that recognizes "the positive impact Star Trek has had on our global culture in showing a possible future of peace and abundance."

== History ==
=== Early history (1990–2020) ===
==== Ballot status ====
The Green Party first gained ballot access in 1990, but lost its Recognized Political Party status in 2002. Ballot access was regained in 2003 based on a court order, lost again in 2005, and regained in February 2006 when Superior Court Judge Stephanie Joannides issued a preliminary injunction against the State of Alaska, preventing the state from denying access to the Green Party. On June 3, 2007 a lower Alaska state court upheld Alaska's new definition of "political party" and the Green Party of Alaska was removed from the ballot. The judge wrote that she had to uphold the new definition of "political party", because the Alaska Supreme Court had upheld the old definition of "political party" on November 17, 2006.

In 2005, the party sued the State of Alaska over the issue of joint primary ballots; the Green Party won in the Supreme Court of Alaska.

In 2012, the Alaska Green party put forth a statewide petition, seeking status as a "limited political party" which would allow them to put names on the ballot for presidential and vice-presidential candidates. A total of 3,273 signatures is needed in Alaska to qualify as a limited political party. The Alaskan Greens submitted approximately 4,500 signatures.

=== Decertification by GPUS (2020–present) ===
In late 2020, the Alaska Green Party broke from the Green Party of the United States and nominated former Governor of Minnesota Jesse Ventura and former U.S. Representative and 2008 Green Party presidential nominee Cynthia McKinney for president and vice president respectively, instead of Howie Hawkins and Angela Nicole Walker. The Ventura–McKinney ticket received 2,673 (0.74%) votes.

In January 2021, as the result of breaking with the GPUS, the GPAK was officially decertified; as a result, it is no longer the Alaskan state party chapter of the GPUS. The GPUS has begun the process of replacing it with a new GPAK.

In response to decertification, a faction of GPAK formed the internal pressure group Grassroots Green Party of Alaska, seeking to regain control of the party from the current leadership

== Organization ==
Name	Position
Robert Shields	Chair
Joshua Hadley	Treasurer

== Elections ==
The Green Party of Alaska has gained more than 10% of the votes in past presidential and congressional elections. The most notable example was in 2000, when Alaska voters gave presidential candidate Ralph Nader his highest state percentage. Nader made headlines when he carried the Girdwood precinct, located at the extreme southern end of Anchorage corporate limits. In 1996, the party's U.S. Senate nominee Jed Whittaker came in second, out-polling Democratic nominee Theresa Obermeyer, who had been disowned by her party.

The first election victory associated with the Alaska Green party was in 1991, when environmentalist Kelly Weaverling was elected mayor of Cordova, then a town of about 2,500. Weaverling had previously drawn national attention for his work in the aftermath of the March 1989 Exxon Valdez oil spill in the Prince William Sound. Municipal elections in Alaska are nonpartisan, though Weaverling's association with the party was highly publicized at the time.

Presidential election results
Election	Presidential candidate	Vice-presidential candidate	Votes	%	±%
1996	Ralph Nader	Winona LaDuke	7,597	3.14%	N/A
2000	Ralph Nader	Winona LaDuke	28,747	10.07%	+6.93
2004	David Cobb	Pat LaMarche	1,058	0.34%	–9.73
2008	Cynthia McKinney	Rosa Clemente	Unknown (Note: In the 2008 United States presidential election in Alaska, the Green Party did not have ballot access. Any votes cast for Cynthia McKinney were only processed as "write-in", making it impossible to know how many votes she received.)		
2012	Jill Stein	Cheri Honkala	2,917	0.97%	
2016	Jill Stein	Ajamu Baraka	5,735	1.80%	
2020	Jesse Ventura	Cynthia McKinney	2,673	0.74%	
2024	Jasmine Sherman	Tanda BluBear	Not on ballot		

Governor election results
Election	Candidate	Votes	Percentage	±%
1990	Jim Sykes	6,563	3.37	N/A
1994	Jim Sykes	8,727	4.09	+0.70
1998	Jim Sykes	2,251	2.06	–2.03
2002	Diane Benson	2,926	1.26	–1.70
2006	David Massie	593	0.25	–1.00

== See also ==
- List of State Green Parties
- Politics of Alaska
- Government of Alaska
- Elections in Alaska
- Political party strength in Alaska

== Sources ==
- Alaska Division of Elections.
- Green Party Election Results. Wayback Machine
