= Alaskan Independence Party =

- Chairperson: John Wayne Howe
- Founder: Joe Vogler
- Founded: 1973 (as Alaskans for Independence); June 14, 1984; 42 years ago
- Dissolved: December 7, 2025
- Succeeded by: Alaskan Party
- Registered voters (2025): ▲19,117 (at dissolution)
- Ideology: Alaskan nationalism Libertarian conservatism Social conservatism Right-wing populism Economic liberalism
- Colors: Blue; Gold

Website
- www.akip.org

The Alaskan Independence Party (AIP) was an Alaskan nationalist political party in the United States that advocated for an in-state referendum which would include the option of Alaska becoming an independent country. The party embraced a right wing libertarian ideology that supported gun rights, direct democracy, privatization, homeschooling, abolishing federal land ownership, and limited government.

Wally Hickel was elected as the Governor of Alaska in 1990 under the Independence Party, making it one of the few third parties to have controlled a governor's seat; however, Hickel transferred to the Republican Party before the 1994 election.

On December 7, 2025, the AIP's board voted to dissolve the party. In response, former party chair Bob Bird formed a successor party called Alaskan Party.

== History ==
=== Founding and early history ===
In early 1973, Joe Vogler founded Alaskans for Independence (AFI), originally to label a petition drive. Vogler wrote to local Alaskan newspapers and argued against the Alaskan statehood vote. In 1973, Vogler began circulating a petition seeking support for secession of Alaska from the United States. The Alaska magazine published a piece at that time in which Vogler claimed to have gathered 25,000 signatures in three weeks.

In 1978, Vogler merged the AFI into the Alaskan Independence Party (AIP), a political party.

During the first decade of its existence, the Party was used exclusively by Vogler for his first two campaigns for governor and campaign for lieutenant governor. Vogler would serve as the AIP's standard-bearer for most of the party's first two decades. The party maintained its recognized status afterward, first by maintaining thresholds in gubernatorial elections, then through same with voter registration.

Vogler described himself as a "separatist", but the AIP's platform did not explicitly call for secession. Referring to Alaska's 1959 admission to the union, the AIP's charter stated that "The Alaskan Independence Party's goal is the vote we were entitled to in 1958, one choice from among the following four choices:

1. Remain a territory.
2. Become a separate and independent country.
3. Accept commonwealth status.
4. Become a state.

Members of the AIP, including Vogler, alleged that the 1958 referendum on Alaskan statehood was rigged by the federal government.

On multiple occasions, Vogler called for violence against the federal government. For instance, Vogler once said, "God, I hate those sons of bitches. If I ever get a revolution going, I'm going to import a bunch of guillotines and lop off their lying heads." In a 1991 interview, Vogler said "And you say the hell with [government]. And you renounce allegiance, and you pledge your efforts, your effects, your honor, your life to Alaska." While the Chair of the AIP Vogler had a dispute with the Bureau of Land Management (BLM), resulting in a stand-off with BLM officers and a lawsuit against Vogler by the BLM.

Vogler's running mate in 1986 was Al Rowe, a Fairbanks resident and former Alaska State Trooper. Rowe took out a series of newspaper ads, fashioning himself in the image of Sheriff Buford Pusser. These ads were a major attention getter during the race. Between Rowe's ads and the turmoil existing in the Republican Party over the nomination of Arliss Sturgulewski, the AIP gained 5.2 percent of the vote, becoming a recognized party in Alaska for the first time.

=== Late 20th-century ===
Map of the 1990 Alaska gubernatorial election, with boroughs won by Wally Hickel in yellow

In 1990, former Republican governor Walter Joseph Hickel won the election for governor as a member of the Alaskan Independence Party, with Jack Coghill as his running mate. This was the first time since Alaska joined the union that a third-party candidate has been elected governor, until the election of Jesse Ventura in Minnesota in 1998, and then Bill Walker in Alaska in 2014. Hickel refused a vote on secession called on by a fringe group within the AIP loyal to Vogler's original vision. He rejoined the Republican Party in 1994, with eight months remaining in his term.

Carl E. Moses, a businessman from Unalaska who had served in the Alaska House of Representatives from 1965 to 1973 as both a Republican and Democrat, was elected again to the House in 1992, running under the AIP banner. He was elected to a district comprising mostly the area between the Aleutian Islands and Bristol Bay. He switched his party affiliation back to Democratic at around the same time that Hickel switched, and continued to serve in the House until 2007.

The party did not get involved in presidential elections until 1992, when it endorsed Howard Phillips, the candidate of the U.S. Taxpayers Party (now the Constitution Party).

=== Post-Vogler ===
Mark Chryson, the former Chair of the AIP, in 2008 said that "the Confederate states [should] have been allowed to separate and go their peaceful ways...The War of Northern Aggression, or the Civil War, or the War Between the States -- however you want to refer to it -- was not about slavery, it was about states' rights."

The chairmanship of the AIP came to Lynette Clark about 2004. Also joining around 2001 was anti-abortion activist and conservative public school teacher Bob Bird, who was a Pat Buchanan delegate at the 1996 GOP convention. Bird had run against Ted Stevens in the 1990 primary, when he first met Vogler. Bird's strong showing against Stevens, coupled with his friendship with one of statehood founders Jack Coghill, encouraged Hickel and Coghill to join the AIP.

Bird assumed the role of Acting Chairman until he was confirmed at a Wasilla convention that fall, and continued as chairman at the Kenai convention in 2022.

The Alaskan Independence Party sued the state of Alaska in 2020, seeking to overturn the results from a referendum where ranked-choice voting was implemented in Alaska's general elections.

The AIP embraced a "traditional family" message in the early 21st-century. Chryson said the AIP is "for the traditional family -- daddy, mommy, kids." The party opposed the legalization of same-sex marriage.

==== 2006 ballot initiative ====
In 2006, members of the AIP collected the 100 signatures needed to place on the fall ballot an initiative calling for Alaska to secede from the union or, if that was found not to be legally possible, directing the state to work to make secession legal. However, in the case of Kohlhaas v. State the Alaska State Supreme Court ruled any attempt at secession to be unconstitutional and the initiative was not approved to appear on the fall ballot.

=== Dissolution ===
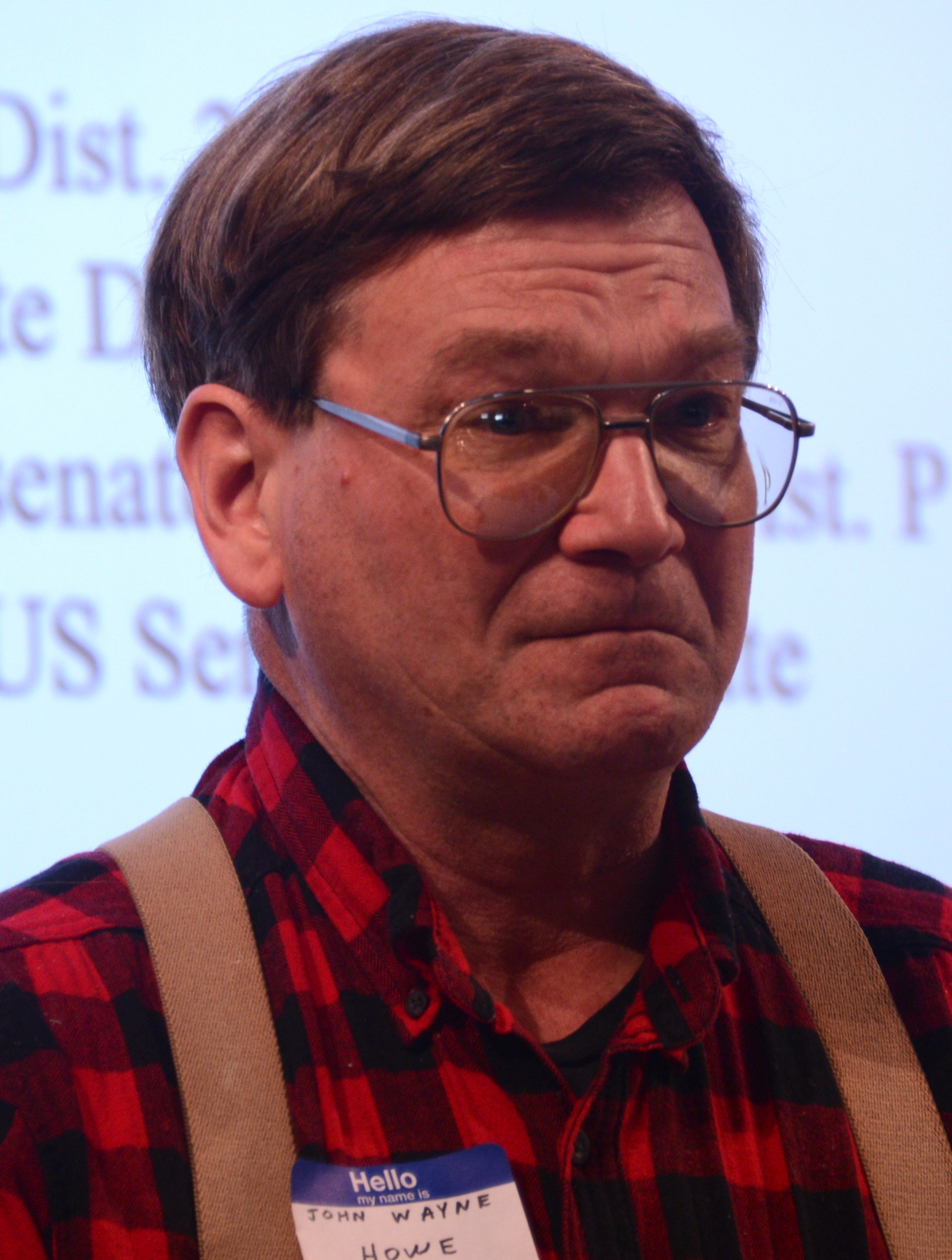
John Wayne Howe, the final chair of the Alaskan Independence Party

On December 7, 2025, the AIP's three member board, led by party chair John Wayne Howe, voted to dissolve the party. Party leadership felt that the party had "for some time been legally alive yet spiritually dead,” mentioning Hickel's involvement in the party and Vogler's death as factors that had caused the party to lose sight of its mission. They also cited a lack of interest or involvement from the party's roughly 19,000 members, stating that many members had registered with the party by mistake while attempting to register as independents.

Former party chair Bob Bird opposed the dissolution and stated that he would attempt to restore the party. Following unsuccessful efforts to persuade state officials to postpone the AIP's dissolution, Bird formed the new Alaskan Party as a successor.

== Registered members ==
In May 2009, the party had 13,119 registered members. As of May 2021, a press release on the AIP website indicated that the number of registered members has grown to nearly 19,000, making it the state's third largest party and about a quarter the size of the state's Democratic party (Republicans had 124,892 members and the Democrats had 75,047).

At the time of its dissolution, the party had 19,117 registered members. The Alaska Division of Elections stated that these voters would be notified of the party's dissolution, and would have 30 days after receiving notice to register with another party. After 30 days, their affiliation would be changed to "Undeclared".

On September 2, 2008, the Alaska Division of Elections had records that Todd Palin, husband of Governor Sarah Palin (a Republican and vice-presidential candidate), had registered as a member of the Alaskan Independence Party in 1995. He remained registered with the party until 2002. David Niewert and Max Blumenthal wrote in Salon about the third party's influence in gaining election of Sarah Palin as mayor of Wasilla in her first political office.

== Electoral history ==
=== Presidential elections ===
Alaskan Independence Party Presidential Tickets
| Year | Nominee | Running Mate | # Votes | % Votes | Place | Notes |
|---|---|---|---|---|---|---|
| 1992 | Howard Phillips | Albion Knight | 377 | 0.2 / 100 | 8th | |
| 2004 | Michael Peroutka | Chuck Baldwin | 2,092 | 0.7 / 100 | 4th | |
| 2008 | Chuck Baldwin | Darrell Castle | 1,660 | 0.5 / 100 | 4th | |

=== U.S. Senate elections ===
Alaskan Independence Party U.S. Senate Nominees
| Year | Nominee | # Votes | % Votes | Place | Notes |
|---|---|---|---|---|---|
| 2002 | Jim Dore | 6,724 | 2.9 / 100 | 4th | |
| 2004 | Jerry Sanders | 3,785 | 1.2 / 100 | 4th | |
| 2008 | Bob Bird | 13,197 | 4.2 / 100 | 3rd | |
| 2020 | John Wayne Howe | 16,806 | 4.7 / 100 | 3rd | |
| 2022 (primary) | Joe Stephens | 799 | 0.4 / 100 | 11th | |
| 2022 (primary) | Dustin Darden | 646 | 0.3 / 100 | 13th | |

=== U.S. House elections ===
Alaskan Independence Party U.S. House Nominees
| Year | Nominee | # Votes | % Votes | Place | Notes |
|---|---|---|---|---|---|
| 1992 | Michael States | 15,049 | 6.3 / 100 | 3rd | |
| 1996 | William Nemec II | 5,017 | 2.2 / 100 | 3rd | |
| 2000 | Jim Dore | 10,085 | 3.7 / 100 | 4th | |
| 2008 | Don Wright | 14,274 | 4.5 / 100 | 3rd | |
| 2022 (special) (primary) | John Wayne Howe | 380 | 0.2 / 100 | 16th | |
| 2024 (primary) | John Wayne Howe | 621 | 0.6 / 100 | 5th | |
| 2024 (general) | John Wayne Howe | 13,010 | 3.9 / 100 | 3rd | |

=== Gubernatorial elections ===
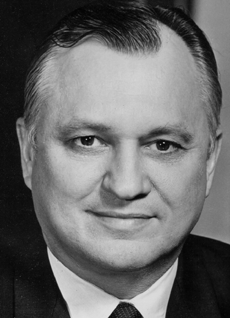
Governor Wally Hickel, the only AIP candidate to win a statewide election.

Alaskan Independence Party Gubernatorial Tickets
| Year | Nominee | Running Mate | # Votes | % Votes | Place | Notes |
|---|---|---|---|---|---|---|
| 1974 | Joe Vogler | Wayne Peppler | 4,770 | 5.0 / 100 | 3rd | |
| 1978 | Don Wright | Joe Vogler | 2,463 | 1.9 / 100 | 5th | |
| 1982 | Joe Vogler | Roger Dee Roberts | 3,235 | 1.7 / 100 | 4th | |
| 1986 | Joe Vogler | Al Rowe | 10,013 | 5.6 / 100 | 3rd | |
| 1990 | Wally Hickel | Jack Coghill | 75,721 | 38.9 / 100 | 1st | |
| 1994 | Jack Coghill | Margaret Ward | 27,838 | 13.0 / 100 | 3rd | |
| 1998 | Sylvia Sullivan | None | 4,238 | 1.9 / 100 | 6th | |
| 2002 | Don Wright | Daniel DeNardo | 2,185 | 0.9 / 100 | 4th | |
| 2006 | Don Wright | Doug Welton | 1,285 | 0.5 / 100 | 4th | |
| 2010 | Don Wright | None | 4,775 | 1.9 / 100 | 3rd | |
| 2022 (primary) | John Wayne Howe | Shellie Wyatt | 1,696 | 0.9 / 100 | 6th | |

=== State legislative ===
Alaskan Independence Party State Legislative Tickets
| Year | District | Nominee | # Votes | % Votes | Place | Notes |
|---|---|---|---|---|---|---|
| 1988 | HD 24 | Ernest Holmberg | 1,393 | 44.9 / 100 | 2nd | |
| 1992 | SD T | William Kristovich | 3,467 | 45.5 / 100 | 2nd | |
| 1992 | HD 40 | Carl E. Moses | 1,829 | 53.1 / 100 | 1st | |
| 2004 | HD 17 | Nick Begich Jr. | 2,965 | 35.9 / 100 | 2nd | |
| 2022 | HD 39 | Tyler L. Ivanoff | 1,766 | 48.4 / 100 | 2nd | |
| 2024 | HD 39 | Tyler L. Ivanoff | 1,670 | 41.6 / 100 | 2nd | |

For other AKIP candidates who earned more than 5.0% of the vote in state legislative races, see List of third-party and independent performances in Alaska state legislative elections.

== Notable party officials ==
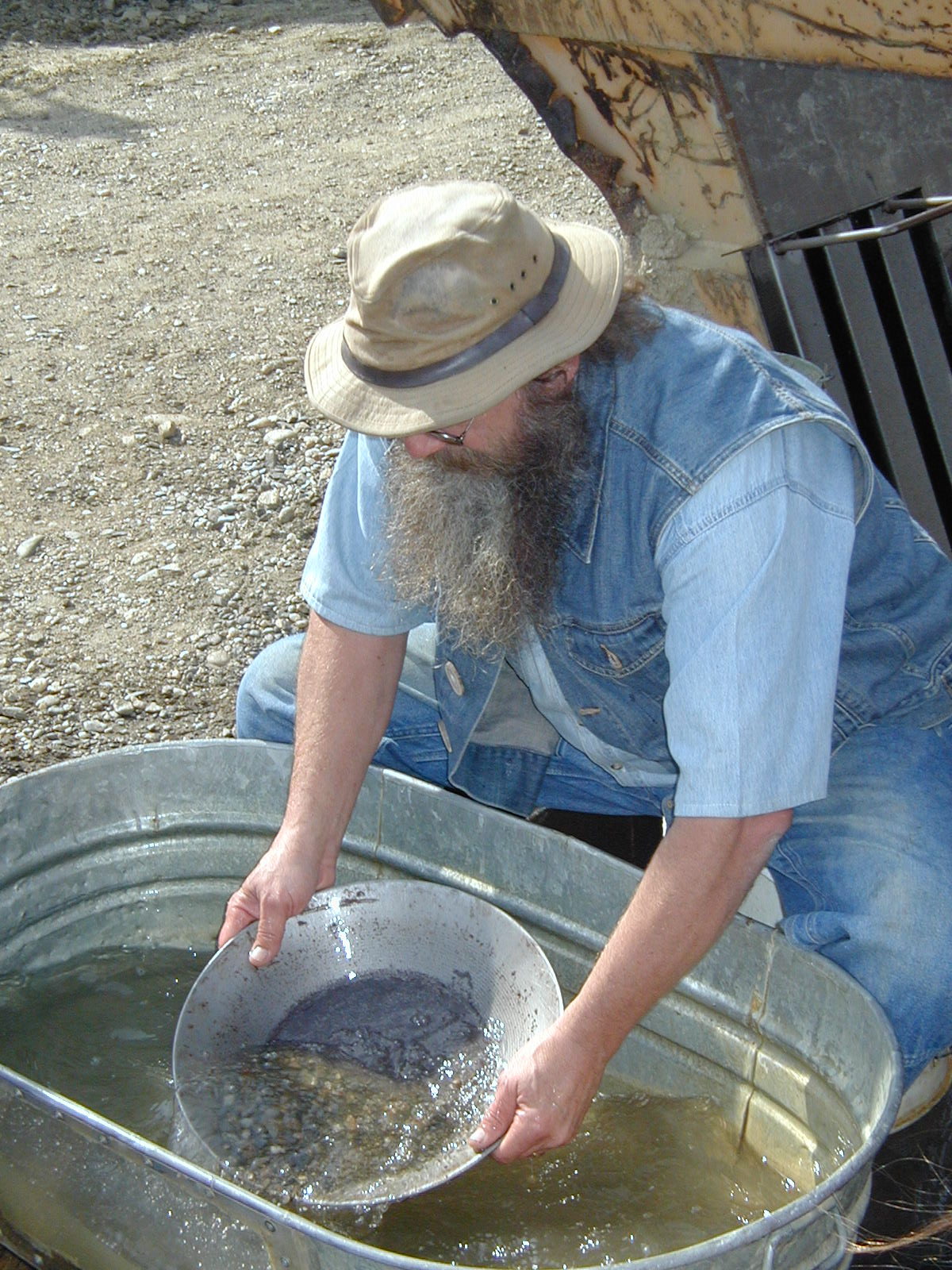
Dexter Clark, shown in May 2002 demonstrating gold panning to tourists at the El Dorado Gold Mine, is a former chairman of the AIP.

Notable past party officials include:

- Bob Bird, Chairman from 2020 to 2024
- Todd Palin, ex-husband of Sarah Palin (was a member for seven years, later switched to Republican Party)
- Edgar Paul Boyko, Attorney General for the State of Alaska
- Jack Coghill, former Lieutenant Governor of Alaska
- Joe Vogler, founder of the Alaskan Independence Party
- Wally Hickel, governor 1966–1969 as a Republican and 1990–1994 as AKIP, the only successful Alaskan Independence gubernatorial candidate to date.

== See also ==
- Secession in the United States
- List of political parties in the United States
- Political party strength in Alaska
- Puerto Rican Independence Party
- Republic of Texas (group)
- Free State Project
- Hawaiian sovereignty movement
- Second Vermont Republic
- Proposals for new Canadian provinces and territories
