= Don Wright (politician) =

American politician

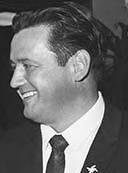
- Wright circa 1970

President of the Alaska Federation of Natives
- In office 1970–1972
- Preceded by: Emil Notti

Personal details
- Born: Donald Rose Wright; November 24, 1929 Nenana, Alaska, U.S.
- Died: July 5, 2014 (aged 84) Kenai, Alaska, U.S.
- Party: Alaskan Independence
- Other political affiliations: Democratic; Republican

Donald Rose Wright (November 24, 1929 – July 5, 2014) was an American politician from Alaska.

== Early life and education ==
Donald Rose Wright was born in Nenana, Alaska, one of seven sons of Episcopal missionaries Arthur and Myrtle Wright. His mother was white. His father was half Gwich'in and half white, with familial origins in Old Crow, Yukon, and was one of numerous Alaska Natives recruited for and mentored in the ministry by Episcopal bishop Peter Trimble Rowe. As a missionary family, they lived all over Interior Alaska, but mostly in Nenana, Minto and Fairbanks. He graduated from Fairbanks High School in 1947.

== Career ==
Wright was a former president of the Alaska Federation of Natives, serving from 1970 to 1972 during the height of activity over passage of the Alaska Native Claims Settlement Act. In addition to serving as president of AFN, he was also president of the Bartlett Democratic Club and of the Cook Inlet Native Association.

=== Political campaigns ===
Most of Wright's notoriety in Alaskan politics came as a perennial candidate for statewide office in Alaska over several decades. Wright ran for statewide office in Alaska fifteen times between 1968 and 2010, eleven of those times for governor of Alaska. Of his gubernatorial campaigns, he was most notable as the gubernatorial nominee of the Alaskan Independence Party in 1978, 2002, 2006 and 2010. The 1978 campaign was the only time in the party's early history in which party founder Joe Vogler was not the gubernatorial nominee (Vogler ran for lieutenant governor instead in this election). Wright ran his 2010 campaign without a running mate.

Besides multiple runs for office under the AIP banner, he also ran for office numerous times as both a Democrat and Republican. Wright also ran for the Republican nomination for president of the United States in 1988.

== Notable family ==
His younger brother Jules served one term in the Alaska House of Representatives as a Republican from 1967 to 1969. Another brother, Gareth, also ran for office, but was better known as the patriarch of a family of sprint dog mushers and as a frequent rival to George Attla in numerous races over the years. This rivalry was featured in the 1979 movie Spirit of the Wind. Don Wright is the great-uncle of Ramy Brooks, a dog musher who has been active in long-distance dog racing since the 1990s.

== Death ==
Wright died on July 5, 2014, in Kenai, Alaska.

Party political offices
Preceded by Joe Vogler	Alaskan Independence nominee for Governor of Alaska; 1978	Succeeded by Joe Vogler
Preceded by Sylvia Sullivan	Alaskan Independence nominee for Governor of Alaska; 2002, 2006, 2010	Succeeded by None
