= Joe Vogler =

American politician (1913–1993)

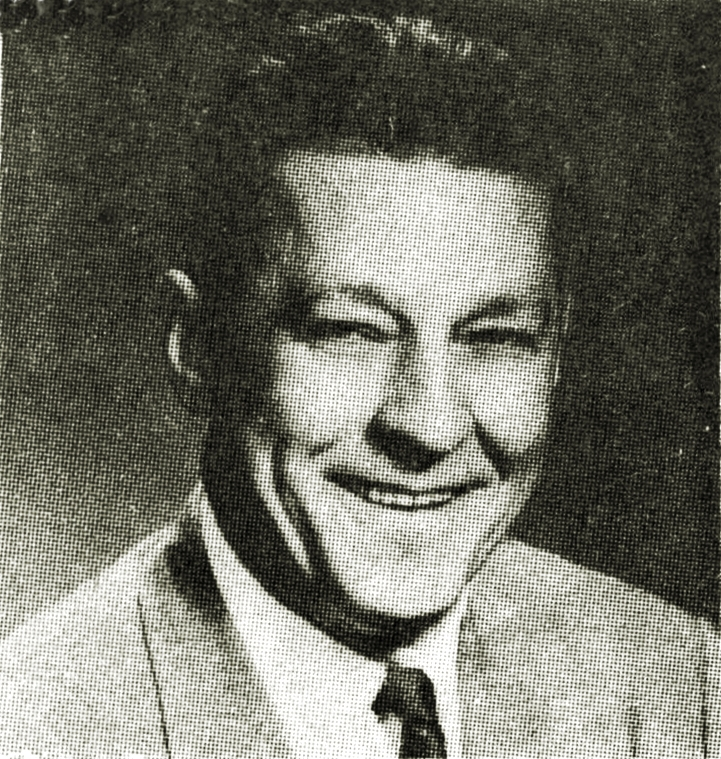
- Vogler during his first campaign for Alaska governor in 1974.
- Born: Joseph Enoch Vogler; April 24, 1913; Barnes, Kansas, U.S.
- Died: c. May 31, 1993 (aged 80); Alaska, U.S.
- Occupation: Politician
- Political party: Alaskan Independence

Joseph Enoch Vogler (April 24, 1913 – c. May 31, 1993) was an American politician and the founder of the Alaskan Independence Party. He was also chair or gubernatorial nominee during most of the party's existence.

Originally known in his adopted hometown of Fairbanks, Alaska, and later statewide, as a frequent participant in governmental and political affairs and frequent litigant in court. He was known to many non-political observers for his fashion sense, in particular his ubiquitous wearing of fedoras and bolo ties. Vogler disappeared in 1993 and was found to have been murdered after his assassin Manfried West was caught in 1994.

== Early life ==
Vogler was born April 24, 1913, on a farm outside Barnes, Kansas. He graduated from high school in Waterville, Kansas, in 1929. That year, he began studying at the University of Kansas on a scholarship. He graduated with a law degree in five years and was admitted to the Kansas State Bar.

Vogler moved to Alaska in March 1942, having run afoul of many of his contemporaries in the Lower 48 regarding his views on then-U.S. President Franklin D. Roosevelt. After spending a year in Kodiak, he moved to Fairbanks and worked as a civilian employee of the U.S. Army Corps of Engineers at Ladd Field (now Fort Wainwright) in Fairbanks, until 1951 when he began mining on Homestake Creek. He filed for 80 acres (32 ha) of homestead land off the Steese Highway and acquired 320 acres (1.3 km^{2}) near Fairbanks off Farmers Loop Road. Vogler spent fifty years as a miner and developer in Alaska.

Vogler was known around Fairbanks as a frequent writer of letters to the editor until 1973 when he launched a petition drive calling for Alaska to secede. He subsequently launched his first campaign for governor a year later. He gained his first serious notoriety in Fairbanks during the 1940s and 1950s for a feud with Paul and Flora Greimann, operators of University Bus Lines. The company was a private urban transit company, which primarily transported students between Fairbanks and the University of Alaska.

Prior to the replacement of the Cushman Street Bridge in 1959, the old bridge was too narrow to accommodate both a large vehicle such as a truck or bus, and another vehicle. Vogler, with Warren A. Taylor as his attorney, sued University Bus Lines in 1948 in what the Fairbanks Daily News-Miner at the time called the "Battle of the Bridge". Vogler sought a permanent injunction against the buses straddling the center rail of the bridge. The feud continued after the Wendell Street Bridge opened in 1953 and Greimann's buses continued using the Cushman bridge instead of the newer, wider bridge. Police were often involved in quelling these confrontations.

== Political career ==
1974 Alaska gubernatorial election

Alaskan Independence Party candidate for Governor of Alaska
- Election date November 5, 1974
- Running mate: Wayne M. Peppler
- Opponent(s): William A. Egan (D); Jay Hammond (R)
- Incumbent: William A. Egan

1978 Alaska gubernatorial election

Alaskan Independence Party candidate for Lieutenant Governor of Alaska
- Election date November 7, 1978
- Running mate: Don Wright
- Opponent(s): Katie Hurley (D); Terry Miller (R); Kay Poland (Independent)
- Incumbent: Lowell Thomas, Jr.

1982 Alaska gubernatorial election

Alaskan Independence Party candidate for Governor of Alaska
- Election date November 2, 1982
- Running mate: Roger Dee Roberts
- Opponent(s): Tom Fink (R); Dick Randolph (L); Bill Sheffield (D)
- Incumbent: Jay Hammond

1986 Alaska gubernatorial election

Alaskan Independence Party candidate for Governor of Alaska
- Election date November 4, 1986
- Running mate: Al Rowe
- Opponent(s): Steve Cowper (D); Wally Hickel (write-in); Ed Hoch (write-in); Mary O'Brannon (L); Arliss Sturgulewski (R)
- Incumbent: Bill Sheffield

Vogler arose as a figure in Alaskan politics in 1973, where he began a petition calling for secession of Alaska from the United States. Alaska magazine reported that Vogler claimed to have gathered 15,000 signatures over a period of about three weeks. Vogler was quoted as saying about the effort: "The response has been beyond my wildest expectations. I never dreamed the people would respond like this."

During the 1970s, Vogler founded the Alaskan Independence Party (AIP) and Alaskans For Independence. The latter name was originally used to label the 1973 petition drive. Vogler also claimed to have organized the meeting which led to the formation of the Alaska Libertarian Party. The AIP and AFI, as Vogler explained, were intended to function as strictly separate entities—AIP was primarily to explore whether the 1958 vote by Alaskans authorizing statehood was legal, and AFI was primarily to actively pursue secession for Alaska from the United States.

The Alaskan Independence Party quotes Vogler as stating "I'm an Alaskan, not an American. I've got no use for America or her damned institutions."

In a 1991 interview currently housed at the Oral History Program in the Rasmuson Library at the University of Alaska, Fairbanks, Vogler is recorded as saying "The fires of hell are frozen glaciers compared to my hatred for the American government. And I won't be buried under their damn flag. I'll be buried in Dawson. And when Alaska is an independent nation they can bring my bones home."

Vogler would serve as the AIP's standard-bearer for most of the party's first two decades. He ran for governor in 1974, with Wayne Peppler (born March 26, 1942), a fellow miner from Fairbanks, as his running mate. Jay Hammond, a longtime legislator from the Bristol Bay region, was elected over incumbent governor Bill Egan by 287 votes, with Vogler trailing far behind. Many commentators described Vogler as a "spoiler" in the election, arguing that the result would have been different had he not been in the race. However, this campaign opened up the doors for non-major party candidates to run for major offices in Alaska, and generally this accusation is leveled during every election cycle.

Vogler switched to run for lieutenant governor in 1978, with Don Wright running for governor. Wright was also the AIP's nominee for governor from 2002 through 2010. The 1978 campaign for governor was dominated by the extremely controversial Republican primary race between moderate Hammond and former governor Walter Hickel. Hickel lost the primary by 98 votes and would launch a write-in campaign in the general election.

Hammond was reelected governor. There was also a well-financed independent candidate in the race, Tom Kelly, who was Commissioner of Natural Resources under Hickel and his successor, Keith Miller. There was little hope for the AIP ticket to gain much attention due to these factors. The Democratic nominee, Chancy Croft, placed third in the general election due to the continued interest in Hammond vs. Hickel beyond the primary election.

Vogler also ran for governor in 1982 and 1986. Several incidents during these campaigns raised his profile as a "colorful character." In the 1982 race, Vogler was taken to task for comments made during a debate. The issue of moving Alaska's capital appeared during the election, as it has on and off since 1960. The media and political pundits took great fun over Vogler's debate remarks that Alaska should "nuke the glaciers" along the coast of the Gulf of Alaska and build a freeway to Juneau. Vogler would later contend that these comments were misinterpreted. Vogler's running mate in 1982 was Roger "Dee" Roberts (born March 27, 1937). Roberts had previously been a candidate for state Senate in 1974 under the banner of the American Independent Party. His family have continued as political activists in Fairbanks to this day.

Vogler's running mate in 1986 was Al Rowe (born May 11, 1932), a Fairbanks resident and former Alaska State Trooper. Rowe took out a series of newspaper ads, fashioning himself in the image of Sheriff Buford Pusser. These ads were a major attention getter during the race. Between Rowe's ads and the turmoil existing in the Republican Party over the nomination of Arliss Sturgulewski, the AIP ticket was able to garner 5.5 percent of the vote, gaining the AIP status in Alaska as a recognized political party for the first time.

Vogler quit running for public office after the 1986 election. However, he would play a significant role in the next gubernatorial race. In 1990, as party chair, Vogler paved the way for the vacation of the nominated party ticket of John Lindauer and Jerry Ward and their replacement with Hickel and Jack Coghill. Coghill had been nominated as the lieutenant governor candidate by the Republican Party, but was dealing with serious compatibility and philosophical issues with gubernatorial nominee Sturgulewski. The ticket of Hickel and Coghill would go on to win the election.

== Disappearance and death ==
Vogler disappeared under suspicious circumstances on May 30, 1993, just weeks before he was scheduled to give a speech to the United Nations on Alaskan independence, sponsored by the Islamic government of Iran.

Convicted thief Manfried West confessed to having murdered Vogler the following year in what he described as an illegal plastic explosive sale gone bad. West, trying to recant, later said the confession was a lie, but this was before Vogler's body had been discovered.

Vogler's remains were discovered in a gravel pit east of Fairbanks in October 1994 following an anonymous tip. He had been wrapped in a blue tarp secured with duct tape and was identified through fingerprint analysis. West was convicted of murdering Vogler and sentenced to 80 years.

In the opinion of AIP Chair Lynette Clark and other AIP leaders, however, Vogler's death reflected more than a dispute with West. Clark stated, "He was executed." She notes that Vogler was about to appear before the United Nations to address the issue of Alaskan independence, making the claim that "The United States government would have been deeply embarrassed. And we can't have that, can we?"

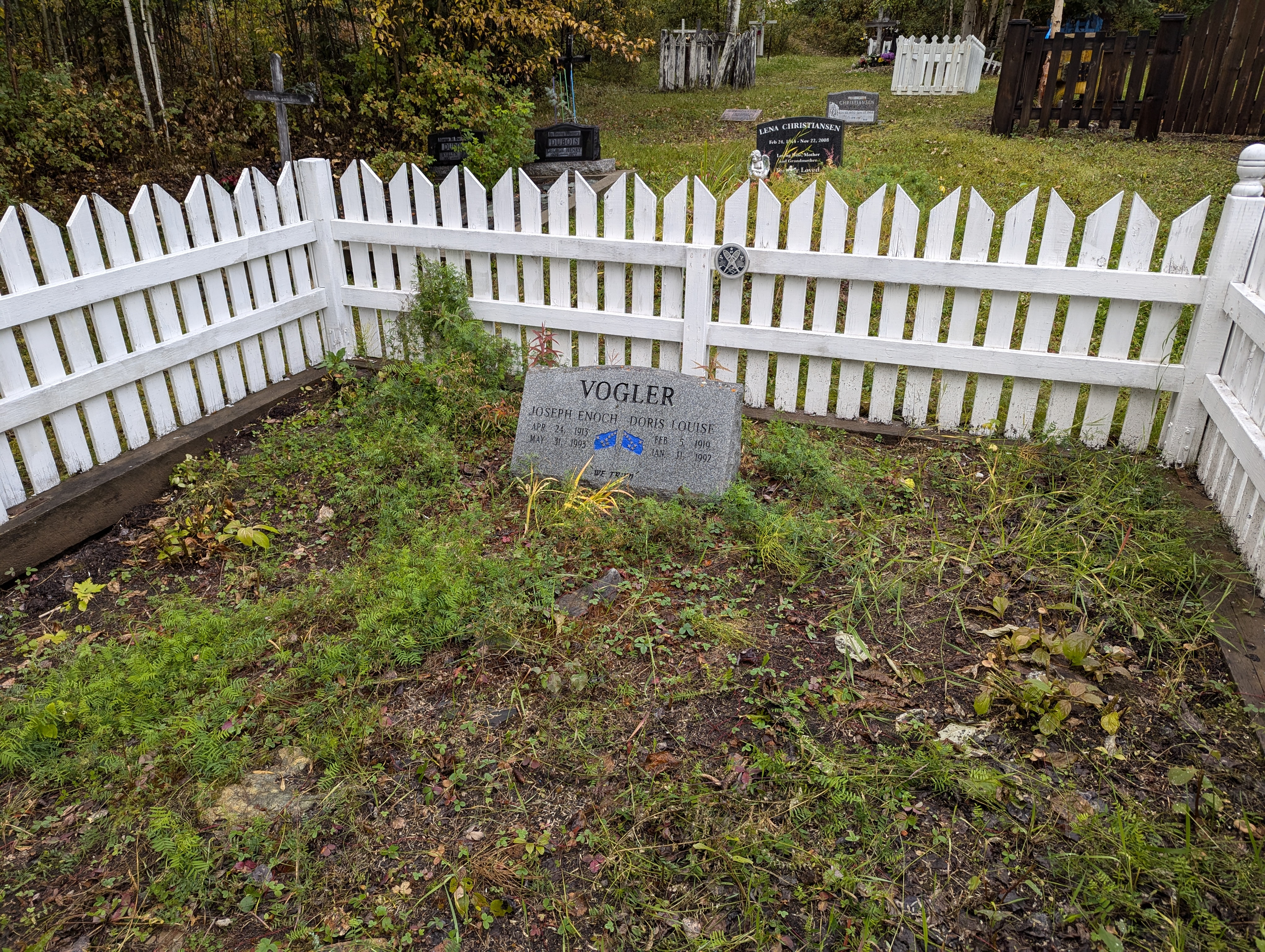
The grave of Vogler and his wife Doris Louise in Dawson City, Yukon

As he had publicly promised on numerous occasions, Vogler was buried in Dawson City, Yukon, Canada, fulfilling his wish that he not be buried under the American flag.

== Personal life ==
Vogler had a daughter (Marilyn, born at St. Joseph's Hospital on April 6, 1945) and son (Joseph Jr., born c. 1947) by his first wife, but by all accounts (including his own), he had become estranged from this part of his family. Vogler met his second wife, Doris, in 1964 and remained with her until her death from cancer in 1992. Lynn Vogler, his nephew, was named the executor of his estate in a will he wrote following the death of Doris.

Previously unknown to Joe Vogler's Fairbanks friends, Lynn Vogler arrived in Fairbanks shortly after his uncle's death and endured a contentious battle in Fairbanks during 1993 and 1994 amongst the elder Vogler's friends, supporters and hangers-on over his legacy as well as his physical property. Lynn Vogler continues to the present as the executor of the estate.

== See also ==
- Legal status of Alaska

== Sources ==
- Election Candidate Pamphlet, State of Alaska, Office of the Lieutenant Governor, 1974
- Official Election Pamphlet, State of Alaska, Office of the Lieutenant Governor, 1978, 1982 and 1986
- Official Returns By Election Precinct, State of Alaska, Office of the Lieutenant Governor, 1974, 1978 and 1982
- Official Returns, State of Alaska, Office of the Lieutenant Governor, 1986
- "Like A Tree to the Soil": A History of Farming in the Tanana Valley, 1903 to 1940. Josephine E. Papp and Josie Phillips. UAF School of Natural Resources and Agricultural Sciences, 2007.
- Henning, Robert A., ed. (June 1973). "Alaska". Edmonds, Washington: 64–65.
- Hilzoy (September 2, 2008). "Curiouser and Curiouser". CBS News. Archived from the original on September 3, 2008.

Party political offices
First	Alaskan Independence nominee for Governor of Alaska; 1974	Succeeded by Don Wright
Preceded by Wayne Peppler	Alaskan Independence nominee for Lieutenant Governor of Alaska; 1978	Succeeded by Roger Dee Roberts
Preceded by Don Wright	Alaskan Independence nominee for Governor of Alaska; 1982, 1986	Succeeded by John Howard Lindauer
