= List of governors of Alaska =

Governor of Alaska
- Alaaskam Kavanaa
- The Seal of the State of Alaska

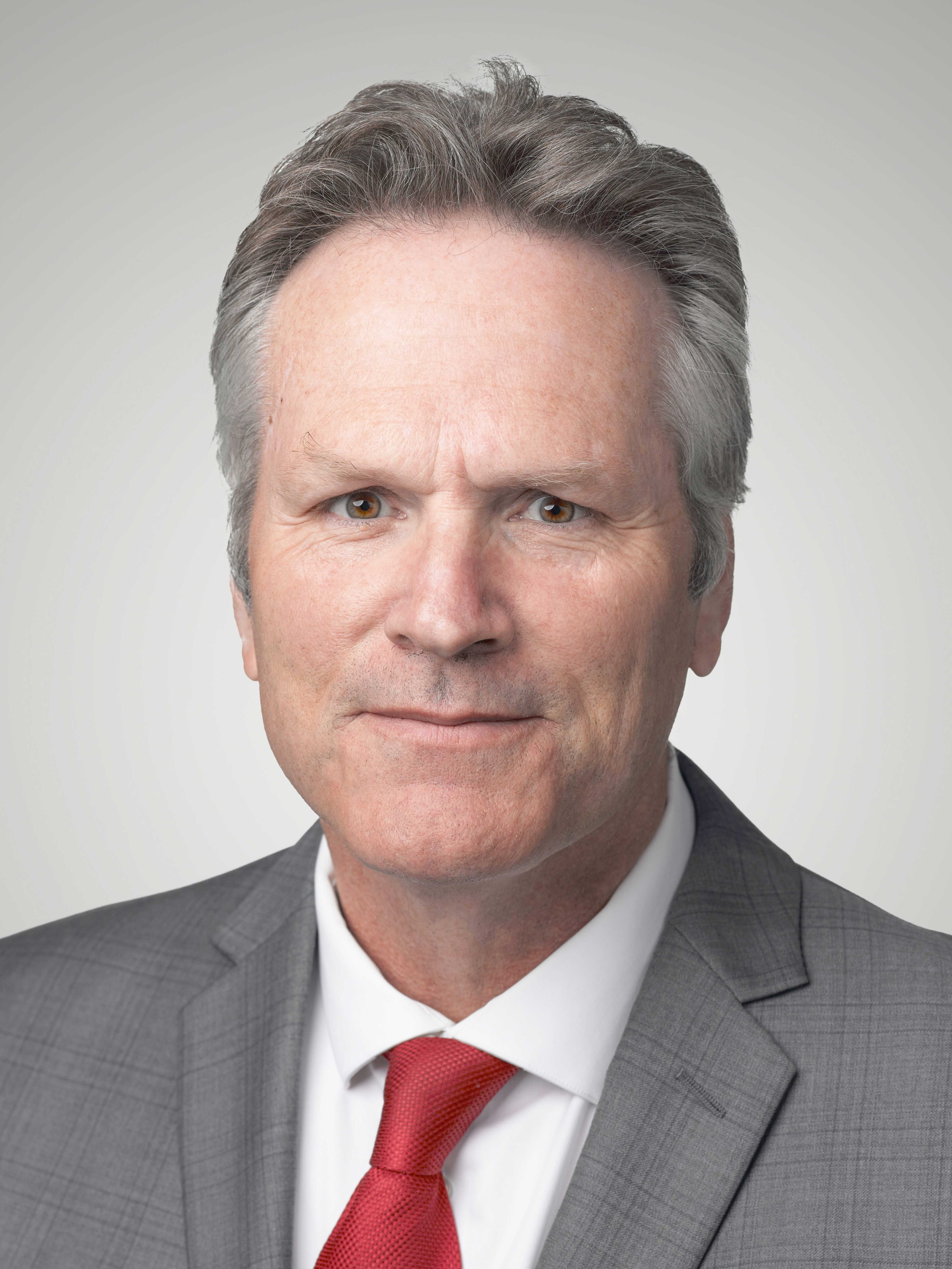
- Incumbent; Mike Dunleavy since December 3, 2018
- Government of Alaska
- Type: Chief executive; Head of government; Commander-in-chief
- Residence: Alaska Governor's Mansion
- Term length: Four years, renewable once consecutively
- Inaugural holder: William A. Egan
- Formation: January 3, 1959
- Succession: Line of succession
- Deputy: Lieutenant Governor of Alaska
- Salary: $145,000 (2022)
- Website: gov.alaska.gov

The governor of Alaska (Iñupiaq: Alaaskam kavanaa) is the head of government of Alaska. The governor is the chief executive of the state and is the holder of the highest office in the executive branch of the government as well as being the commander in chief of Alaska's state forces.

Twelve people have served as governor of the state of Alaska over 14 distinct terms, though Alaska had over 30 civilian and military governors during its long history as a United States territory. Only two governors, William A. Egan and Bill Walker, were born in Alaska. Two people, Egan and Wally Hickel, have been elected to multiple non-consecutive terms as governor. Hickel is also noted for a rare third party win in American politics, having been elected to a term in 1990 representing the Alaskan Independence Party. The longest-serving governor of the state was Egan, who was elected three times and served nearly 12 years. The longest-serving territorial governor was Ernest Gruening, who served over 13 years.

The current governor is Republican Mike Dunleavy, who took office on December 3, 2018.

== Governors before statehood ==
Alaska was purchased by the United States from the Russian Empire in 1867, with formal transfer occurring on October 18, 1867, which is now celebrated as Alaska Day. Before then, it was known as Russian America or Russian Alaska, controlled by the governors and general managers of the Russian-American Company.

The vast region was initially designated the Department of Alaska, under the jurisdiction of the Department of War until 1877, when the Army was withdrawn from Alaska. The Department of the Treasury then took control, with the Collector of Customs as the highest ranking federal official in the territory. In 1879, the Navy was given jurisdiction over the department.

Some believe the first American administrator of Alaska was Polish immigrant Włodzimierz Krzyżanowski. However, the Anchorage Daily News was unable to find any conclusive information to support this claim.

=== Governors of the District of Alaska ===
On May 17, 1884, the Department of Alaska was redesignated the District of Alaska, an incorporated but unorganized territory with a civil government. The governor was appointed by the president of the United States.

Governors of the District of Alaska
No.	Governor	Term in office (Note: The range given is from the date the governor was confirmed by the Senate, or appointed by the President during a Senate recess, to the date the governor's successor was confirmed, unless noted.)	Appointed by
1	John Henry Kinkead (1826–1904)	July 4, 1884 (Note: Kinkead was nominated on June 27, 1884, and confirmed by the Senate on July 4. It is unknown precisely when he took office; the only contemporary news found thus far reported it was on or just before September 15.) – May 8, 1885 (309 days; replaced)	Chester A. Arthur
2	Alfred P. Swineford (1836–1909)	May 8, 1885 (Note: Swineford was appointed on May 8, 1885, during a Senate recess; nominated on December 10; and confirmed by the Senate on June 7. He took office in Alaska on September 15.) – April 13, 1889 (1437 days; resigned) (Note: Swineford submitted his resignation on March 4, 1889, to take effect when his successor was appointed; while modern sources say he resigned on April 20, his successor was nominated on April 13, took the oath of office outside of the state on April 15, and took office on June 1. As no sourcing of when Swineford actually left office has been found, this article uses the date his successor was confirmed, April 13.)	Grover Cleveland
3	Lyman Enos Knapp (1837–1904)	April 13, 1889 (Note: Knapp was appointed on April 13, 1889, during a Senate recess; nominated on December 17; and confirmed by the Senate on December 21. He took the oath of office out of state on April 15, and took office on June 1.) – June 28, 1893 (1538 days; replaced) (Note: No sources specify when Knapp left office; McMullin & Walker say "August 1893", which is when his successor took office, but their presidential appointment specified, "vice Lyman E. Knapp, removed", implying he may not have remained governor until then. As his successor was appointed on June 28, that date is used here.)	Benjamin Harrison
4	James Sheakley (1829–1917)	June 28, 1893 (Note: Sheakley was appointed on June 28, 1893, during a Senate recess; nominated on August 18; and confirmed by the Senate on August 22. He took office on August 29.) – June 19, 1897 (1453 days; resigned) (Note: The nomination of Brady as Sheakley's successor was confirmed on June 19, 1897, and he arrived in the district on July 15, 1897, which is when contemporary press reported that Sheakley had resigned; however, as Brady's nomination said Sheakley had resigned, this implies a resignation post-dated to when his successor arrived. No source yet found specifies why this resignation occurred.)	Grover Cleveland
5	John Green Brady (1848–1918)	June 19, 1897 (Note: Brady was nominated on June 15, 1897, confirmed by the Senate on June 19, and took office on July 15. He was reconfirmed by the Senate on June 7, 1900, and January 15, 1905.) – March 21, 1906 (3197 days; resigned) (Note: Brady was forced to resign due to his involvement with the fraudulent Reynolds–Alaska Development Company. He submitted his resignation on February 14, 1906, to take effect upon the appointment of his successor.)	William McKinley
5	John Green Brady (1848–1918)	June 19, 1897 – March 21, 1906 (3197 days; resigned)	Theodore Roosevelt
6	Wilford Bacon Hoggatt (1865–1938)	March 21, 1906 (Note: Hoggatt was nominated on March 12, 1906, confirmed by the Senate on March 21, and took office on April 30.) – October 1, 1909 (1291 days; resigned) (Note: Hoggatt resigned to tend to business interests. He submitted his resignation on May 18, 1909, to take effect on October 1, when his successor's term was scheduled to begin.)	Theodore Roosevelt
7	Walter Eli Clark (1869–1950)	October 1, 1909 (Note: Clark was nominated on May 18, 1909, and confirmed by the Senate on May 20, for a term set to begin October 1.) – August 24, 1912 (1059 days; became territorial governor)	William Howard Taft

=== Governors of the Territory of Alaska ===
The District of Alaska was organized into Alaska Territory on August 24, 1912. Governors continued to be appointed by the president of the United States.

Governors of the Territory of Alaska
No.	Governor	Term in office	Appointed by
1	Walter Eli Clark (1869–1950)	August 24, 1912 – May 1, 1913 (251 days; resigned) (Note: Clark submitted his resignation on March 4, 1913, to take effect upon the appointment of his successor, to return to private life.)	William Howard Taft
2	John Franklin Alexander Strong (1856–1929)	May 1, 1913 (Note: Strong was nominated on April 21, 1913, confirmed by the Senate on May 1, and took office on May 21.) – April 12, 1918 (1808 days; replaced) (Note: According to Ernest Gruening, Wilson declined to reappoint Strong because he may have still been a Canadian citizen. President Wilson's nomination of Strong's successor specified, "vice John F. A. Strong, term expired and resigned;" however, Strong denied resigning.)	Woodrow Wilson
3	Thomas Riggs Jr. (1873–1945)	April 12, 1918 (Note: Riggs was nominated on March 7, 1918, confirmed by the Senate on April 12, and took office on April 26.) – June 13, 1921 (1159 days; resigned) (Note: President Wilson's nomination of Riggs' successor specified, "vice Thomas Riggs, resigned;" no other reference to Riggs' resignation has been found.)	Woodrow Wilson
4	Scott Cordelle Bone (1860–1936)	June 13, 1921 (Note: Bone was nominated on June 1, 1921, and confirmed by the Senate on June 13. He was sworn in out of state on June 15, and took office on July 13.) – February 18, 1925 (1347 days; replaced)	Warren G. Harding
5	George Alexander Parks (1883–1984)	February 18, 1925 (Note: Parks was nominated on February 16, 1925, confirmed on February 18, and took office on June 16.) – March 30, 1933 (2963 days; replaced)	Calvin Coolidge
6	John Weir Troy (1868–1942)	March 30, 1933 (Note: Troy was nominated on March 23, 1933, confirmed on March 30, and took office on April 19. He was reconfirmed by the Senate on May 20, 1937.) – December 5, 1939 (2442 days; resigned) (Note: Troy resigned due to poor health. He submitted his resignation on August 29, 1939, to take effect October 15; he was asked by President Roosevelt to remain until his successor took office.)	Franklin D. Roosevelt
7	Ernest Gruening (Note: During most of World War II, Lt. Gen. Simon Bolivar Buckner Jr., was the military commander of Alaska, and held much executive power over the territory.) (1887–1974)	December 5, 1939 (Note: Gruening was appointed on September 2, 1939, during a Senate recess; nominated on January 4, 1940, and confirmed by the Senate on February 1, 1940. He took office on December 5, 1939. He was reconfirmed by the Senate on March 22, 1944, and April 8, 1949.) – March 16, 1953 (4851 days; replaced)	Franklin D. Roosevelt
7	Ernest Gruening (1887–1974)	December 5, 1939 – March 16, 1953 (4851 days; replaced)	Harry S. Truman
8	B. Frank Heintzleman (1888–1965)	March 16, 1953 (Note: Heintzleman was nominated on March 11, 1953, confirmed by the Senate on March 16, and took office on April 10.) – January 3, 1957 (1390 days; resigned) (Note: Heintzleman resigned to return to private life; some sources say he was unhappy with the job, and did not expect to be reappointed. He submitted his resignation to President Eisenhower on December 19, 1956, and it took effect on January 3, 1957; Territorial Secretary Waino Hendrickson acted as governor until his successor arrived.)	Dwight D. Eisenhower
9	Mike Stepovich (1919–2014)	May 16, 1957 (Note: Stepovich was nominated on May 9, 1957, confirmed by the Senate on May 16, and took office on June 8.) – August 9, 1958 (451 days; resigned) (Note: Stepovich resigned to run for the United States Senate, losing that election. He submitted his resignation on August 1, 1958, to take effect August 9; Territorial Secretary Waino Hendrickson acted as governor until statehood.)	Dwight D. Eisenhower

== Governors of the State of Alaska ==
Alaska was admitted to the Union on January 3, 1959.

The state constitution provides for the election of a governor and lieutenant governor every four years on the same ticket, with their terms commencing on the first Monday in the December following the election. Governors are allowed to succeed themselves once, having to wait four years after their second term in a row before being allowed to run again. Should the office of governor become vacant, the lieutenant governor assumes the office of governor. The original constitution of 1956 created the office of secretary of state, which was functionally identical to a lieutenant governor, and was renamed to "lieutenant governor" in 1970.

Governors of the State of Alaska
No.	Governor	Term in office	Party	Election	Lt. Governor (Note: The office of lieutenant governor was named secretary of state until 1970.) (Note: Lieutenant governors represented the same party as their governor unless noted.)
1	William A. Egan (1914–1984)	January 3, 1959 – December 5, 1966 (2894 days; lost election) (Note: As Egan's first term did not begin until statehood, he had not served the "two full successive terms" that would have constitutionally prohibited him from running for a third term.)	Democratic	1958	Hugh Wade
1	William A. Egan (1914–1984)	January 3, 1959 – December 5, 1966 (2894 days; lost election)	Democratic	1962	Hugh Wade
2	Wally Hickel (1919–2010)	December 5, 1966 – January 24, 1969 (782 days; resigned) (Note: Hickel resigned, having been confirmed as United States Secretary of the Interior.)	Republican	1966	Keith Harvey Miller
3	Keith Harvey Miller (1925–2019)	January 24, 1969 – December 7, 1970 (683 days; lost election)	Republican	Succeeded from secretary of state	Robert W. Ward
1	William A. Egan (1914–1984)	December 7, 1970 – December 2, 1974 (1457 days; lost election)	Democratic	1970	H. A. Boucher
4	Jay Hammond (1922–2005)	December 2, 1974 – December 6, 1982 (2927 days; term-limited) (Note: Governors who have served two full successive terms are not eligible again until another full term has passed.)	Republican	1974	Lowell Thomas Jr.
4	Jay Hammond (1922–2005)	December 2, 1974 – December 6, 1982 (2927 days; term-limited)	Republican	1978	Terry Miller
5	Bill Sheffield (1928–2022)	December 6, 1982 – December 1, 1986 (1457 days; lost nomination)	Democratic	1982	Steve McAlpine
6	Steve Cowper (b. 1938)	December 1, 1986 – December 3, 1990 (1464 days; retired)	Democratic	1986	Steve McAlpine
2	Wally Hickel (1919–2010)	December 3, 1990 – December 5, 1994 (1464 days; retired)	Alaskan; Independence (Note: Hickel was elected as a member of the Alaskan Independence Party, and switched to the Republican party in April 1994.)	1990	Jack Coghill
7	Tony Knowles (b. 1943)	December 5, 1994 – December 2, 2002 (2920 days; term-limited)	Democratic	1994	Fran Ulmer
7	Tony Knowles (b. 1943)	December 5, 1994 – December 2, 2002 (2920 days; term-limited)	Democratic	1998	Fran Ulmer
8	Frank Murkowski (b. 1933)	December 2, 2002 – December 4, 2006 (1464 days; lost nomination)	Republican	2002	Loren Leman
9	Sarah Palin (b. 1964)	December 4, 2006 – July 26, 2009 (966 days; resigned) (Note: Palin resigned, citing the costs of ethics investigations.)	Republican	2006	Sean Parnell
10	Sean Parnell (b. 1962)	July 26, 2009 – December 1, 2014 (1955 days; lost election)	Republican	Succeeded from lieutenant governor	Vacant
10	Sean Parnell (b. 1962)	July 26, 2009 – December 1, 2014 (1955 days; lost election)	Republican	Succeeded from lieutenant governor	Craig Campbell (took office August 10, 2009) (Note: Campbell's position was termed "Temporary Substitute Lieutenant Governor until he was confirmed by the Alaska Legislature on August 10, 2009.)
10	Sean Parnell (b. 1962)	July 26, 2009 – December 1, 2014 (1955 days; lost election)	Republican	2010	Mead Treadwell
11	Bill Walker (b. 1951)	December 1, 2014 – December 3, 2018 (1464 days; withdrew) (Note: Walker withdrew from the election on October 19, 2018, after the deadline of September 4, and so remained on the ballot.)	Independent	2014	Byron Mallott (Note: Mallott was a Democrat who was elected as an independent on a "unity ticket" with Walker, but some sources continued to refer to him as a Democrat.) (resigned October 16, 2018)
11	Bill Walker (b. 1951)	December 1, 2014 – December 3, 2018 (1464 days; withdrew)	Independent	2014	Valerie Davidson (Note: Represented the Democratic Party)
12	Mike Dunleavy (b. 1961)	December 3, 2018 – Incumbent (Note: Dunleavy's second term began on December 5, 2022, and will expire on December 7, 2026; he will be term-limited.) (in office 2912 days)	Republican	2018	Kevin Meyer
12	Mike Dunleavy (b. 1961)	December 3, 2018 – Incumbent (in office 2912 days)	Republican	2022	Nancy Dahlstrom
13	Jonathan Kreiss-Tomkins (b. 1989)	Governor-elect takes office December 7, 2026	Democratic	2026	Zac Johnson (Note: Independent)

== Timeline ==
Timeline of Alaska governors

== Elections ==
Gubernatorial elections of the State of Alaska
Election date	Incumbent	Winner	Runner-up	Term start date	Term Definitions		
Election date	Incumbent	Winner	Runner-up	Term start date	Length	Limit	Beginning
November 25 1958	new office (Note: Mike Stepovich was the incumbent governor of Alaska Territory at the time of the election.)	William A. Egan; Dem., 59.6%	John Butrovich; Rep., 39.4%	January 3, 1959	1956 constitution		
November 25 1958	new office	William A. Egan; Dem., 59.6%	John Butrovich; Rep., 39.4%	January 3, 1959	Four years	Can succeed self once, then must wait a term	First Monday in December
November 6 1962	William A. Egan; Dem., running	William A. Egan; Dem., 52.3%	Mike Stepovich; Rep., 47.7%	December 3, 1962	Four years	Can succeed self once, then must wait a term	First Monday in December
November 8 1966	William A. Egan; Dem., running (Note: As Egan's first term was not a four full years, he was able to run for a third successive term.)	Wally Hickel; Rep., 50.0%	William A. Egan; Dem., 48.4%	December 5, 1966	Four years	Can succeed self once, then must wait a term	First Monday in December
November 3 1970	Keith Harvey Miller (Note: Miller succeeded Hickel upon his resignation on January 24, 1969.); Rep., running	William A. Egan; Dem., 52.4%	Keith Harvey Miller; Rep., 46.1%	December 7, 1970	Four years	Can succeed self once, then must wait a term	First Monday in December
November 5 1974	William A. Egan; Dem., running	Jay Hammond; Rep., 47.7%	William A. Egan; Dem., 47.4%	December 2, 1974	Four years	Can succeed self once, then must wait a term	First Monday in December
November 7 1978	Jay Hammond; Rep., running	Jay Hammond; Rep., 39.1%	Wally Hickel; Write-in, 26.4%	December 4, 1978	Four years	Can succeed self once, then must wait a term	First Monday in December
November 2 1982	Jay Hammond; Rep., term-limited	Bill Sheffield; Dem., 46.1%	Tom Fink; Rep., 37.1%	December 6, 1982	Four years	Can succeed self once, then must wait a term	First Monday in December
November 4 1986	Bill Sheffield; Dem., lost nomination	Steve Cowper; Dem., 47.3%	Arliss Sturgulewski; Rep., 42.6%	December 1, 1986	Four years	Can succeed self once, then must wait a term	First Monday in December
November 6 1990	Steve Cowper; Dem., retiring	Wally Hickel; Alaskan Ind., 38.9%	Tony Knowles; Dem., 30.9%	December 3, 1990	Four years	Can succeed self once, then must wait a term	First Monday in December
November 8 1994	Wally Hickel; Alaskan Ind., retiring	Tony Knowles; Dem., 41.1%	Jim Campbell; Rep., 40.8%	December 5, 1994	Four years	Can succeed self once, then must wait a term	First Monday in December
November 3 1998	Tony Knowles; Dem., running	Tony Knowles; Dem., 51.3%	Robin L. Taylor; Write-in, 18.3%	December 7, 1998	Four years	Can succeed self once, then must wait a term	First Monday in December
November 5 2002	Tony Knowles; Dem., term-limited	Frank Murkowski; Rep., 55.8%	Fran Ulmer; Dem., 40.7%	December 2, 2002	Four years	Can succeed self once, then must wait a term	First Monday in December
November 7 2006	Frank Murkowski; Rep., lost nomination	Sarah Palin; Rep., 48.3%	Tony Knowles; Dem., 41.0%	December 4, 2006	Four years	Can succeed self once, then must wait a term	First Monday in December
November 2 2010	Sean Parnell (Note: Parnell succeeded Palin upon her resignation on July 26, 2009.); Rep., running	Sean Parnell; Rep., 59.1%	Ethan Berkowitz; Dem., 37.7%	December 6, 2010	Four years	Can succeed self once, then must wait a term	First Monday in December
November 4 2014	Sean Parnell; Rep., running	Bill Walker; Ind., 48.1%	Sean Parnell; Rep., 45.9%	December 1, 2014	Four years	Can succeed self once, then must wait a term	First Monday in December
November 6 2018	Bill Walker; Ind., withdrawn	Mike Dunleavy; Rep., 51.4%	Mark Begich; Dem., 44.4%	December 3, 2018	Four years	Can succeed self once, then must wait a term	First Monday in December
November 8 2022	Mike Dunleavy; Rep., running	Mike Dunleavy; Rep., 50.3%	Les Gara; Dem., 24.2%	December 5, 2022	Four years	Can succeed self once, then must wait a term	First Monday in December
November 3 2026	Mike Dunleavy; Rep., term-limited	Jonathan Kreiss-Tomkins		December 7, 2026	Four years	Can succeed self once, then must wait a term	First Monday in December

== Electoral history ==
Year	Democratic nominee			Republican nominee			Independent candidate			Alaskan Independence nominee			Libertarian nominee			Green nominee			Other candidate		
Year	Candidate	#	%	Candidate	#	%	Candidate	#	%	Candidate	#	%	Candidate	#	%	Candidate	#	%	Candidate	#	%
1958	William A. Egan	29,189	59.61%	John Butrovich	19,299	39.41%	Mike Dollinter	480	0.98%	–			–			–			–		
1962	William A. Egan	29,627	52.27%	Mike Stepovich	27,054	47.73%	–			–			–			–			–		
1966	William A. Egan	32,065	48.37%	Wally Hickel	33,145	49.99%	John Grasse	1,084	1.64%	–			–			–			–		
1970	William A. Egan	42,309	52.38%	Keith Harvey Miller	37,264	46.13%	–			–			–			–			Ralph Anderson (American Independent)	1,206	1.49%
1974	William A. Egan	45,553	47.37%	Jay Hammond	45,840	47.67%	–			Joseph E. Vogler	4,770	4.96%	–			–			–		
1978	Chancy Croft	25,656	20.22%	Jay Hammond	49,580	39.07%	Tom Kelly	15,656	12.34%	Don Wright	2,463	1.94%	–			–			Wally Hickel (Republican/Write-in)	33,555	26.44%
1982	Bill Sheffield	89,918	46.12%	Tom Fink	72,291	37.09%	–			Joseph E. Vogler	3,235	1.66%	Dick Randolph	29,067	14.91%	–			–		
1986	Steve Cowper	84,943	47.31%	Arliss Sturgulewski	76,515	42.61%	–			Joseph E. Vogler	10,013	5.58%	Mary Jane O'Brannon	1,050	0.58%	–			–		
1990	Tony Knowles	60,201	30.91%	Arliss Sturgulewski	50,991	26.18%	–			Wally Hickel	75,721	38.88%	–			Jim Sykes	6,563	3.37%	Michael O'Callaghan (The Political Party)	942	0.48%
1994	Tony Knowles	87,693	41.08%	Jim Campbell	87,157	40.84%	–			Jack Coghill	27,838	13.04%	–			Jim Sykes	8,727	4.09%	Ralph Winterrowd (Patriot)	1,743	0.82%
1998	Tony Knowles	112,879	51.27%	John Howard; Lindauer	39,331	17.86%	Robin L. Taylor (Republican/Write-in)	40,209	18.26%	Sylvia Sullivan	4,238	1.92%	–			Desa Jacobsson	6,618	3.01%	Ray Metcalfe (Republican Moderate)	13,540	6.15%
2002	Fran Ulmer	94,216	40.70%	Frank Murkowski	129,279	55.85%	–			Don Wright	2,185	0.94%	Billy Toien	1,109	0.48%	Diane E. Benson	2,926	1.26%	Raymond VinZant (Republican Moderate)	1,506	0.65%
2006	Tony Knowles	97,238	40.97%	Sarah Palin	114,697	48.33%	Andrew Halcro	22,443	9.46%	Don Wright	1,285	0.54%	Billy Toien	682	0.29%	David Massie	593	0.25%	–		
2010	Ethan Berkowitz	96,519	37.67%	Sean Parnell	151,318	59.06%	–			Don Wright	4,775	1.86%	Billy Toien	2,682	1.05%	–			–		
2014	–			Sean Parnell	128,435	45.88%	Bill Walker	134,658	48.10%	–			Carolyn Clift	8,985	3.21%	–			J.R. Myers (Constitution)	6,987	2.50%
2018	Mark Begich	125,739	44.41%	Mike Dunleavy	145,631	51.44%	Bill Walker	5,757	2.03%	–			Billy Toien	5,402	1.91%	–			–		
2022	Les Gara	63,851	24.21%	Mike Dunleavy	132,632	50.29%	Bill Walker	54,688	20.73%	–			–			–			Charlie Pierce (Republican)	11,817	4.48%

== See also ==
- Gubernatorial lines of succession in the United States § Alaska
- First ladies and gentlemen of Alaska
- Lieutenant Governor of Alaska
- Chief Managers of the Russian-American Company
- List of Alaska State Legislatures

== Sources ==
- "Former Alaska Governors". National Governors Association.
- "Governors of Alaska". Alaska State Library.
- "Alaska Constitution". State Democracy Research Initiative. University of Wisconsin Law School.
- Glashan, Roy R. (1979). American Governors and Gubernatorial Elections, 1775-1978. Meckler Books. ISBN 0-7201-1511-6 – via Internet Archive.
- Kallenbach, Joseph E.; Kallenbach, Jessamine S. (1977). American State Governors, 1776-1976. Oceana Publications. ISBN 978-0-379-00665-0 – via Internet Archive.
- McMullin, Thomas A.; Walker, David (1984). Biographical Directory of American Territorial Governors. Meckler Publishing. ISBN 0-930466-11-X – via Internet Archive.
- Mullaney, Marie Marmo (1994). Biographical Directory of the Governors of the United States, 1988–1994. Greenwood Publishing Group. ISBN 0-313-28312-5 – via Internet Archive.
- Sobel, Robert; Raimo, John (1978). Biographical Directory of the Governors of the United States, 1789-1978. Vol. 1. Meckler Books. ISBN 0-930466-01-2 – via Internet Archive.
- Thorpe, Francis Newton, ed. (1909). The Federal and State Constitutions, Colonial Charters, and Other Organic Laws of the States, Territories, and Colonies Now or Heretofore Forming the United States of America. Vol. 1. United States Government Publishing Office – via Internet Archive.
