= 1982 Alaska gubernatorial election =

- November 2, 1982
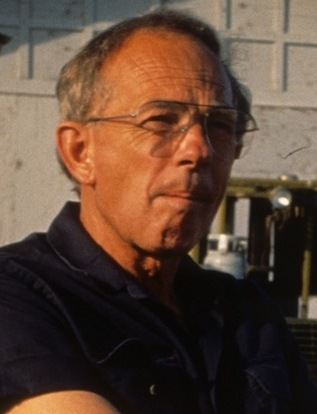

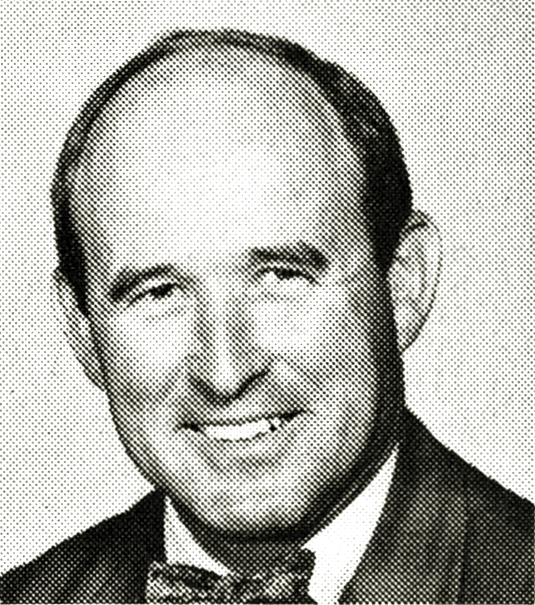

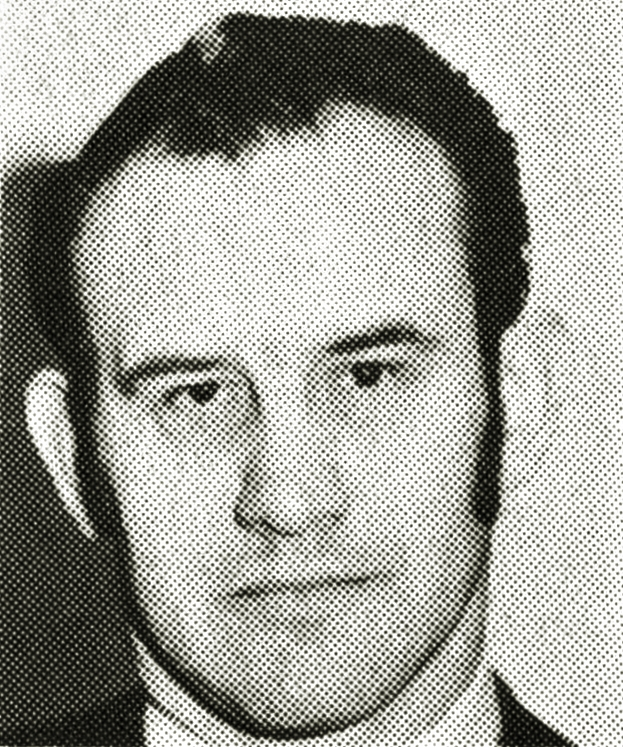
Nominee	Bill Sheffield	Tom Fink	Dick Randolph
Party	Democratic	Republican	Libertarian
Running mate	Steve McAlpine	Mike Colletta	Donnis Thompson
Popular vote	89,918	72,291	29,067
Percentage	46.12%	37.09%	14.91%
- Results by state house district Sheffield: 30–40% 40–50% 50–60% 60–70% 70–80% 80–90% Fink: 30–40% 40–50% 50–60% 60–70%
Governor before election
Jay Hammond
Republican
Elected Governor
Bill Sheffield
Democratic

The 1982 Alaska gubernatorial election took place on November 2, 1982, for the post of Governor of Alaska. To replace outgoing Republican governor Jay Hammond, Democratic nominee Bill Sheffield defeated three opponents: Republican nominee Tom Fink, Libertarian nominee Dick Randolph and Alaskan Independence Party nominee Joe Vogler. Hammond had endorsed his lieutenant governor, Terry Miller, who lost the Republican nomination to Fink in the primary election, as did Don Wright. Sheffield defeated Steve Cowper and former Lieutenant Governor H. A. Boucher for the Democratic nomination.

As of 2023, this is the earliest gubernatorial election in Alaska in which at least one candidate, Dick Randolph, is still living. Randolph was one of the few third-party candidates in Alaska's history to have served in office, serving two terms as a Libertarian in the state house before running for governor. Randolph, as a member of a political party not recognized by the state, gained access to the ballot via a nominating petition. He garnered nearly fifteen percent of the vote, to date the highest percentage received by any Libertarian Party gubernatorial candidate. His running mate, Donnis Thompson, who was married to the mayor of the Kenai Peninsula Borough, was the only woman on a statewide ballot in this year's elections, as well as one of the first in Alaskan history.

== Results ==
1982 Alaska gubernatorial election
Party	Candidate	Votes	%	±%
Democratic	Bill Sheffield	89,918	46.12%	+15.90%
Republican	Tom Fink	72,291	37.09%	−1.98%
Libertarian	Dick Randolph	29,067	14.91%	
Independence	Joe Vogler	3,235	1.66%	−0.28%
Write-in votes		374	0.19%	−26.25%
Majority		17,627	9.04%	
Turnout		194,885		
Democratic gain from Republican		Swing		
