= Governor Knowles =

Governor Knowles may refer to:

- Tony Knowles (politician) (born 1943), 9th Governor of Alaska
- Warren P. Knowles (1908–1993), 37th Governor of Wisconsin
