= 1990 Alaska gubernatorial election =

- November 6, 1990
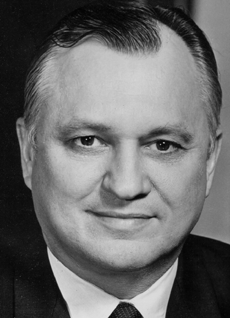

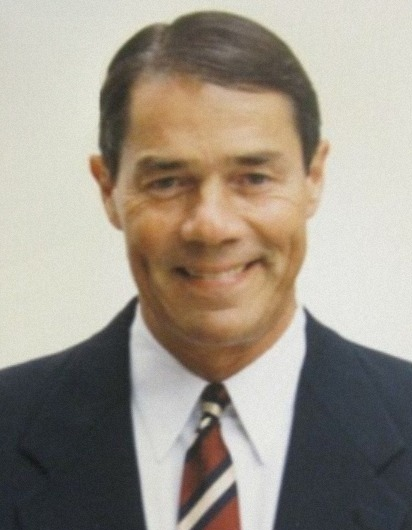

Nominee	Wally Hickel	Tony Knowles	Arliss Sturgulewski
Party	Independence	Democratic	Republican
Running mate	Jack Coghill	Willie Hensley	Jim Campbell
Popular vote	75,721	60,201	50,991
Percentage	38.88%	30.91%	26.18%
- Hickel: 30–40% 40–50% 50–60% 60–70% Knowles: 30–40% 40–50% 50–60% 60–70% 70–80% 80–90% Sturgulewski: 30–40% 40–50% 50–60% 60–70%
Governor before election
Steve Cowper
Democratic
Elected Governor
Wally Hickel
Independence

The 1990 Alaska gubernatorial election took place on November 6, 1990, for the open seat of Governor of Alaska. In 1989, incumbent governor Steve Cowper, a Democrat, had announced that he would not seek re-election for a second term.

In a rare third-party win in American politics, former Republican governor Wally Hickel, running on the ticket of the Alaskan Independence Party, defeated Democratic candidate Tony Knowles and Republican candidate Arliss Sturgulewski.

== Candidates ==
=== Democratic Party ===
The major Democratic candidates were Tony Knowles, former mayor of Anchorage (from 1981 to 1987) and future governor (from 1994 to 2002), and incumbent lieutenant governor Stephen McAlpine, who had served since 1982. Knowles defeated McAlpine in the Democratic primary.

1990 Alaska gubernatorial election (Democratic primary)
Party	Candidate	Votes	%
Democratic	Tony Knowles	36,019	56.05
Democratic	Stephen McAlpine	27,656	43.07
Democratic	Ryal White	586	0.91
Majority		8,363	12.98%
Total votes		64,261	100.00

=== Republican Party ===
In the Republican primary, state senator Arliss Sturgulewski, who was also the Republican nominee in 1986, defeated Jim Campbell, Rick Halford and Don Wright.

1990 Alaska gubernatorial election (Republican primary)
Party	Candidate	Votes	%
Republican	Arliss Sturgulewski	26,906	36.44
Republican	Jim Campbell	23,442	31.75
Republican	Rick Halford	22,466	30.43
Republican	Don Wright	1,025	1.39
Majority		3,464	4.69%
Total votes		73,839	100.00

=== Alaskan Independence Party ===
The initial Alaskan Independence Party candidate was John Lindauer, who won the primary. However, many conservative Republicans, dissatisfied with Sturgulewski's positions on social issues such as abortion, persuaded former Republican Governor Wally Hickel to run on the Alaskan Independence ticket. The party pushed Lindauer aside to make way for Hickel and lieutenant gubernatorial candidate Jack Coghill.

=== Others ===
Environmentalist and homeless rights activist Michael O'Callaghan ran as the candidate of The Political Party.

== Results ==
Former governor Wally Hickel defeated Knowles, Sturgulewski, and other minor candidates to return to the governor's office.

1990 Alaska gubernatorial election
Party	Candidate	Votes	%	±%
Independence	Wally Hickel	75,721	38.88	+33.3
Democratic	Tony Knowles	60,201	30.91	−16.4
Republican	Arliss Sturgulewski	50,991	26.18	−16.4
Green	Jim Sykes	6,563	3.37	N/A
The Political Party	Michael O'Callaghan	942	0.48	N/A
Write-in votes		332	0.17	−3.8
Majority		15,520	7.97	+3.3
Turnout		194,750		
Independence gain from Democratic		Swing	-49.70	
