= 1986 Alaska gubernatorial election =

- November 6, 1986
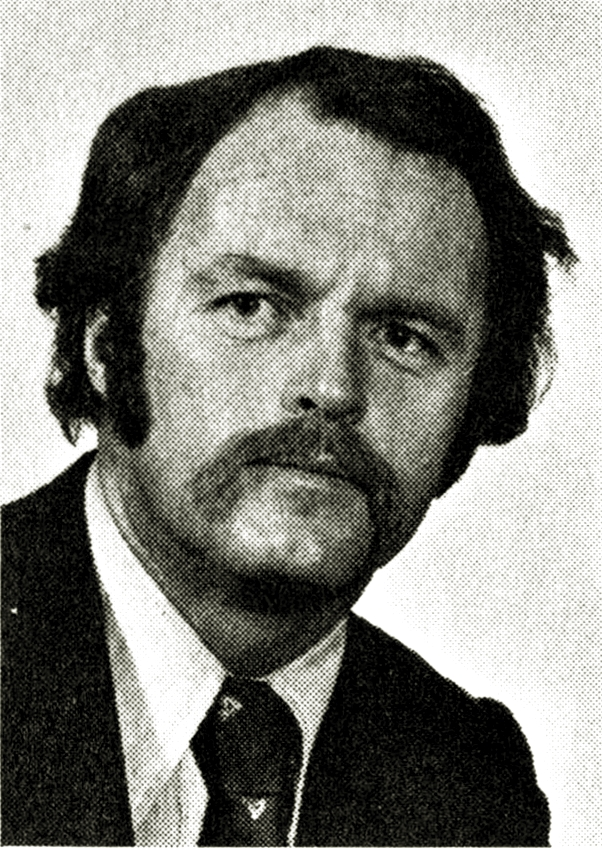

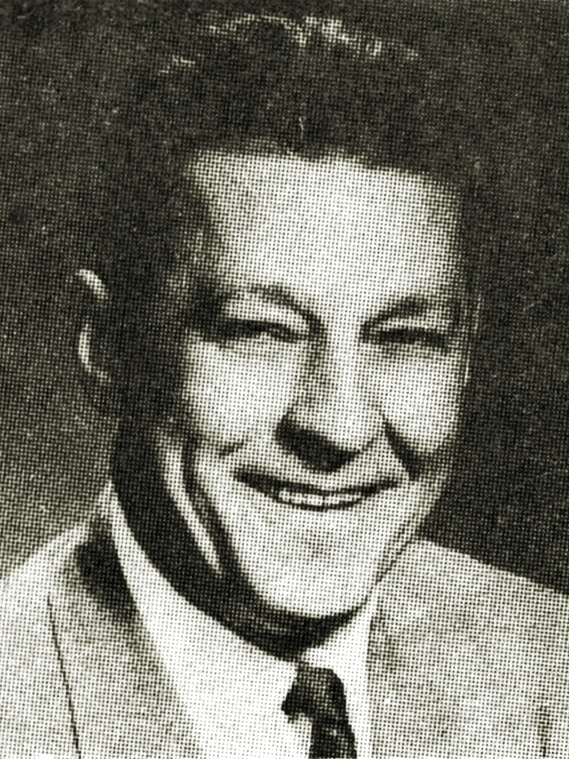
Nominee	Steve Cowper	Arliss Sturgulewski	Joe Vogler
Party	Democratic	Republican	Independence
Running mate	Steve McAlpine	Terry Miller	Al Rowe
Popular vote	84,943	76,515	10,013
Percentage	47.31%	42.61%	5.58%
- Results by state house district Cowper: 40–50% 50–60% 60–70% 70–80% Sturgulewski: 40–50% 50–60%
Governor before election
Bill Sheffield
Democratic
Elected Governor
Steve Cowper
Democratic

The 1986 Alaska gubernatorial election took place on November 4, 1986, for the post of Governor of Alaska. Incumbent Governor Bill Sheffield, a Democrat who was seeking re-election, was defeated by Steve Cowper in the Democratic primary election on August 26, 1986.

In the general election, Democratic state Representative Steve Cowper defeated Republican candidate Arliss Sturgulewski and Alaska Independence candidate Joe Vogler. Sturgulewski had defeated former governor Wally Hickel, former Libertarian nominee Dick Randolph, former State House Speaker Joe L. Hayes, and former Alaskan Independence nominee Don Wright for the Republican nomination.

== Results ==
1986 Alaska gubernatorial election
Party	Candidate	Votes	%	±%
Democratic	Steve Cowper	84,943	47.31%	+1.19%
Republican	Arliss Sturgulewski	76,515	42.61%	+5.52%
Independence	Joe Vogler	10,013	5.58%	+3.92%
Libertarian	Mary Jane O'Brannon	1,050	0.58%	−14.33%
Write-in votes		7,034	3.92%	+3.73%
Majority		8,428	4.70%	
Turnout		179,555		
Democratic hold		Swing		
