= Tony Knowles (politician) =

Governor of Alaska from 1994 to 2002

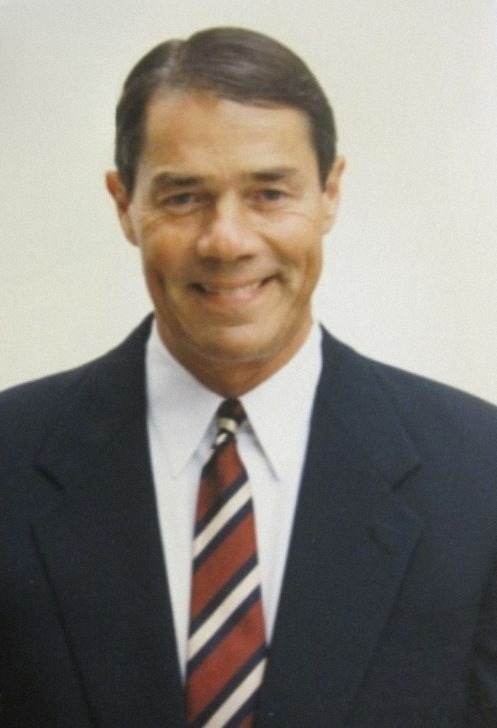

7th Governor of Alaska
- In office December 5, 1994 – December 2, 2002
- Lieutenant: Fran Ulmer
- Preceded by: Wally Hickel
- Succeeded by: Frank Murkowski

2nd Mayor of Anchorage
- In office January 1, 1982 – December 31, 1987
- Preceded by: George M. Sullivan
- Succeeded by: Tom Fink

Member of the Anchorage Assembly from Seat A
- In office September 9, 1975 – October 2, 1979
- Preceded by: Constituency established
- Succeeded by: Jane Angvik

Personal details
- Born: Anthony Carroll Knowles; January 1, 1943 (age 83) Tulsa, Oklahoma, U.S.
- Party: Democratic
- Spouse: Susan Morris (m. 1968)
- Children: 3
- Education: Yale University (BA)
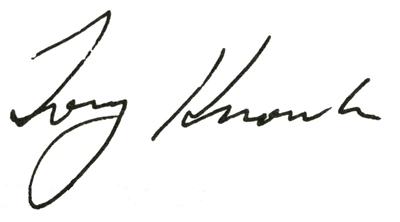
- Signature

Military service
- Branch/service: United States Army
- Years of service: 1962–1966
- Unit: 82nd Airborne Division
- Battles/wars: Vietnam War

Anthony Carroll Knowles (born January 1, 1943) is an American politician and businessman who served as the seventh governor of Alaska from 1994 to 2002. Term limited from seeking a third consecutive term as governor in 2002, he ran unsuccessfully for the U.S. Senate in 2004 and again for governor in 2006. In September 2008, Knowles became president of the National Energy Policy Institute, a non-profit energy policy organization funded by billionaire George Kaiser's family foundation, and located at the University of Tulsa. Knowles was the last Democrat elected governor of Alaska until Jonathan Kreiss-Tomkins in 2026.

Knowles was discussed as a potential secretary of the interior or secretary of energy in an Obama cabinet, but in December 2008, Knowles was passed over in favor of Steven Chu as energy secretary. He was also passed over in favor of Ken Salazar as interior secretary. On April 28, 2010, Knowles was appointed to the National Park System Advisory Board by Secretary of the Interior Ken Salazar.

== Early life ==
Knowles was born in Tulsa, Oklahoma. He volunteered for the United States Army in 1962, joining the 82nd Airborne Division, and later served in Vung Tau, Vietnam. Knowles achieved passage of legislation to create guaranteed veterans housing in the state's Pioneer's Homes, and honored their service through official days of recognition and the naming of Mount POW/MIA.

He earned a degree in economics from Yale University in 1968 where he was a Delta Kappa Epsilon fraternity (Phi chapter) brother of George W. Bush. After graduation, he moved to Alaska and worked on oil drilling rigs on the North Slope and in Cook Inlet. In 1969, Knowles started his first of four restaurants including the Downtown Deli & Café in Anchorage.

A fly fisherman, cross-country skier, and (retired) marathon runner, Knowles and his wife, former First Lady of Alaska Susan Knowles, live in Anchorage, Alaska. They have three children.

== Political career ==
After three terms in the Anchorage Assembly, he served two terms as mayor of Anchorage from 1982 to 1987. Knowles first ran for governor in 1990. He won the Democratic nomination, but was defeated by the AKIP nominee, former Governor Walter Hickel. In 1994, he defeated former lieutenant governor Stephen McAlpine in the Democratic primary and was elected governor in the general election. Knowles's election was surprisingly close, but he also benefitted from the split conservative vote due to a strong third-party gubernatorial bid by the sitting lieutenant governor. In the election, Knowles received 41.1%, Republican candidate Jim Campbell 40.8% and lieutenant governor Jack Coghill of the Alaskan Independence Party 13%.

Knowles won the 1998 election in a landslide, defeating Republican John Lindauer 51%-18%. Knowles's margin of victory in this race was due largely to a collapsed campaign from Republican John Lindauer, controversy surrounding Lindauer and his misrepresentation of facts on campaign finance documents, and questions about Lindauer's state residency. Republican Robin L. Taylor, who was defeated in the primary by Lindauer, garnered 20% of the vote after announcing his write-in campaign only one week prior to the election. Knowles did not run for reelection in 2002 due to a consecutive two-term limit. Alaska law allows for more terms, but requires a break between two consecutive terms and a third.

During the September 11 attacks, Korean Air Flight 85 from Seoul was feared to have been hijacked. Worried that a possible hijacked plane might strike a target in Alaska, Governor Tony Knowles ordered the evacuation of large hotels and government buildings in Anchorage.

Knowles was chair of the Western Governors' Association in 1997, two-term chair of the Interstate Oil & Gas Compact Commission, and a member of the Pew Oceans Commission (POC).

During his term, Knowles established Denali Kid Care, which provides basic health care for 25,000 children and 5,000 pregnant women. The National Child Welfare League named Knowles as their Child Advocate of the Year in 1998.

A strong supporter of the Alaska National Guard, Knowles was recipient of the Guard's Pro Patria award and the 2001 Charles Dick Silver Medal of Merit.

Governor Knowles forged the "Millennium Agreement", a government-to-government agreement with tribes to foster rural delivery of services and economic development. He earned special recognition by the National Congress of American Indians in 2001 and, with Marshall Lind, the 2002 Alaska Federation of Natives Denali Award, the highest award given to a non-native.

Knowles pushed Canadian officials to adopt his "safe passage" principle to protect Pacific salmon and their freshwater habitat, leading to the successful negotiation of the first coast wide salmon treaty in decades.

During his final term as governor, Republicans in the Alaska Legislature attacked him as a weak leader who avoided taking a position on several issues, as exemplified by their "Where's Tony?" campaign.

In 2004, he ran for the United States Senate, as the Democratic challenger to Republican incumbent Lisa Murkowski, who had been appointed to her seat by her father, former Senator then Governor Frank Murkowski. Knowles was at first thought likely to win by many, but he was narrowly defeated in the election.

Knowles is an outspoken opponent of capital punishment. Knowles is pro-choice, and opposes restrictions on abortion at any stage of pregnancy. He vetoed several bills passed by the state legislature regarding abortion including a ban on intact dilation and extraction abortions.

On May 29, 2006, he announced his bid to return to the governor's office in 2006. On August 22, 2006, Knowles defeated Eric Croft in the Democratic primary to become the Democratic nominee for Governor of Alaska in the general election.

On November 7, 2006, Knowles lost the Governorship in the general election to Republican Sarah Palin. Although many had predicted a close race, including pollsters for both parties, Knowles lost by 7 points, polling lower than in his 2004 bid for the U.S. Senate. Palin received 48%.

== Obama administration ==
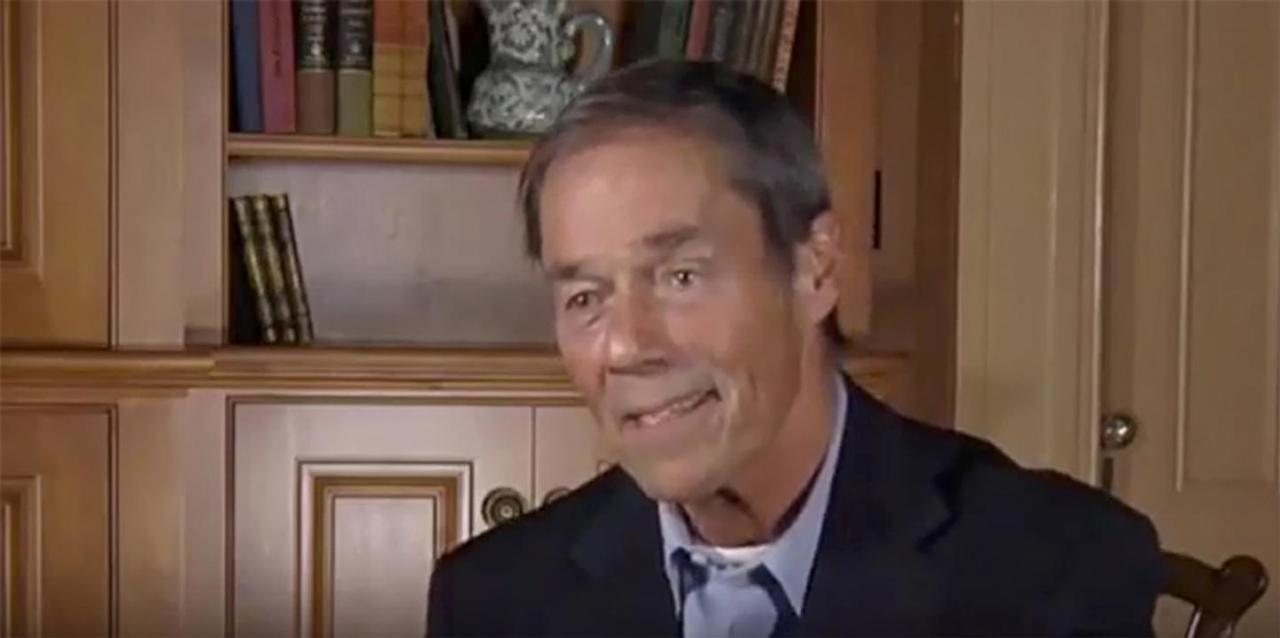
Tony Knowles being interviewed for a video in his capacity as a member of the National Park Service Advisory Board.

In September 2008, Knowles became president of the National Energy Policy Institute, a non-profit energy policy organization funded by billionaire George Kaiser's family foundation, and located at the University of Tulsa.

Due to his early support for Barack Obama, his status as a former governor of a western state, and his long-term involvement in oil and energy concerns, Knowles was discussed as a potential Secretary of the Interior or Secretary of Energy in an Obama cabinet. In December 2008 Knowles was passed over in favor of Steven Chu as Energy secretary, and passed over in favor of Ken Salazar as Interior secretary.

=== National Park System Advisory Board ===
On April 28, 2010, Knowles was appointed to the National Park System Advisory Board by Secretary of the Interior Ken Salazar.

After a change in administration in 2017, he opposed many of new Interior Secretary Ryan Zinke's policies, later claiming in his resignation letter that Zinke had no interest in the "mitigation of climate change; engaging young generations; evolving a more diverse culture of park visitors, advocates and employees; bringing our schools to our parks and our parks to our schools; stressing park urbanization; (and) protecting the natural diversity of wildlife." Knowles led a mass resignation in January 2018, citing differences with the Interior Department, especially Zinke.

== Electoral history ==
1981 Anchorage mayoral election (first round)
Party	Candidate	Votes	%
Nonpartisan	Tony Knowles	20,090	39.58
Nonpartisan	Joe L. Hayes	20,059	39.51
Nonpartisan	Dave Walsh	10,090	19.88
Nonpartisan	Matt Hammer	419	0.83
Nonpartisan	Drew M. Angel	144	0.28
Total votes		50,764	

1981 Anchorage mayoral election (runoff)
Party	Candidate	Votes	%
Nonpartisan	Tony Knowles	24,539	53.34
Nonpartisan	Joe L. Hayes	21,463	46.66
Total votes		46,002	

1984 Anchorage mayoral election
Party	Candidate	Votes	%
Nonpartisan	Tony Knowles (incumbent)	32,624	49.4
Nonpartisan	Tom Fink	32,437	49.1
Nonpartisan	Craig Campbell	199	0.0
Nonpartisan	Pat Sullivan	148	0.0
Nonpartisan	Homer C. Miracle	144	0.0
Nonpartisan	Aaron Belzer	121	0.0
Nonpartisan	Andrew Rich	67	0.0
Write-in	Write-ins	175	0.0
Total votes		65,915	

1990 Alaska gubernatorial election
Party	Candidate	Votes	%	±%
Independence	Walter Hickel	75,721	38.88	
Democratic	Tony Knowles	60,201	30.91	
Republican	Arliss Sturgulewski	50,991	26.18	
Green	Jim Sykes	6,563	3.37	

1994 Alaska gubernatorial election
Party	Candidate	Votes	%	±%
Democratic	Tony Knowles	87,693	41.09	
Republican	Jim Campbell	87,157	40.84	
Independence	Jack Coghill	27,838	13.04	
Green	Jim Sykes	8,727	4.09	

1998 Alaska gubernatorial election
Party	Candidate	Votes	%	±%
Democratic	Tony Knowles (incumbent)	112,879	51.27	
Republican	Robin Taylor (write-in)	40,209	18.26	
Republican	John Lindauer	39,331	17.86	
Republican Moderate	Ray Metcalfe	13,540	6.15	
Green	Erica Jacobsson	6,618	3.01	

2004 United States Senate election in Alaska
Party	Candidate	Votes	%	±%
Republican	Lisa Murkowski	149,773	48.6%	
Democratic	Tony Knowles	140,424	45.6%	
Independent	Marc Millican	8,885	2.9%	
Independence	Jerry Sanders	3,785	1.2%	
Green	Jim Sykes	3,053	1.0%	
Libertarian	Scott Kohlhaas	1,240	0.4%	
Independent	Ted Gianoutsos	726	0.2%	
Independent	Write Ins	423	0.1%	

2006 Alaska gubernatorial election
Party	Candidate	Votes	%	±%
Republican	Sarah Palin	114,697	48.33	−7.6
Democratic	Tony Knowles	97,238	40.97	+0.3
Independent	Andrew Halcro	22,443	9.46	n/a
Independence	Don Wright	1,285	0.54	−0.4
Libertarian	Billy Toien	682	0.29	−0.2
Green	David Massie	593	0.25	−1.0
Write-in candidate	Write-in votes	384	0.16	+0.1
Plurality		17,459	7.36	
Turnout		238,307	51.1	
Republican hold		Swing	-7.6	

Political offices
Preceded by George M. Sullivan	Mayor of Anchorage; 1981–1987	Succeeded by Tom Fink
Preceded by Wally Hickel	Governor of Alaska; 1994–2002	Succeeded by Frank Murkowski
Party political offices
Preceded by Steve Cowper	Democratic nominee for Governor of Alaska; 1990, 1994, 1998	Succeeded by Fran Ulmer
Preceded by Joe Sonneman	Democratic nominee for U.S. Senator from Alaska (Class 3); 2004	Succeeded by Scott McAdams
Preceded by Fran Ulmer	Democratic nominee for Governor of Alaska; 2006	Succeeded by Ethan Berkowitz
U.S. order of precedence (ceremonial)
Preceded by Steve Cowper as Former Governor	Order of precedence of the United States	Succeeded by Sarah Palin as Former Governor
