= 1984 Anchorage mayoral election =

- October 2, 1984
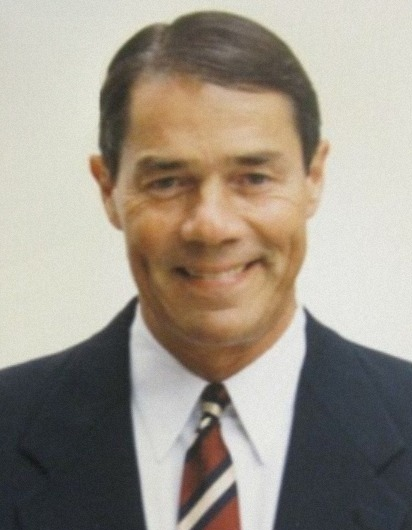

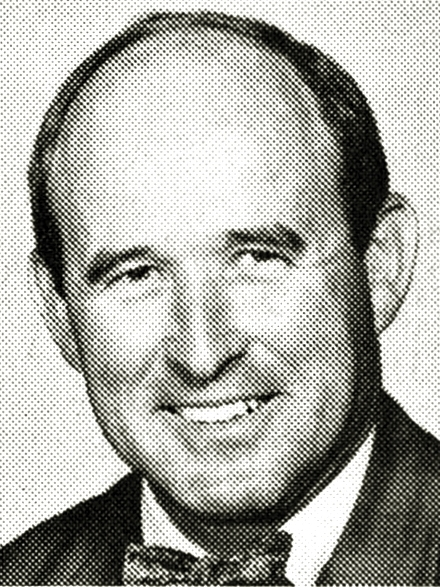
Candidate	Tony Knowles	Tom Fink
Popular vote	32,624	32,437
Percentage	49.4%	49.1%
Mayor before election
Tony Knowles
Democratic
Elected mayor
Tony Knowles
Democratic

The 1984 Anchorage mayoral election was held on October 2, 1984, to elect the mayor of Anchorage, Alaska. It saw reelection of Tony Knowles.

Since at least one candidate (in this instance, two candidates) had received 40% of the vote (which at least one candidate was required to obtain to avoid a runoff), no runoff was needed.

== Results ==
Results
Party	Candidate	Votes	%
Nonpartisan	Tony Knowles (incumbent)	32,624	49.4
Nonpartisan	Tom Fink	32,437	49.1
Nonpartisan	Craig Campbell	199	0.0
Nonpartisan	Pat Sullivan	148	0.0
Nonpartisan	Homer C. Miracle	144	0.0
Nonpartisan	Aaron Belzer	121	0.0
Nonpartisan	Andrew Rich	67	0.0
Write-in	Write-ins	175	0.0
Total votes		65,915	
