= Steve Cowper =

Governor of Alaska from 1986 to 1990

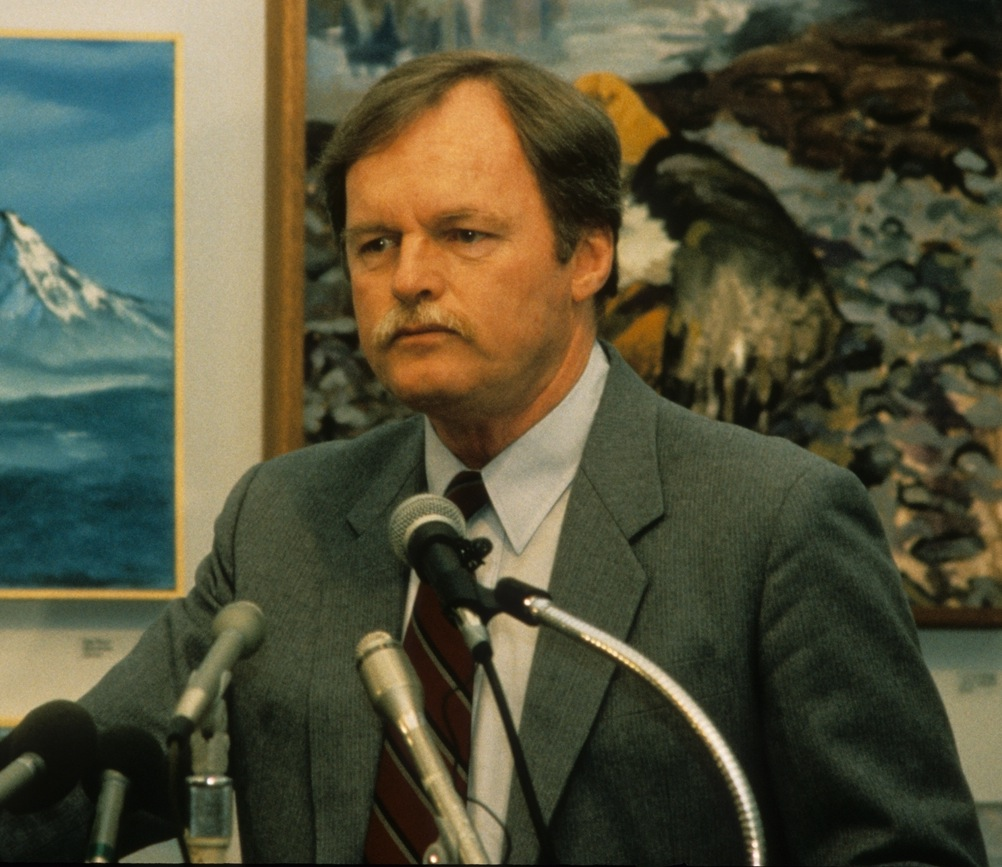
- Cowper in 1990

6th Governor of Alaska
- In office December 1, 1986 – December 3, 1990
- Lieutenant: Steve McAlpine
- Preceded by: Bill Sheffield
- Succeeded by: Wally Hickel

Member of the Alaska House of Representatives from the 20th district
- In office January 20, 1975 – January 14, 1979
- Preceded by: Multi-member district
- Succeeded by: Multi-member district

Personal details
- Born: Stephen Cambreleng Cowper; August 21, 1938 (age 88) Petersburg, Virginia, U.S.
- Party: Democratic
- Spouses: Deanna Blanco (divorced); Margaret Stewart (m. 1985; div. 1991)
- Children: 3
- Education: University of North Carolina, Chapel Hill (BA, LLB)
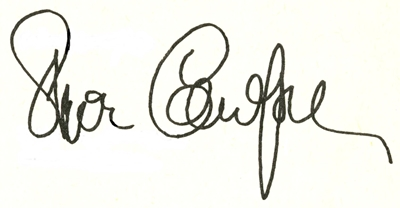
- Signature

Military service
- Branch: United States Army
- Unit: Army Medical Corps • United States Army Reserve

Stephen Cambreleng Cowper (born August 21, 1938) is an American Democratic politician who was the sixth governor of Alaska from 1986 to 1990. He was governor during the 1989 Exxon Valdez oil spill.

Cowper is the CEO of Steve Cowper & Associates. He has also served on the boards of multiple energy-related companies in the US and Canada.

== Early life and career ==
Cowper was born in 1938 in Petersburg, Virginia, to Stephanie (née Smith) and Marion Cowper. He was raised in Kinston, North Carolina and attended Virginia Episcopal School in Lynchburg, Virginia. He received bachelor's and law degrees from the University of North Carolina at Chapel Hill, and after serving in the U.S. Army Medical Corps and Army Reserve, he worked as a maritime lawyer in Norfolk, Virginia, for three years. Cowper moved to Fairbanks, Alaska, in 1968 and served as assistant district attorney for rural Alaska and Fairbanks.

In 1970, Cowper went to Vietnam and worked as a freelance correspondent throughout Asia. Upon returning to Alaska, he wrote a political column for the Fairbanks Daily News-Miner, taught a college course on Alaska lands, was a partner in an air taxi and cargo business, and worked as a diver for a University of Alaska marine research team.

== Political career ==
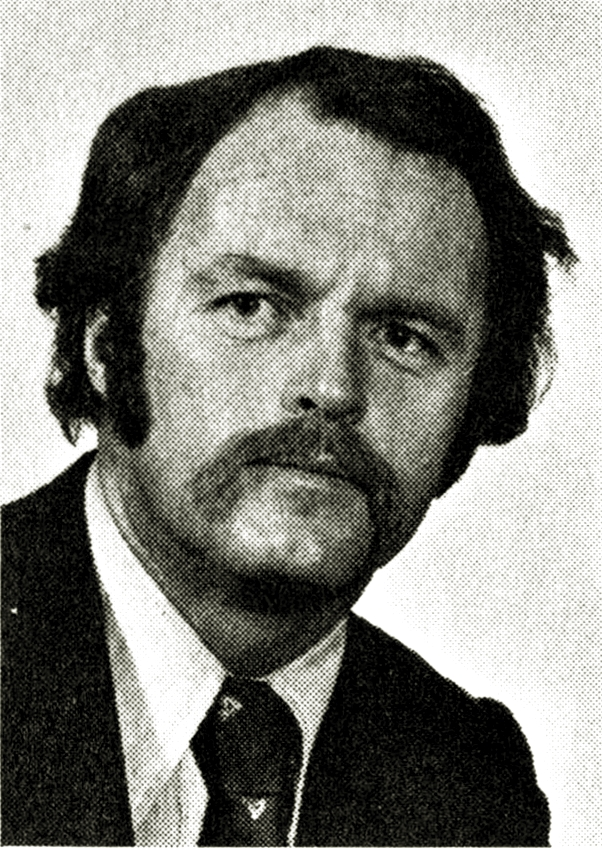
Cowper during his second term in the Alaska House of Representatives

In 1974, Cowper was elected to the Alaska House of Representatives, where he served two terms. During his time in the House, he served as chairman of the Finance Committee (1977–1978), chairman of the Steering Council on Alaska Lands (1978), a member of the Subsistence Committee (1977–1978), and a member of the Alaska Advisory Committee for the Law of the Sea Conference (1978). In 1982, Cowper ran for governor, but narrowly lost the Democratic nomination to Bill Sheffield, who went on to win the general election.

=== Governor of Alaska (1986–1990) ===
Cowper ran for governor again in 1986, and defeated incumbent Sheffield in the August 26 primary by a 2–1 margin. He eventually won the November 4 general election, winning 47% of the vote against Republican state Senator Arliss Sturgulewski and Alaskan Independence Party candidate Joe Vogler.

Once in office, Cowper proposed reestablishing the state income tax to help close the state's billion-dollar deficit; this proposal was met with strong opposition. He advocated the expansion of the University of Alaska's international study program, hoped to establish an International Trade Center, and placed emphasis on the teaching of foreign languages and culture in state schools. In early 1989, he announced that he would not seek reelection in 1990, a decision considered a surprise by some observers.

== Post-governorship ==
After serving as governor, Cowper served as a visiting fellow at the Port Authority of New York and New Jersey in 1991, and was a Co-Chairman of the Pacific Rim Fisheries Conference in 1994 and 1997.

Since 1991, he has been the CEO of Steve Cowper & Associates, a group that advises companies and governments on energy-related initiatives. He has also served on the boards of multiple energy-related companies in the US and Canada. As of 2010, Cowper lived in Austin, Texas with his third wife and family.

Party political offices
Preceded by Bill Sheffield	Democratic nominee for Governor of Alaska; 1986	Succeeded by Tony Knowles
Political offices
Preceded by Bill Sheffield	Governor of Alaska; 1986–1990	Succeeded by Wally Hickel
U.S. order of precedence (ceremonial)
Preceded by Martha McSally as Former U.S. Senator	Order of precedence of the United States; Within Alaska	Succeeded by Tony Knowles as Former Governor
Preceded by Doug Ducey as Former Governor	Order of precedence of the United States; Outside Alaska	Succeeded by Tony Knowles as Former Governor
