= Jack Coghill =

American politician (1925–2019)

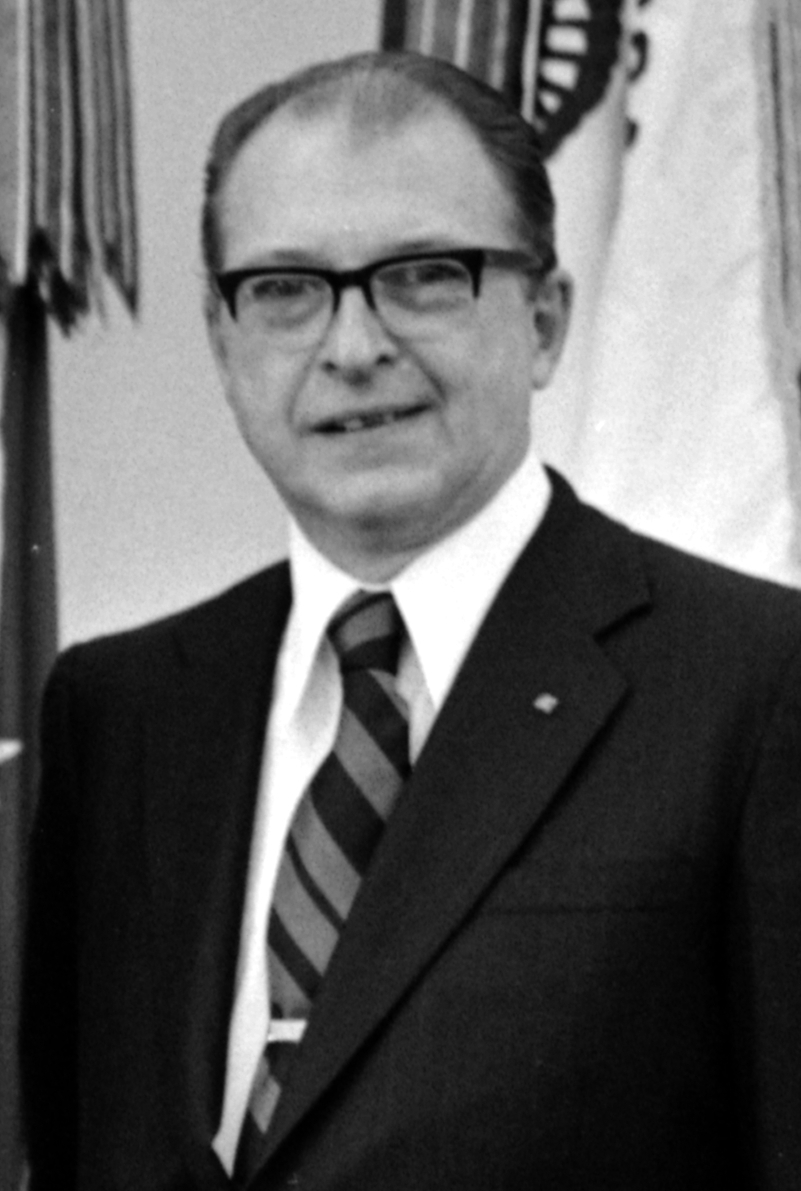
- Coghill in 1973

6th Lieutenant Governor of Alaska
- In office December 3, 1990 – December 5, 1994
- Governor: Wally Hickel
- Preceded by: Steve McAlpine
- Succeeded by: Fran Ulmer

Member of the Alaska Senate
- In office January 1985 – December 3, 1990
- Preceded by: H. Pappy Moss
- Succeeded by: Dick Shultz
- Constituency: District J
- In office January 1959 – January 3, 1965
- Preceded by: New district
- Succeeded by: Grant H. Pearson
- Constituency: District L

Personal details
- Born: September 24, 1925 Fairbanks, Territory of Alaska, U.S. (now Alaska, U.S.)
- Died: February 13, 2019 (aged 93) North Pole, Alaska, U.S.
- Party: Republican (before 1990, 1994–2019); Alaskan Independence (1990–1994)
- Spouse: Frances Gilbert
- Children: 6, including John

John Bruce "Jack" Coghill (September 24, 1925 – February 13, 2019) was an American politician and businessman who was the sixth lieutenant governor of Alaska from 1990 to 1994, serving under Governor Walter Hickel. Both were members of the Alaskan Independence Party.

Originally elected as the Republican Party's lieutenant governor nominee in 1990, Coghill had faced serious compatibility issues with running mate Arliss Sturgulewski. AIP chair Joe Vogler vacated his party's nominated slate of John Lindauer and Jerry Ward and replaced them with Wally Hickel and Coghill. While Hickel turned his back on the AIP and their platform almost immediately after taking office, Coghill remained loyal to the party, even becoming their gubernatorial nominee in 1994. Prior to these events, he was well known in Alaskan political circles as "Mr. Republican."

== Career ==
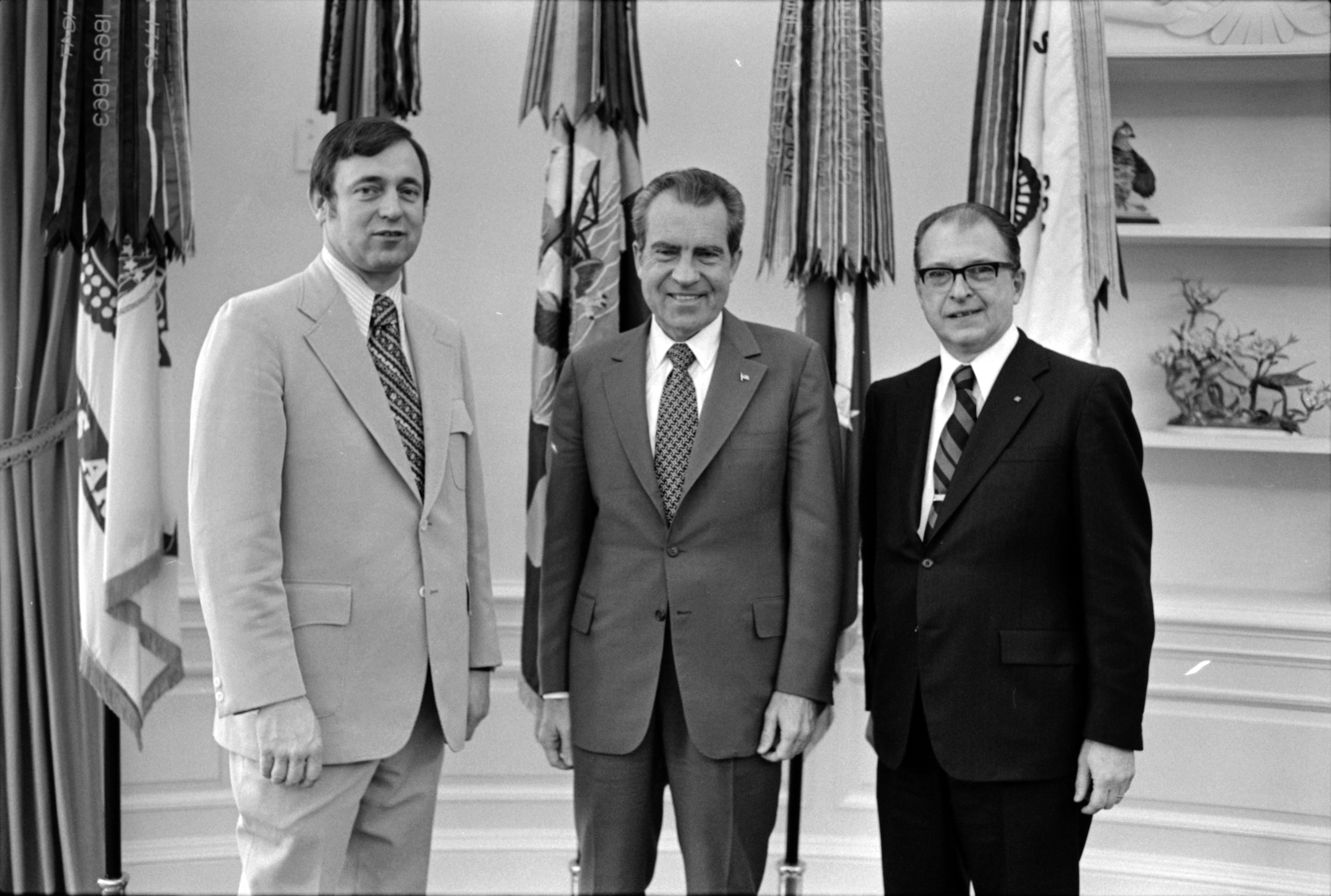
Coghill with President Richard Nixon and U.S. Representative Don Young in 1973

Coghill was born in Fairbanks in 1925. In his prior political career, he was best known by many for being the mayor of Nenana in the interior of Alaska for 22 years. Coghill served in the territorial and state legislatures of Alaska for a number of years. He was elected to the territorial House in 1952 and again in 1956, representing the 4th District, which encompassed the interior and portions of southwestern Alaska. After statehood, he served as a senator in the first three state legislatures. Coghill ran unopposed in 1960 and did not run for re-election in 1964.

He would be once again elected to the state Senate in 1984, and served until he resigned on December 3, 1990 to assume the post of lieutenant governor. Coghill was also elected to Alaska's constitutional convention, serving as one of the 55 Club (55 members wrote the constitution in 55 days) and his copy of the constitution hangs in Constitution Hall on the University of Alaska Fairbanks campus. He received an honorary doctorate from the University of Alaska Fairbanks in 2004.

== Personal life ==
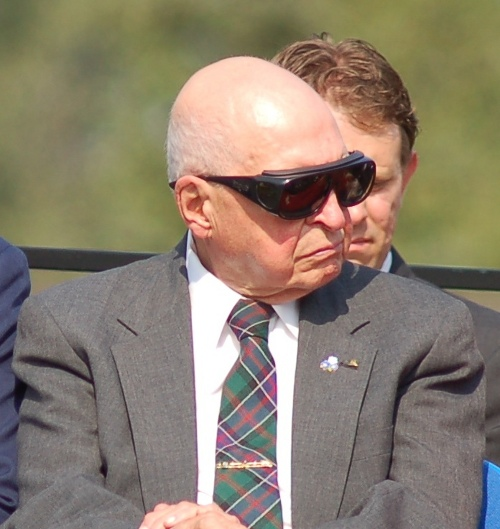
Coghill in 2009

He married Frances Gilbert, from Fairbanks, and had six children: Patty, John Jr. (who succeeded him as a state legislator), twins Jerry and Jim, Paula, and Jeff. His father, William A. Coghill, emigrated to the United States from Scotland and chose to come straight to Alaska. He was a pioneer who hiked to the Interior from Valdez, worked as a printer for what is now the Fairbanks Daily News-Miner, and then opened a trading post in Nenana. The Coghill General Store is still in operation and owned by the family.

Coghill had two older brothers, William F. (deceased, Col. U.S. Army Ret. and former CFO of the Alaska Railroad) and Robert A. Sr. (deceased, managed Coghill's Store after the death of William A.), who stayed in Alaska their entire lives. He published his autobiography, "Growing up in Alaska" in 2009 describing his personal and political life in the 49th state, as one of its last surviving state constitution signatories. Coghill died on February 13, 2019, at the age of 93.

Alaska Senate
Preceded by New district	Member of the Alaska Senate from the L district 1959–1965	Succeeded by Grant H. Pearson
Preceded by H. Pappy Moss	Member of the Alaska Senate from the J district 1985–1990	Succeeded by Dick Shultz
Political offices
Preceded by Steve McAlpine	Lieutenant Governor of Alaska; 1990–1994	Succeeded by Fran Ulmer
Party political offices
Preceded by Terry Miller	Republican nominee for Lieutenant Governor of Alaska; 1990	Succeeded by Jim Campbell
Preceded by Jerry Ward	Alaskan Independence nominee for Lieutenant Governor of Alaska; 1990	Succeeded by Margaret Ward
Preceded by Wally Hickel	Alaskan Independence nominee for Governor of Alaska; 1994	Succeeded by Sylvia Sullivan
