= Jay Hammond =

Governor of Alaska from 1974 to 1982

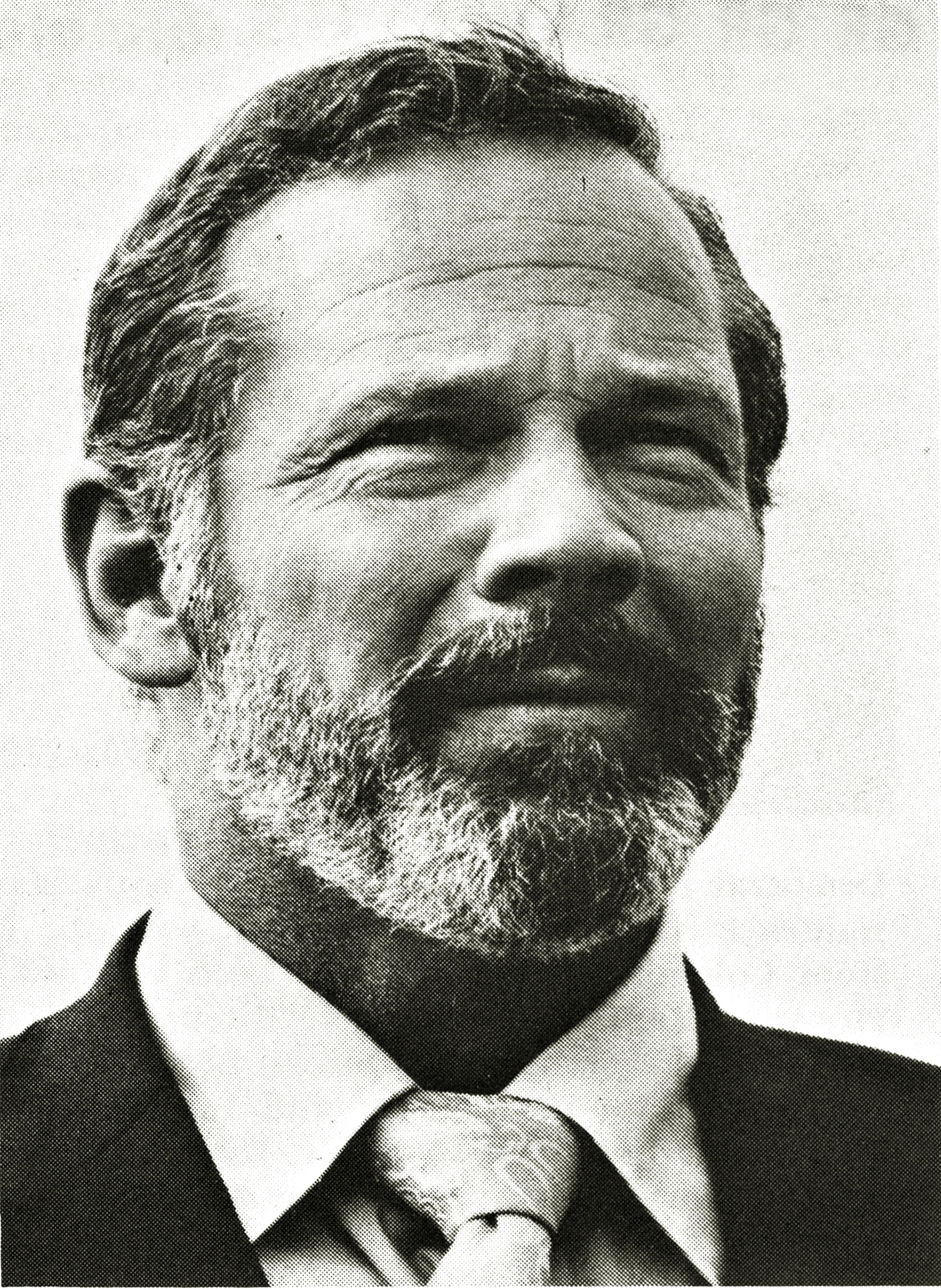
- Hammond in 1975

4th Governor of Alaska
- In office December 2, 1974 – December 6, 1982
- Lieutenant: Lowell Thomas Jr. Terry Miller
- Preceded by: Bill Egan
- Succeeded by: Bill Sheffield

President of the Alaska Senate
- In office January 11, 1971 – January 8, 1973
- Preceded by: Brad Phillips
- Succeeded by: Terry Miller

Member of the Alaska Senate from the H district
- In office January 23, 1967 – January 8, 1973
- Preceded by: Yule F. Kilcher
- Succeeded by: George Hohman

Member of the Alaska House of Representatives from the 13th district
- In office January 28, 1963 – January 25, 1965
- Preceded by: Gilbert A. Jarvela; Peter M. Deveau
- Succeeded by: Joseph E. McGill

Member of the Alaska House of Representatives from the 15th district
- In office January 26, 1959 – January 28, 1963
- Preceded by: District created
- Succeeded by: Grant H. Pearson

Personal details
- Born: Jay Sterner Hammond; July 21, 1922 Troy, New York, U.S.
- Died: August 2, 2005 (aged 83) Port Alsworth, Alaska, U.S.
- Party: Republican
- Other political affiliations: Independent (1958–1960)
- Spouse: Bella Gardiner (m. 1952)
- Children: 3
- Education: Pennsylvania State University; University of Alaska, Fairbanks (BA)
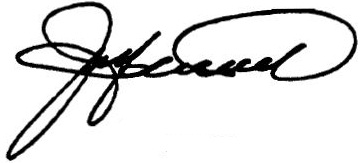
- Signature

Military service
- Allegiance: United States
- Branch/service: United States Marine Corps
- Years of service: 1942–1946
- Unit: Black Sheep Squadron
- Battles/wars: World War II

Jay Sterner Hammond (July 21, 1922 – August 2, 2005) was an American politician of the Republican Party, who served as the fourth governor of Alaska from 1974 to 1982. Hammond was born in Troy, New York and served as a Marine Corps fighter pilot in World War II with the Black Sheep Squadron. In 1946, he moved to Alaska where he worked as a bush pilot. Hammond served as a state representative from 1959 to 1965 and as a state senator from 1967 to 1973. From 1972 until 1974 he was the mayor of the Bristol Bay Borough. Then, in 1974, he was elected governor of Alaska.

He oversaw the creation of the Alaska Permanent Fund in 1976, which, since the early 1980s, has paid annual dividends to Alaska residents. He advocated for fiscal conservatism. When his tenure as governor was over, he continued to be active in public life. He advocated for environmentally and fiscally responsible government and individual civic responsibility. From 1985 to 1992 he hosted a television series called Jay Hammond's Alaska. He wrote three autobiographies.

== Early life ==
Jay Sterner Hammond was born in Troy, New York in 1922. Hammond studied petroleum engineering at Penn State University, where he was a member of Triangle Fraternity. He later served as a Marine Corps fighter pilot in World War II with the Black Sheep Squadron, and in China, until 1946. That year, Hammond moved to Alaska where he worked as a bush pilot and earned a degree in biological sciences at the University of Alaska.

Hammond had one daughter, Wendy, with his first wife, Henrietta "Hank" Juve, but that marriage ended in divorce. In 1952, Hammond married his second wife, Bella Gardiner, with whom he had two daughters, Heidi and Dana.

== Political career ==
=== Alaska Legislature ===
Hammond served as a state representative from 1959 to 1965 and as a state senator from 1967 to 1973. Hammond served in the 1st Alaska State Legislature as an independent, joining thirty-four Democrats and five Republicans in the forty-member House. At the time, Hammond believed that a Republican could not be elected in that particular time and place, but that he could not envision running as a Democrat on account of his upbringing and background. He did serve as a Republican in subsequent legislatures, however. He was Senate President in his final two years in the legislature.

During his tenure in the Alaska Senate, Hammond held other significant leadership roles, including serving as Senate Majority Leader and as chair of the Rules and Resources committee. Known for his efforts to balance conservation with economic development, Hammond was a key proponent of new environmental and resource management policies. Notably, he proposed a state limited-entry fisheries regime to manage and protect Alaska's fishing resources, a concept he championed as a legislator before his time as governor.

=== Bristol Bay Borough ===
Hammond was the mayor of the Bristol Bay Borough from 1972 to 1974. He had previously served as the borough's manager from 1965 to 1967, a role he took on in part to address local sanitation problems. During this period as manager, Hammond developed a local economic concept he called "Bristol Bay, Inc." The proposal involved a "use tax" on all fishermen, with the revenue to be placed into a conservatively managed investment account that would pay dividends to every resident. While the proposal was ultimately defeated, it served as an early model for what would later become his signature achievement, the Alaska Permanent Fund.

=== Governor of Alaska ===
Hammond was elected governor in 1974 in a close result over incumbent William A. Egan. The race was complicated by two major factors, amongst others. One was a reversal of roles of sorts, where Hammond and his running mate Lowell Thomas Jr. were identified as conservationists, confusing and splitting the traditional party base. The other was the appearance, for the first time, of a substantial third-party candidate, Fairbanks miner and real estate developer Joe Vogler. Vogler's open contempt for the environmental movement created a further voter rift which no doubt helped Hammond.

As governor during the biggest economic boom in Alaska's history, the construction of the Trans-Alaska Pipeline System, Hammond oversaw the creation of the Alaska Permanent Fund. The concept of the Permanent Fund, originally championed in 1969 by then-governor Keith Miller and Anchorage Times publisher and editor Robert Atwood on the eve of the Prudhoe Bay oil lease sale, lay dormant for years as a result of the legislature spending the proceeds of the lease sale and construction delays associated with the pipeline. During his first term as governor, Hammond, along with a young state representative from Kenai named Hugh Malone, conceived a program to invest oil royalties to cover future state budget shortfalls as well as create a long-term savings account. Alaska voters approved a constitutional amendment establishing the Permanent Fund in 1976, one of the rare exceptions to the constitutional intent of not dedicating funds for a specific purpose.

Hammond sought a second term in 1978, but first faced a contentious Republican primary challenge from former governor Wally Hickel. The race was exceptionally close and was decided by a razor-thin margin. After the votes were tallied, Hammond was declared the winner by only 98 votes, with a final count of 31,921 to Hickel's 31,823. Hickel contested the result in court, alleging "malconduct" by election officials. The case, Hammond v. Hickel, reached the Alaska Supreme Court, which ultimately upheld Hammond's primary victory, finding that while some "minor irregularities" had occurred, they were not "sufficient to cast substantial doubt on the outcome of the vote." Undeterred, Hickel ran in the general election as a write-in candidate, where he came in second place, but Hammond ultimately won re-election.

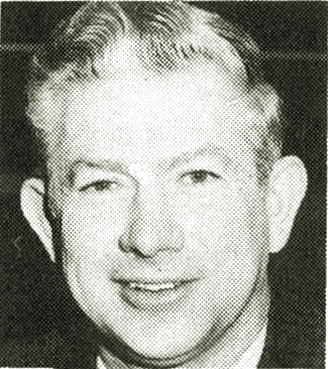
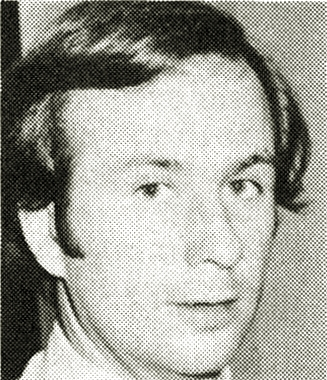
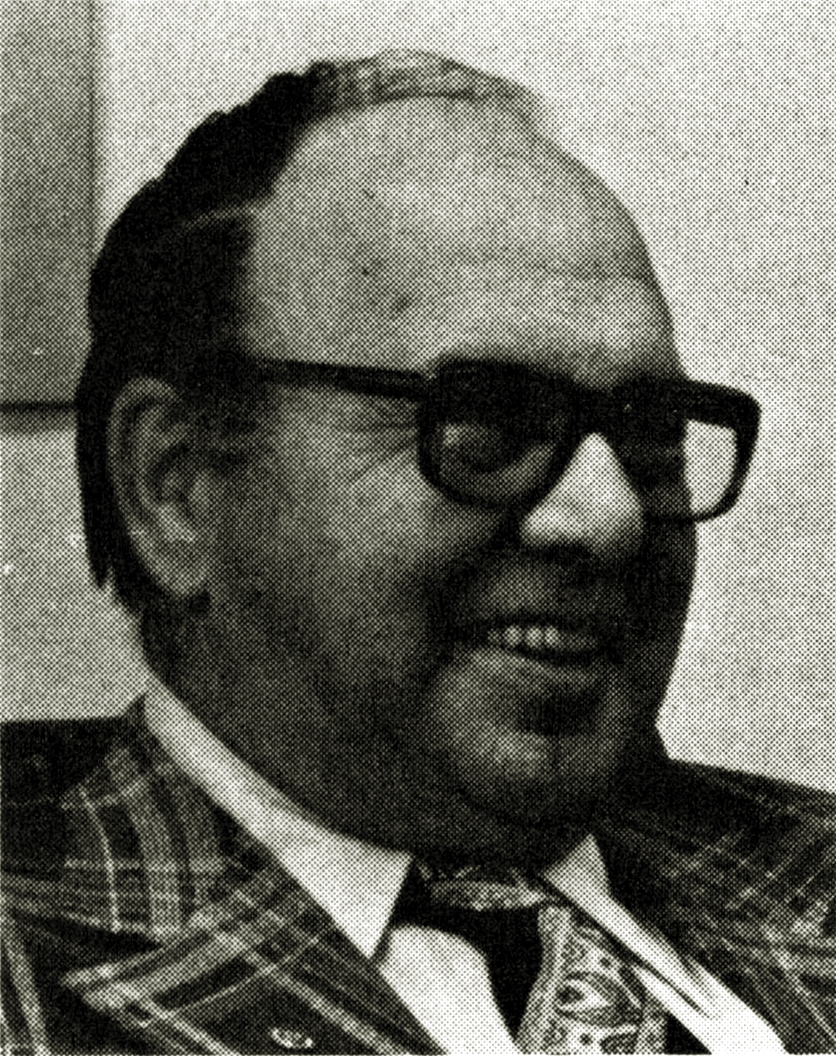
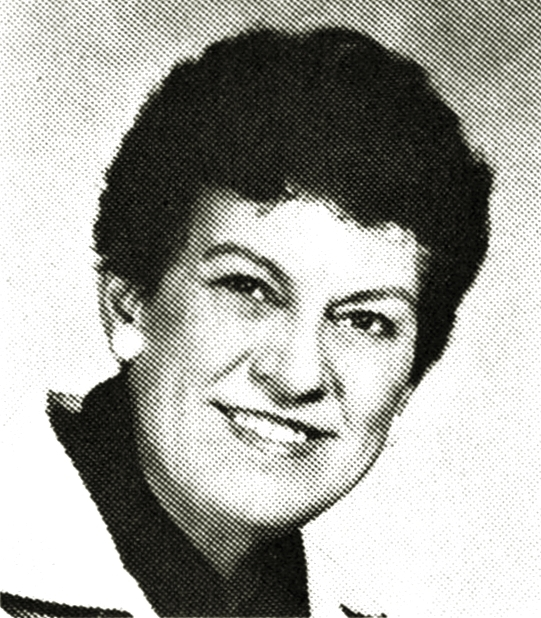
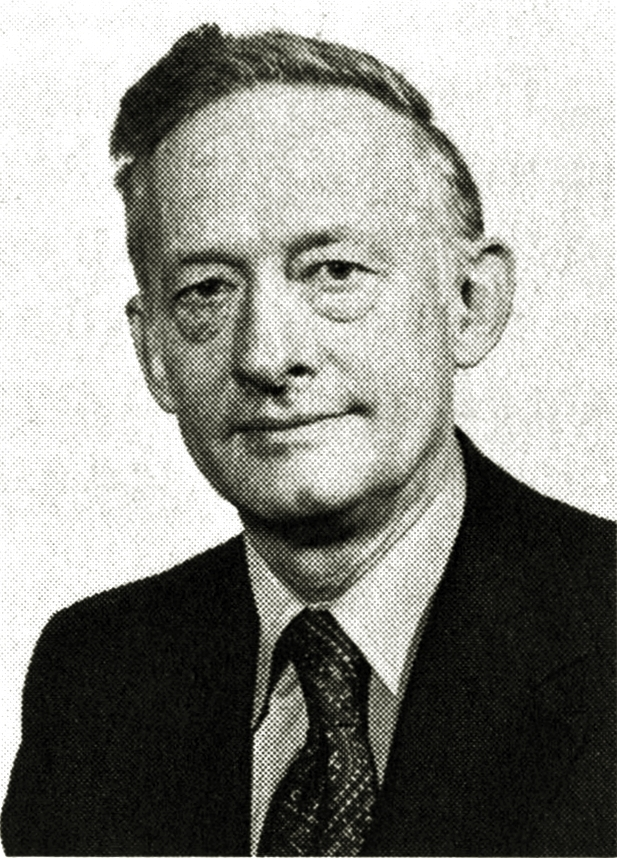
When Hammond defeated Egan for the governorship in 1974, he recruited a number of legislators to serve in his cabinet and in the governor's office. From left: senator W. I. "Bob" Palmer (R-Ninilchik; chief of staff and later policy advisor), representative Andy Warwick (R-Fairbanks; commissioner of administration) and representative-elect Ed Orbeck (D-Fairbanks; commissioner of labor) joined the Hammond administration at the onset. Representatives Helen Dittman Beirne (R-Anchorage; commissioner of health and social services) and Keith Specking (R-Hope; policy advisor) both left the legislature to join the administration two years later.

Since the early 1980s, the Permanent Fund has paid annual dividends to Alaska residents, under a program in which credit has been variously given to, or taken by, Hammond, Malone, Libertarian state representative Dick Randolph and numerous other Alaskan politicians of the day. At around the same time, Alaska eliminated its state income tax. Hammond is often erroneously credited for this; in fact, he was actually staunchly opposed to the idea. The elimination of the income tax was actually championed by Randolph, who persuaded his fellow legislators to pass the bill after mounting an initiative to force a public vote should the legislature not act. A 1980 episode of the public television program Alaska Review (currently held in the collections of the Alaska Film Archives) prominently featured an edited "debate" between Hammond and Randolph on the subject, centered on the fact that Alaska faced a one-billion-dollar budget surplus that year.

As governor, Hammond advocated for fiscal responsibility, and introduced an amendment to the Alaska Constitution limiting state spending. This was mocked by one legislator as "Spendy Limitation," with an accompanying elegant and obfuscatory statement mimicking Hammond's unique way with the English language. He advocated for another constitutional amendment providing for governors to serve a single 6-year term without possibility of further service. He felt it would allow governors a free hand in accomplishing their goals. He also championed a program which opened large amounts of state-owned lands near Delta Junction for agricultural use. While greater aspects of the program have been variously condemned as a "boondoggle" over the years, Delta Junction has managed to emerge as one of the larger agricultural producing communities in Alaska. He also vigorously fought with the legislature over power struggles between the two branches of government, culminating with four proposed constitutional amendments on the 1980 ballot, all of which failed by large margins.

== Later life ==
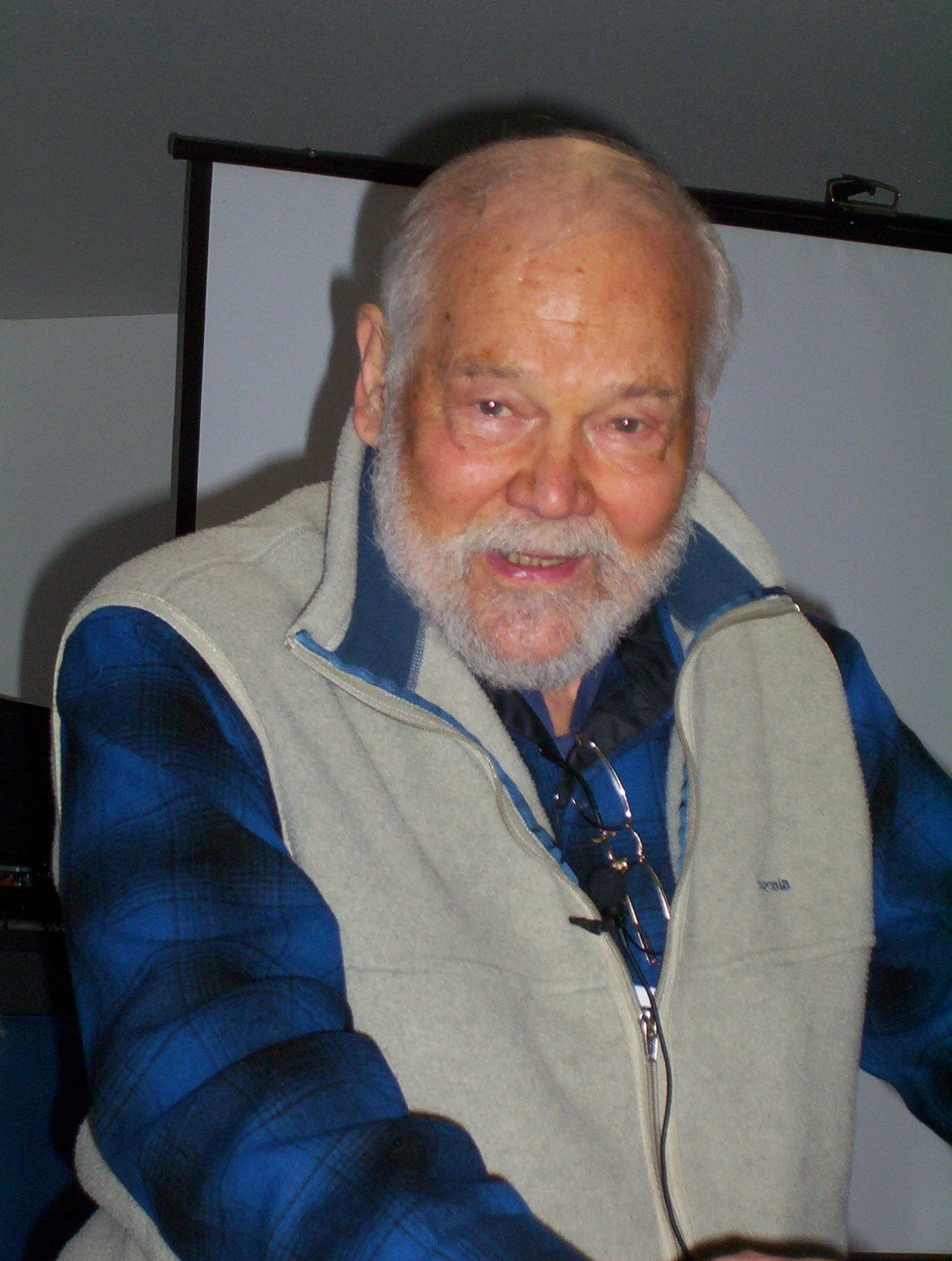
Hammond during the last year of his life

After his tenure as governor, Hammond continued to be active in public life. He advocated for environmentally and fiscally responsible government, and individual civic responsibility. Hammond wrote articles for newspapers in Alaska, and appeared in public service announcements on television. He hosted a television series called Jay Hammond's Alaska from 1985 to 1992. Hammond survived a rafting accident on August 6, 1988, while shooting an episode of the series on the Tana River in Wrangell-St. Elias National Park. Killed in the accident were Larry Holmstrom, the show's executive producer, Holmstrom's daughter Maria, and cameraman Ronald Eagle. Three others on the raft besides Hammond also survived, including one who also fell into the water of the Class IV river.

Hammond wrote three autobiographies, Tales of Alaska's Bush Rat Governor: The Extraordinary Autobiography of Jay Hammond, Wilderness Guide and Reluctant Politician, Chips from the Chopping Block: More Tales from Alaska's Bush Rat Governor and Diapering The Devil: How Alaska Helped Staunch Befouling by Mismanaged Oil Wealth; a Lesson for Other Rich Nations. The latter book, published in 2011, was co-edited by Hammond's granddaughter Lauren Stanford. Hammond also wrote the preface to Brother Asaiah, As Remembered by Martha Ellen Anderson and Friends, a memoir of the life of Homer businessman and peace activist Brother Asaiah Bates, which was published in 2006 following the deaths of both Bates and Hammond.

Hammond's last major public appearances were in early 2004, centered around the Conference of Alaskans convened by governor Frank Murkowski. Murkowski, recalling the spirit of the constitutional convention, assembled fifty-five delegates from across Alaska to meet at the University of Alaska Fairbanks to tackle specific questions regarding Alaska's fiscal future. Apart from launching the political career of Mark Neuman, who proclaimed himself to be one of the few ordinary people amongst the delegates and who was elected to the state house later that year, little was accomplished by the conference in the end. Hammond spent much of the conference holding court outside of the Wood Center ballroom where sessions were held, espousing his own solutions, which included doubling the amount of the Permanent Fund dividend and restoring the state income tax, the latter of which was strongly opposed by Murkowski. The delegates responded to Hammond by endorsing an income tax proposal, which delegate Clark Gruening described as a "declaration of independence" from Murkowski. Several weeks after the conference, Hammond spoke before Commonwealth North, proclaiming that he would spend $50,000 of his own money if necessary to campaign for his dividend and income tax plan.

== Death ==
Hammond lived at his homestead on Lake Clark, until his death at age 83 on August 2, 2005. According to his wife, Bella, he died peacefully in his sleep.

Alaska House of Representatives
Preceded by District created	Member of the Alaska House of Representatives from the 15th district 1959–1963	Succeeded by Grant H. Pearson
Preceded by Gilbert A. Jarvela; Peter M. Deveau	Member of the Alaska House of Representatives from the 13th district 1963–1965	Succeeded by Joseph E. McGill
Alaska Senate
Preceded by Yule F. Kilcher	Member of the Alaska Senate from the H district 1967–1973	Succeeded by George Hohman
Political offices
Preceded by Brad Phillips	President of the Alaska Senate; 1971–1973	Succeeded by Terry Miller
Preceded by Bill Egan	Governor of Alaska; 1974–1982	Succeeded by Bill Sheffield
Party political offices
Preceded by Keith Harvey Miller	Republican nominee for Governor of Alaska; 1974, 1978	Succeeded by Tom Fink
