= John Howard Lindauer =

American economist and politician (born 1937)

John Lindauer
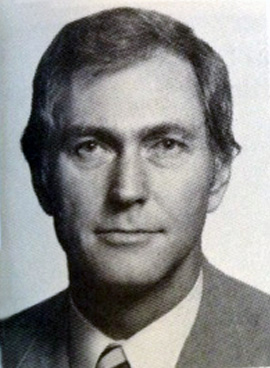

Member of the Alaska House of Representatives from the 10B district
- In office January 1983 – January 1985
- Preceded by: ???
- Succeeded by: Virginia Collins

Personal details
- Born: November 20, 1937 (age 88) Montclair, New Jersey, U.S.
- Party: Republican (Before 1990; 1997–present); Independence (1990–1997)
- Spouse(s): Jacqueline Shelly (1932–1992); Dorothy Oremus (m. 1995)
- Children: 2, Susan
- Education: Arizona State University, Tempe (BS); Oklahoma State University (MA, PhD)

John Howard Lindauer II (born November 20, 1937) is an American economist who served as chancellor for the University of Alaska Anchorage from 1976 to 1978 then was Dean of the School of Business and Public Affairs. He was the Republican Party candidate for governor of Alaska in 1998, but ultimately ended up pleading no contest to campaign finance violations. He is the father of Susan Lindauer and John Howard Lindauer III, and lived in Alaska from 1976 until 2002, when he moved to Chicago.

== Biography ==
Lindauer was born on November 20, 1937, to Louise (1910–2004) and John Howard Lindauer I (1905–1954) in Montclair, New Jersey. He attended North Phoenix High School from 1951 to 1954 and Arizona State University from where he received a Bachelor of Science in Business Administration. He later attended Oklahoma State University where he received a Ph.D. in economics.

He served in the United States Army for three years and spent five years in the Army Reserve.

Lindauer was assistant professor of economics at Occidental College from 1964 to 1966. He then became an associate professor and full professor at Claremont McKenna College and the Claremont Graduate School from 1966 to 1974, at which time he became dean of the business school at Murray State University in Kentucky.

=== Alaska ===
He then moved to Alaska and served as chancellor for the University of Alaska Anchorage from 1976 to 1978 then was dean of the School of Business and Public Affairs.

Lindauer served as one of the state commissioners for the Trans-Alaska Pipeline System, and later worked at the Alaska Post-Secondary Education Commission. With his first wife, Jacqueline S. Lindauer, he was the co-publisher of Alaska Rural Newspapers which published ten newspapers. He was builder and president of Denali Broadcasting and the Alaska Radio Network which owns five radio stations.

In 1982 Lindauer won a seat for District 10 in the Alaska House of Representatives. He was a member of the House Finance Committee. As a member of the Alaskan Independence Party, he started to run for Governor of Alaska in 1990, but withdrew from the campaign after the illness of his wife.

In the 1998 election, Lindauer won the Republican primary to run for Governor of Alaska. Leading up to the election he spent $1.7 million on his campaign. However, it was later revealed that nearly all the money he spent on the election came from his second wife, Chicago attorney Dorothy Oremus, and was not his own money. Later, he pleaded no contest to charges stemming from campaign finance problems. As a result, he received a one-year suspended sentence, 100 hours of community service, 2 years of probation, and a $15,000 fine. After the sentence, he stated through his lawyer that he would move back to Chicago.

== Select publications ==
- Macroeconomics (1968, 1972, 1976), ISBN 0-471-53572-9
- Stabilization Inflation and the Inflation-Unemployment Trade-off
- Land Taxation and Indian Economic Development (with Sarjit Singh) 1974
- The General Theories of Inflation, Unemployment, and Government Deficits 1968, reissued 2012

Party political offices
Preceded by Joe Vogler	Alaskan Independence nominee for Governor of Alaska; 1990	Succeeded by Wally Hickel
Preceded by Jim Campbell	Republican nominee for Governor of Alaska; 1998 (disavowed); Served alongside: Robin L. Taylor (endorsed)	Succeeded by Frank Murkowski
