= Terry Miller (politician) =

American businessman and politician (1942–1989)

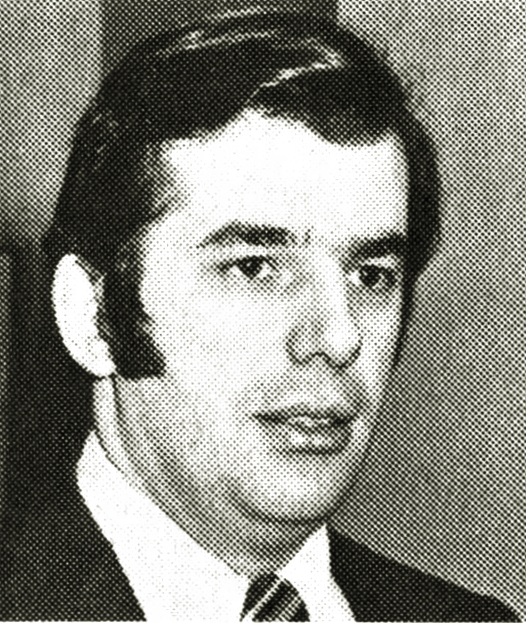

4th Lieutenant Governor of Alaska
- In office December 4, 1978 – December 6, 1982
- Governor: Jay Hammond
- Preceded by: Lowell Thomas Jr.
- Succeeded by: Steve McAlpine

Member of the Alaska Senate
- In office 1969–1977

Member of the Alaska House of Representatives
- In office 1966–1969

Personal details
- Born: Terrence Brent Miller; November 10, 1942 San Francisco, California, U.S.
- Died: April 13, 1989 (aged 46) Seattle, Washington, U.S.
- Party: Republican
- Spouse(s): Janice Dani Bowman, 1976
- Children: 2

Terrence Brent Miller (November 10, 1942 – April 13, 1989) was an American businessman and politician. Miller served as the fourth lieutenant governor of Alaska from 1978 to 1982. His political career, which began while he was in his early 20s, lasted over two decades and was cut short by his death from lung cancer at age 46.

== Early life ==
Terry Miller was born in San Francisco, California on November 10, 1942, the second of four children and second of three sons of Con B. and Nellie Miller. Con Miller came to Fairbanks, Alaska in 1949 and soon began working as a fur trader in rural Interior Alaska. Not long after, he brought the rest of his family to Alaska and settled in the Davis Subdivision, about 15 miles (24 km) southeast of Fairbanks. This became the fledgling community of North Pole, where the Miller family established a trading post and general store along the Richardson Highway called the Santa Claus House in 1952. For many years, the Santa Claus House also served as North Pole's post office.

Miller attended school in North Pole and Fairbanks, graduating from Lathrop High School in 1961. He then attended the University of Alaska, where he was a member of Alpha Phi Omega. He graduated from UA with a Bachelor of Arts degree in 1965.

== Political career ==
The Miller family were politically active. Con Miller served on North Pole's first city council in 1953, and later served as mayor of North Pole. Nellie Miller was also active in local politics.

Terry Miller was elected to the North Pole city council, taking office two days after his 21st birthday, which was the minimum age for the office. Not long after, the Fairbanks North Star Borough was incorporated and he was appointed the city council's representative to the borough assembly, its governing body (or legislative branch). Miller was the youngest member of the FNSB assembly, and as the body's presiding officer in 1965, the youngest person to hold that office.

In 1966, he was elected to represent Fairbanks in the Alaska House of Representatives. He campaigned little, as he was drafted into military service that year. He completed basic training at Fort Ord, then began a long stint in the National Guard. After one term in the House, he was elected to the Alaska Senate. He served in the Senate from 1969 to 1977, and was the Senate's president during the 8th Alaska State Legislature (1973 to 1975).

He was elected lieutenant governor and served from 1978 to 1982. His chief of staff as lieutenant governor was Pete Rouse, whom Miller met while both attended the John F. Kennedy School of Government. Rouse, in turn, recruited a young newspaper editor named Kim Elton to work in the lieutenant governor's office. Both Elton and Rouse would go on to become officials in the administration of U.S. president Barack Obama.

Miller also ran unsuccessfully for the Republican nomination for U.S. Senate in 1974, and the Republican nomination for governor in 1982. In both cases, he lost the primary election to more conservative opponents (C. R. Lewis in 1974, Tom Fink in 1982), who went on to lose to their Democratic opponents in the general election. In 1986, Miller once again won the Republican nomination for lieutenant governor, running on the Republican ticket alongside Arliss Sturgulewski.

== Business career ==
Miller was involved with his family in the management of the Santa Claus House, which evolved from its humble beginnings to its modern-day incarnation as a tourist attraction centered around a Christmas-themed gift shop. The Miller family later established a similar business in Anchorage, at the corner of the Seward Highway and O'Malley Road. The Anchorage venture was short-lived, however; the building now houses a ski shop.

Along with several partners, Miller launched an unsuccessful attempt in 1983 to purchase Alaska magazine from Robert A. "Bob" Henning, the magazine's publisher of a quarter century. Henning sold the magazine several years later, citing ill health. Miller's partners in this venture were later responsible for building The Center, a short-lived entertainment complex in west Fairbanks, currently home to the Fairbanks Sears store.

== Death and legacy ==
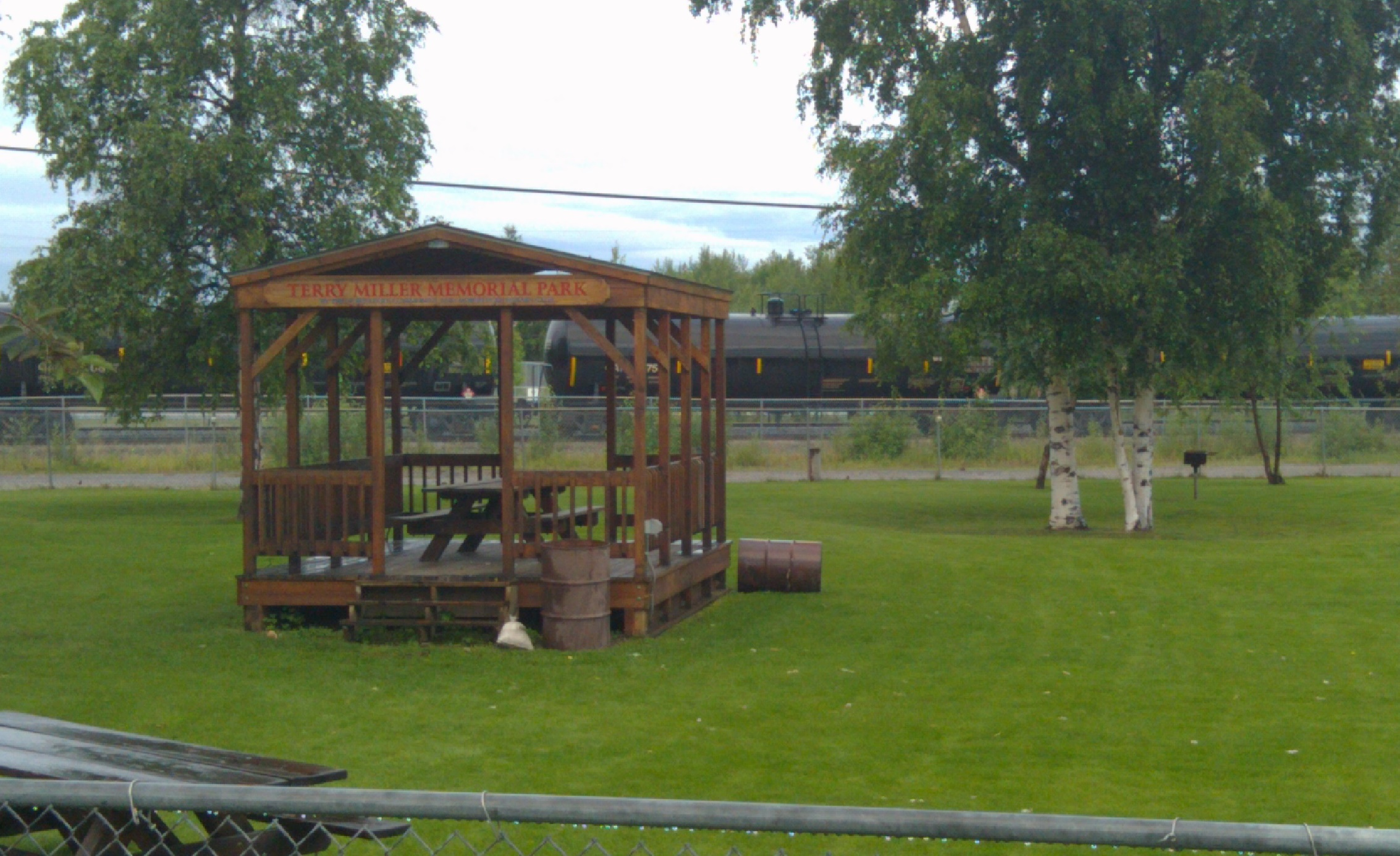
Terry Miller Memorial Park on an early morning in June 2011. Tanker cars parked at an Alaska Railroad siding, serving the now-closed oil refinery which was a major part of North Pole's economy for several decades, can be seen in the background.

Miller was diagnosed with bone cancer in 1988. He moved to Seattle, Washington to begin treatment, but the cancer continued to spread. He died at his Seattle home on the morning of April 13, 1989, at age 46.

The former Juneau High School building in downtown Juneau was purchased by the Alaska Legislature and renovated to accommodate legislative offices. The building was christened the Terry Miller Legislative Office Building, pursuant to legislation sponsored by Senator Jerry Ward. A park in North Pole, located on part of the original Santa Claus House site, was named the Terry Miller Memorial Park.

== Personal life ==
Miller married Terry Lucille Niemann in Palmer, Alaska on July 20, 1963. They had a daughter, Jennifer. In 1976 Miller married Janice Dani Bowman, MD, Phd, and had a daughter, Amanda Leslie in 1981.

His younger brother Mike W. Miller (born 1951) followed in his political footsteps. Mike Miller represented North Pole in both houses of the Alaska Legislature from 1983 to 2001. He also was a member of Governor Frank Murkowski's cabinet, serving as commissioner of the Alaska Department of Administration.

Political offices
Preceded by Jay Hammond	President of the Alaska Senate; 1973 – 1975	Succeeded by Chancy Croft
Preceded by Lowell Thomas Jr.	Lieutenant Governor of Alaska; 1978 – 1982	Succeeded by Steve McAlpine
Party political offices
Preceded by Lowell Thomas Jr.	Republican nominee for Alaska lieutenant governor 1978 (won)	Succeeded by Mike Colletta
Preceded by Mike Colletta	Republican nominee for Alaska lieutenant governor 1986 (lost)	Succeeded by Jack Coghill (1)
Notes and references
1. Withdrew after his nomination, replaced on the general election ballot by Jim Campbell.
