= Steve McAlpine =

American politician (born 1949)

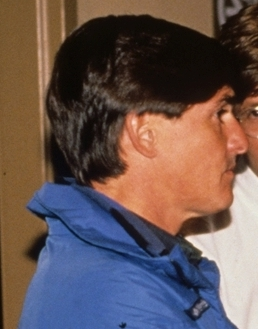

5th Lieutenant Governor of Alaska
- In office December 6, 1982 – December 3, 1990
- Governor: Bill Sheffield; Steve Cowper
- Preceded by: Terry Miller
- Succeeded by: Jack Coghill

29th Chair of the National Lieutenant Governors Association
- In office 1988–1989
- Preceded by: George Ryan
- Succeeded by: Bobby Brantley

Mayor of Valdez, Alaska
- In office 1980–1982
- Preceded by: Bill Walker
- Succeeded by: Susy Collins

Personal details
- Born: Stephen Alan McAlpine; May 23, 1949 (age 77) Yakima, Washington, U.S.
- Party: Democratic
- Parent(s): Robert E. McAlpine; Myrtle B. McAlpine (née Loomis)
- Education: Maryknoll Seminary
- Alma mater: University of Washington (BA); Seattle Law School (JD)
- Profession: Lawyer

Stephen Alan "Steve" McAlpine (born May 23, 1949) is an American lawyer and politician. McAlpine served as the fifth lieutenant governor of Alaska from 1982 until 1990.

== Early life ==
Stephen Alan McAlpine was born in Yakima, Washington on May 23, 1949, the fourth child of Robert E. and Myrtle B. (née Loomis) McAlpine. He attended school in Yakima, as well as two years at Maryknoll Seminary in Mountain View, California. He attended the University of Washington, graduating with a degree in history and political science. He later graduated from the University of Puget Sound School of Law in 1976 with a J.D. degree.

McAlpine originally came to Alaska in 1970 accompanied by a friend from college, Mano Frey. The two visited Alaska while taking a break from studies and decided to stay, settling in Valdez. They worked construction during the building of the trans-Alaska pipeline. McAlpine continued law school until he graduated, while Frey would go on to become a major labor union figure in Alaska, serving as head of Alaska's AFL-CIO from 1984 to 2002.

== Law career ==
In 1977, McAlpine partnered with James D. Ginotti in the Law Firm of Ginotti & McAlpine, PC.

Following the end of his tenure in elected office (see below), McAlpine moved to Anchorage, Alaska and resumed the practice of law, which he continues to the present day.

== Political career ==
=== Local politics ===
During the late 1970s, McAlpine was elected to the Valdez city council and went on to serve two terms as mayor of Valdez.

=== Lieutenant governor ===
In 1982, he was elected as lieutenant governor of Alaska, serving with Democratic governor Bill Sheffield, an Anchorage hotelier. Sheffield, plagued by various scandals in his administration during his term as governor, lost renomination in the 1986 primary election to Steve Cowper, a Fairbanks lawyer and former state representative. McAlpine won renomination as lieutenant governor, however, and in the general election, was reelected alongside Cowper.

As his tenure as lieutenant governor occurred during the Exxon Valdez oil spill, McAlpine found himself the subject of national media attention, particularly given his ties to Valdez.

McAlpine ran for governor in 1990, but lost in the Democratic primary election to Tony Knowles.

== See also ==
- List of mayors of Valdez, Alaska

Party political offices
Preceded by Katie Hurley	Democratic nominee for Lieutenant Governor of Alaska; 1982, 1986	Succeeded by Willie Hensley
Political offices
Preceded by Terry Miller	Lieutenant Governor of Alaska; 1982–1990	Succeeded by Jack Coghill
