= Arliss Sturgulewski =

American politician (1927–2022)

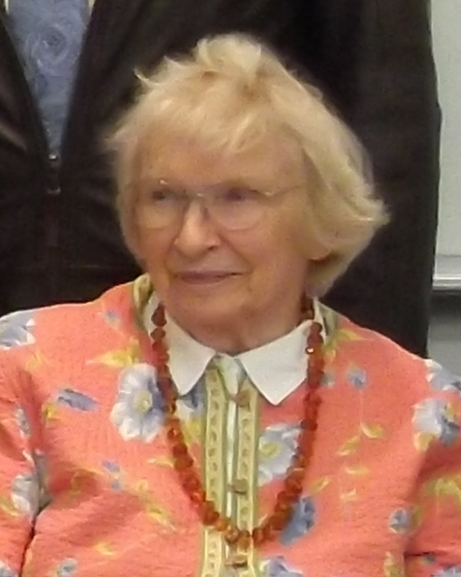
- Sturgulewski in 2013

Member of the Alaska Senate
- In office 1979–1993
- Preceded by: Joseph L. Orsini (District H) W E Brad Bradley (District F-A)
- Succeeded by: Rick Halford (District H); Drue Pearce (District F-A)
- Constituency: District H (1979–1983); District F-A (1983–1993)

Personal details
- Born: Jane Arliss Wright; September 27, 1927 Blaine, Washington, U.S.
- Died: April 7, 2022 (aged 94) Anchorage, Alaska, U.S.
- Party: Republican (until 2016); Independent (from 2016)
- Education: University of Washington, Seattle (BA)

Jane Arliss Sturgulewski (née Wright; September 27, 1927 – April 7, 2022) was an American businesswoman and Republican politician from the U.S. state of Alaska. In a political career in which she started appearing in the spotlight in 1975, she represented Anchorage in the Alaska Senate from 1979 to 1993. Twice during off-years in re-election to her four-year Senate term (in 1986 and 1990), she won the Republican nomination for governor of Alaska against mostly conservative opposition in blanket primaries. The second time, in 1990, she came out in third place behind Walter Hickel and runner up Tony Knowles, which was the second of three times in Alaska's history a major-party nominee placed third. She won a 2000 Anchorage Athena award.

== Life ==
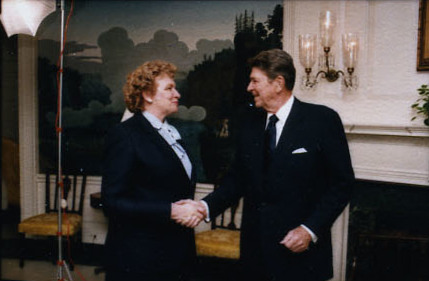
Sturgulewski greeting President Ronald Reagan in 1986

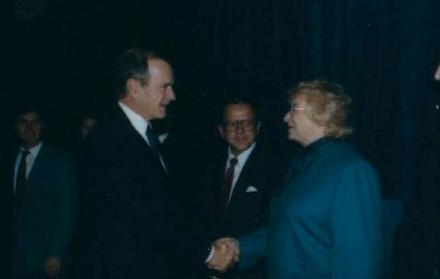
Sturgulewski greeting President George H. W. Bush in 1990

Arliss Sturgulewski received a BA in Economics and Business from the University of Washington and was awarded an Honorary Doctor of Laws degree from University of Alaska Anchorage in 1993.

Arliss served on many municipal boards. She was elected to the Anchorage Charter Commission, the Anchorage Assembly, and to the Alaska State Senate from 1979 through 1993. Sturgulewski originally ran for an open Senate seat in 1978 when one-term Republican incumbent Joseph Orsini, an engineering professor at the University of Alaska Anchorage, did not seek re-election. Sturgulewski defeated Democratic nominee Bruce Kendall, who had defected to the Democrats since leaving the legislature over a decade prior. Mostly easily re-elected ever since, she chose not to stand for re-election in 1992.

In 1986 and 1990, she won the Republican primary for governor. In 1986, her campaign used the slogan "Let's Just Call Her Governor", owing to her hard-to-read surname. In the election, she lost to Democrat Steve Cowper 47.3-42.6. In 1990, her running mate Jack Coghill defected to the third party candidate Walter J. Hickel. Sturgulewski went on to come in third place behind former governor Wally Hickel and Democrat Tony Knowles. There was opposition within the Republican party to her abortion rights and development positions. By 2016, she had registered nonpartisan, as the Republican party had moved, "too far to the right." In 2019, Sturgulewski co-chaired a committee that attempted to recall Republican Governor Mike Dunleavy.

She was a trustee for the University of Alaska Foundation, and served on the Advisory Council for the University of Alaska, School of Fisheries and Ocean Sciences, in addition to numerous other statewide boards and commissions.

Her papers are held at University of Alaska Anchorage.

Her husband, Bernard Sturgulewski, died in a plane crash in 1968. Their only child, Bernard Jr. (nicknamed "Roe") is married to Carol Murkowski, the oldest of the six children of Nancy and Frank Murkowski (and the older sister of U.S. Senator Lisa Murkowski).

Sturgulewski died on April 7, 2022.

Alaska Senate
Preceded by Joseph L. Orsini	Member of the Alaska Senate from District H 1979–1983	Succeeded by Rick Halford
Preceded by W E Brad Bradley	Member of the Alaska Senate from District F-A; 1983–1993	Succeeded by Drue Pearce
Party political offices
Preceded by Tom Fink	Republican nominee for Governor of Alaska; 1986, 1990	Succeeded by Jim Campbell
