= Bill Sheffield =

American Democratic politician (1928–2022)

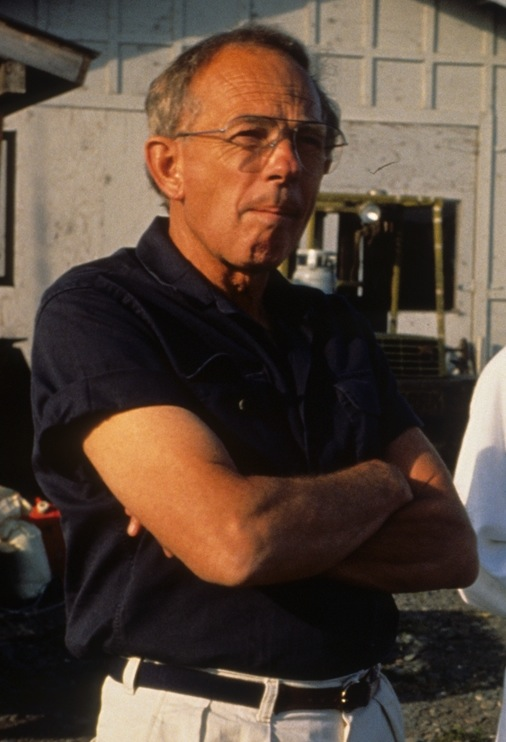
- Sheffield on vacation in Homer, Alaska, July 1989

5th Governor of Alaska
- In office December 6, 1982 – December 1, 1986
- Lieutenant: Steve McAlpine
- Preceded by: Jay Hammond
- Succeeded by: Steve Cowper

3rd CEO and President of the Alaska Railroad
- In office 1997–2001
- Preceded by: Robert Hatfield Jr.
- Succeeded by: Patrick K. Gamble

Personal details
- Born: William Jennings Sheffield Jr. June 26, 1928 Spokane, Washington, U.S.
- Died: November 4, 2022 (aged 94) Anchorage, Alaska, U.S.
- Party: Democratic
- Education: DeVry University

Military service
- Allegiance: United States
- Branch/service: United States Army
- Years of service: 1946-1949

William Jennings Sheffield Jr. (June 26, 1928 – November 4, 2022) was an American Democratic politician who was the fifth governor of Alaska from 1982 to 1986. Sheffield's term in the governor's mansion was marked by controversy including attempts to have him impeached.

== Background ==
Sheffield was born in Spokane, Washington. He served in the United States Army from 1946 to 1949 and went to DeForest Training School in Lisle, Illinois west of Chicago, which has changed its name to DeVry University. Sheffield moved to Alaska in 1953 to sell and service home appliances for Sears. He arrived by steamship in Seward, Alaska and took a train to Anchorage. He joined the local chamber of commerce group; his participation enabled him to overcome a severe stutter. Sheffield later founded a hospitality business, Sheffield Enterprises which expanded to own and operate 19 Sheffield House hotels across Alaska and in Whitehorse, Yukon. He sold the business to Holland America Line in 1987.

In addition to his business career, Sheffield was involved in politics and government as a Democrat, and was a delegate to numerous local, state, and national party conventions. He served on the Anchorage Planning Commission from 1960 to 1963, and the Anchorage Charter Commission in 1976. In addition, he was the chair of the state parole board and the University of Alaska Foundation Board. He died at his Anchorage home on November 4, 2022. He was 94.

== Governorship ==
While governor, Sheffield pushed an unpopular bill through the Alaska state legislature to consolidate the state's time zones. Prior to the passage of the bill, Alaska was spread over four time zones (Pacific, Yukon, Alaska-Hawaii, and Bering). Sheffield's bill placed virtually the entire state (with the sole exception of the Aleutians, starting just west of Dutch Harbor) into the Yukon Time Zone (which was then renamed the Alaska Time Zone). Initially, this was poorly received; those in the panhandle lost their sense of unity with the west coast of the U.S., and those in the heartland of the state were placed, in effect, in a perpetual daylight saving time. More than 20 years later, the state legislature was still debating the issue, with some members wanting to return the panhandle and capital to Seattle time. Others claimed that Sheffield broke his promise to revisit the change after a one-year trial period.

=== Impeachment inquiry ===
As governor, Sheffield was brought before a grand jury investigating a contract which had been awarded by the state amid allegations of favoritism and lack of due process in the awarding process. He was not indicted. The grand jury report urged the impeachment of Sheffield. The report was leaked to the public after an anonymous source alerted the members of the news media that a waste receptacle in the court building in which grand jury deliberations had been held contained a copy of the report. After the report was leaked, deliberations about an impeachment began. An impeachment inquiry was conducted to determine whether the Alaska Senate would impeach. An impeachment would have led to an impeachment trial in the Alaska House of Representatives. By a 3–2 vote, the committee running the inquiry into Sheffield voted to send the Senate a report concluding that there was insufficient evidence against Sheffield to warrant an impeachment. Instead of impeachment, the Senate opted to pass a resolution condemning Sheffield's gubernatorial administration for favoritism.

== Later career ==
After leaving the position of governor, Sheffield served as chairman of the board of directors for the Alaska Railroad from 1985 to 1997. In 1997, he was promoted to president and CEO of the railroad, where he served until 2001. By 2008, he was vice chairman of the railroad's Board of Directors.

Party political offices
| Preceded by Chancy Croft | Democratic nominee for Governor of Alaska; 1982 | Succeeded by Steve Cowper |
Political offices
| Preceded by Jay Hammond | Governor of Alaska; 1982–1986 | Succeeded by Steve Cowper |
Business positions
| Preceded by Robert Hatfield | President of the Alaska Railroad; 1997–2001 | Succeeded by Patrick K. Gamble |
