= Lieutenant Governor of Alaska =

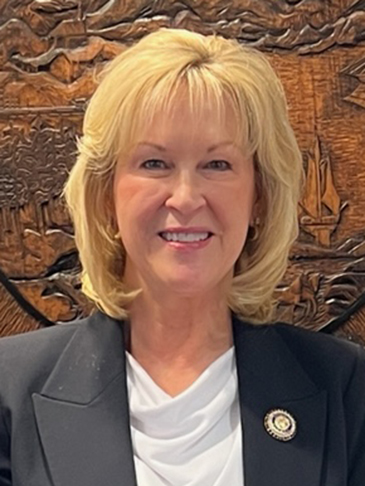
Nancy Dahlstrom, current lieutenant governor of Alaska.

The lieutenant governor of Alaska is the deputy elected official to the governor of the U.S. state of Alaska. Unlike most lieutenant governors in the U.S., the office also maintains the duties of a secretary of state, and indeed was named such until August 25, 1970. Prior to statehood, the territorial-era Secretary of Alaska, who was appointed by the president of the United States like the governor, functioned as an acting governor or successor-in-waiting. Currently, the lieutenant governor accedes to the governorship in case of a vacancy. The lieutenant governor runs together with the governor in both the primary and the general election as a slate. The current lieutenant governor is Nancy Dahlstrom, who took office on 5 December 2022.

== List ==
Lieutenant governors of the State of Alaska
No.	Lieutenant Governor (Note: The office of lieutenant governor was named secretary of state until 1970.)	Term in office	Party	Election	Governor (Note: Lieutenant governors represented the same party as their governor unless noted.)
1	Hugh Wade (1901–1995)	January 3, 1959 – December 5, 1966 (lost election)	Democratic	1958	William A. Egan
1	Hugh Wade (1901–1995)	January 3, 1959 – December 5, 1966 (lost election)	Democratic	1962	William A. Egan
2	Keith Harvey Miller (1925–2019)	December 5, 1966 – January 29, 1969 (succeeded to governor)	Republican	1966	Wally Hickel
3	Robert W. Ward (1929–1997)	January 29, 1969 – December 7, 1970 (lost election)	Republican	Succeeded from commissioner of administration	Keith Harvey Miller
4	H. A. Boucher (1921–2009)	December 7, 1970 – December 2, 1974 (lost election)	Democratic	1970	William A. Egan
5	Lowell Thomas Jr. (1923–2016)	December 2, 1974 – December 4, 1978 (did not run)	Republican	1974	Jay Hammond
6	Terry Miller (1942–1989)	December 4, 1978 – December 6, 1982 (did not run) (Note: Miller instead ran unsuccessfully for the Republican nomination for governor.)	Republican	1978	Jay Hammond
7	Steve McAlpine (b. 1949)	December 6, 1982 – December 3, 1990 (did not run) (Note: McAlpine instead ran unsuccessfully for the Democratic nomination for governor.)	Democratic	1982	Bill Sheffield
7	Steve McAlpine (b. 1949)	December 6, 1982 – December 3, 1990 (did not run)	Democratic	1986	Steve Cowper
8	Jack Coghill (1925–2019)	December 3, 1990 – December 5, 1994 (did not run) (Note: Coghill instead ran unsuccessfully for governor.)	Alaskan; Independence	1990	Wally Hickel
9	Fran Ulmer (b. 1947)	December 5, 1994 – December 2, 2002 (did not run) (Note: Ulmer instead ran unsuccessfully for governor.)	Democratic	1994	Tony Knowles
9	Fran Ulmer (b. 1947)	December 5, 1994 – December 2, 2002 (did not run)	Democratic	1998	Tony Knowles
10	Loren Leman (b. 1950)	December 2, 2002 – December 4, 2006 (did not run)	Republican	2002	Frank Murkowski
11	Sean Parnell (b. 1962)	December 4, 2006 – July 26, 2009 (succeeded to governor)	Republican	2006	Sarah Palin
—	Office vacant from July 26 – August 10, 2009		Office vacated by succession to governor (Note: Parnell succeeded to the governorship upon Palin's resignation. Joe Schmidt, commissioner of the Department of Corrections and Palin's designated replacement for Parnell, refused the position. Campbell was appointed as "Temporary Substitute Lieutenant Governor" on July 26, 2009, and was confirmed by the Alaska Legislature on August 10, 2009.)		Sean Parnell
12	Craig Campbell (b. 1952)	August 10, 2009 – December 6, 2010 (did not run)	Republican	Nominated by governor and confirmed by legislature	Sean Parnell
13	Mead Treadwell (b. 1956)	December 6, 2010 – December 1, 2014 (did not run) (Note: Treadwell instead ran unsuccessfully for the Republican nomination for the United States Senate.)	Republican	2010	Sean Parnell
14	Byron Mallott (1943–2020)	December 1, 2014 – October 16, 2018 (resigned) (Note: Mallott resigned, citing inappropriate comments he had made to a woman; Davidson, Commissioner of the Alaska Department of Health and Social Services, was appointed to succeed him.)	Democratic (Note: Mallott was elected as an independent on a "unity ticket" with independent governor Bill Walker, but some sources continued to refer to him as a Democrat.)	2014	Bill Walker
15	Valerie Davidson (b. 1967)	October 16, 2018 – December 3, 2018 (withdrew) (Note: Davidson was appointed on October 16, 2018, after the ballot certification deadline of September 4, and so Mallott remained on the ballot. Governor Walker withdrew on October 19.)	Democratic	Appointed by governor	Bill Walker
16	Kevin Meyer (b. 1956)	December 3, 2018 – December 5, 2022 (did not run)	Republican	2018	Mike Dunleavy
17	Nancy Dahlstrom (b. 1957)	December 5, 2022 – Incumbent (Note: Dahlstrom's term expires on December 7, 2026.)	Republican	2022	Mike Dunleavy

== See also ==
- List of Alaska State Legislatures
