= Alaska Republican Party =

Alaska affiliate of the Republican Party

- Chairperson: Carmela Warfield
- Governor: Mike Dunleavy
- Lieutenant Governor: Nancy Dahlstrom
- Senate President: Gary Stevens
- Membership (2024): ▲144,363
- Ideology: Conservatism
- National affiliation: Republican Party
- Colors: Red
- Statewide Executive Offices: 2 / 2
- Alaska Senate: 6 / 20 (Note: 5 Republicans form a grand coalition with 9 Democrats. 6 Republicans are non-caucusing.)
- Alaska House of Representatives: 19 / 40 (Note: 19 Republicans form a Minority Caucus, and 2 Republicans are part of the Democratic Majority caucus.)
- U.S. Senate (Alaskan seats): 2 / 2
- U.S. House of Representatives (Alaskan seat): 1 / 1

Website
- alaskagop.net

The Alaska Republican Party is the affiliate of the Republican Party in Alaska, headquartered in Anchorage.

It is currently the favored party in the state, controlling both of Alaska's U.S. Senate seats and the governorship. Republican presidential nominees have won Alaska in recent elections; the last and only Democrat to carry Alaska was Lyndon B. Johnson in 1964.

== History ==
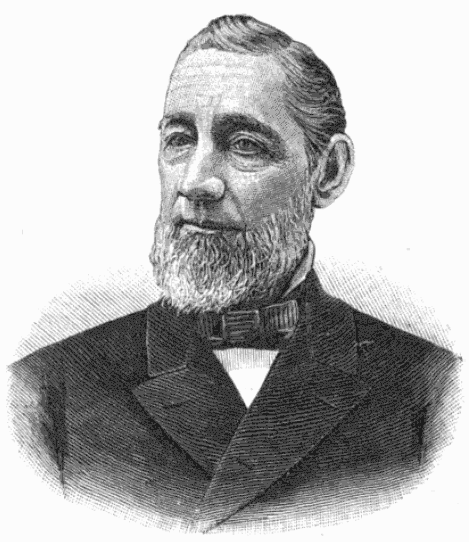
John Henry Kinkead was the first Governor of the District of Alaska (1884 to 1885).

The Alaska Republican Party originates from Alaska's first district governor. Once Alaska was granted the status of United States District civilian leadership could be appointed by the current president of the United States. President Chester A. Arthur appointed Alaska's first territorial governor. He was a Republican named John Henry Kinkead.

Martha Ried of Petersberg was the Chair of the Republican Party of Alaska.

Alaska Republicans as a party organization can trace their origin to Alaska's first legislature in 1913.

After Republican Senator Lisa Murkowski voted to convict Donald Trump in his second impeachment trial over his role in inciting a pro-Trump mob to attack the U.S. Capitol, the Alaska Republican Party censured her, called for her resignation, and endorsed challenger Kelly Tshibaka against her in the Republican primary in 2022.

== Organization ==
State party leader	Position	City
Carmela Warfield	Chairman	Anchorage
Jason Perry	Vice Chair	Anchorage
Brian Hove	National Committeeman	Anchorage, Alaska
Cynthia Henry	National Committeewoman	Fairbanks
Trevor Shaw	Secretary	Ketchikan
Kevin Fimon	Treasurer	Anchorage

== Current elected officials ==
=== Members of Congress ===
==== U.S. Senate ====
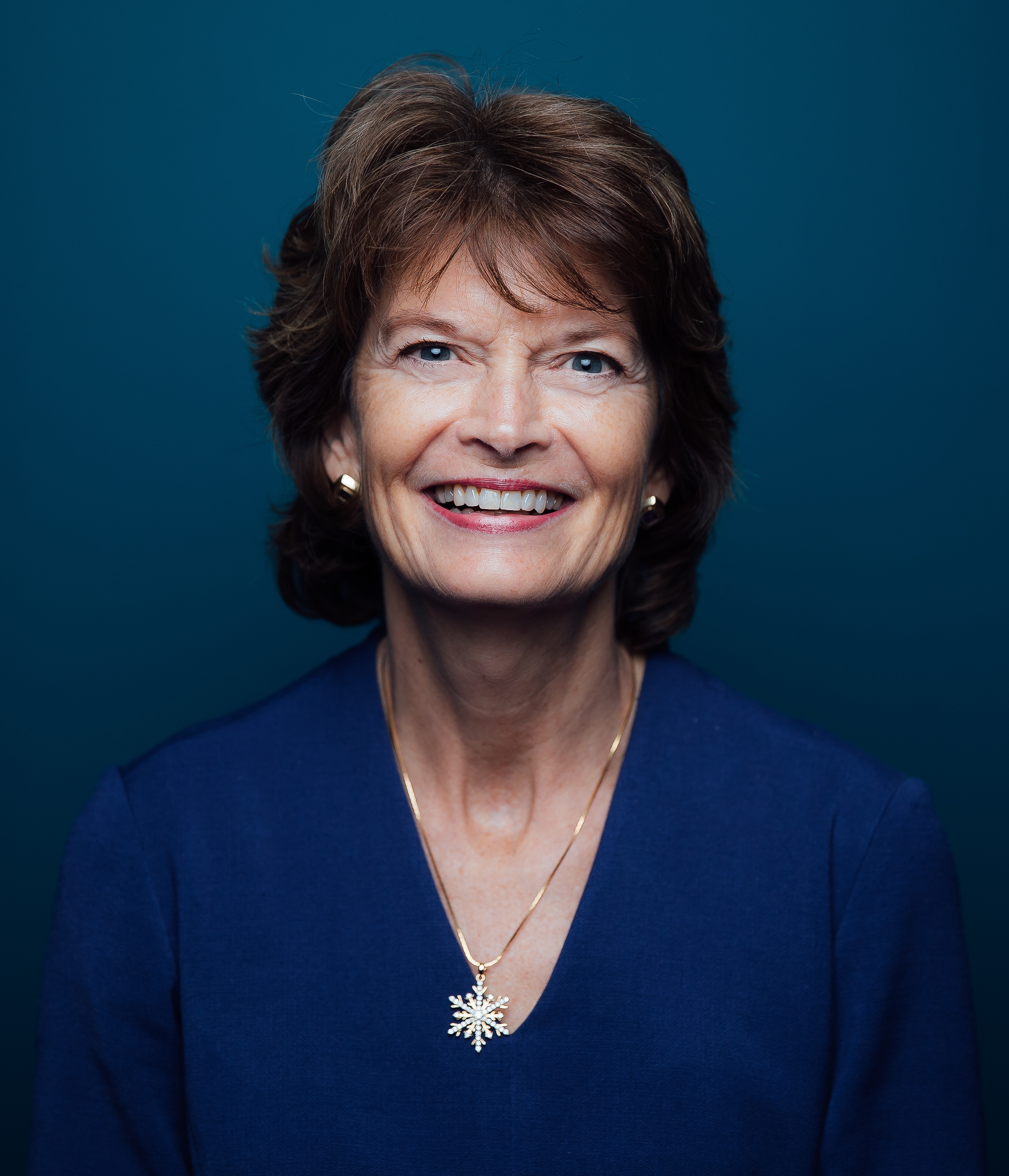
Senior U.S. Senator Lisa Murkowski

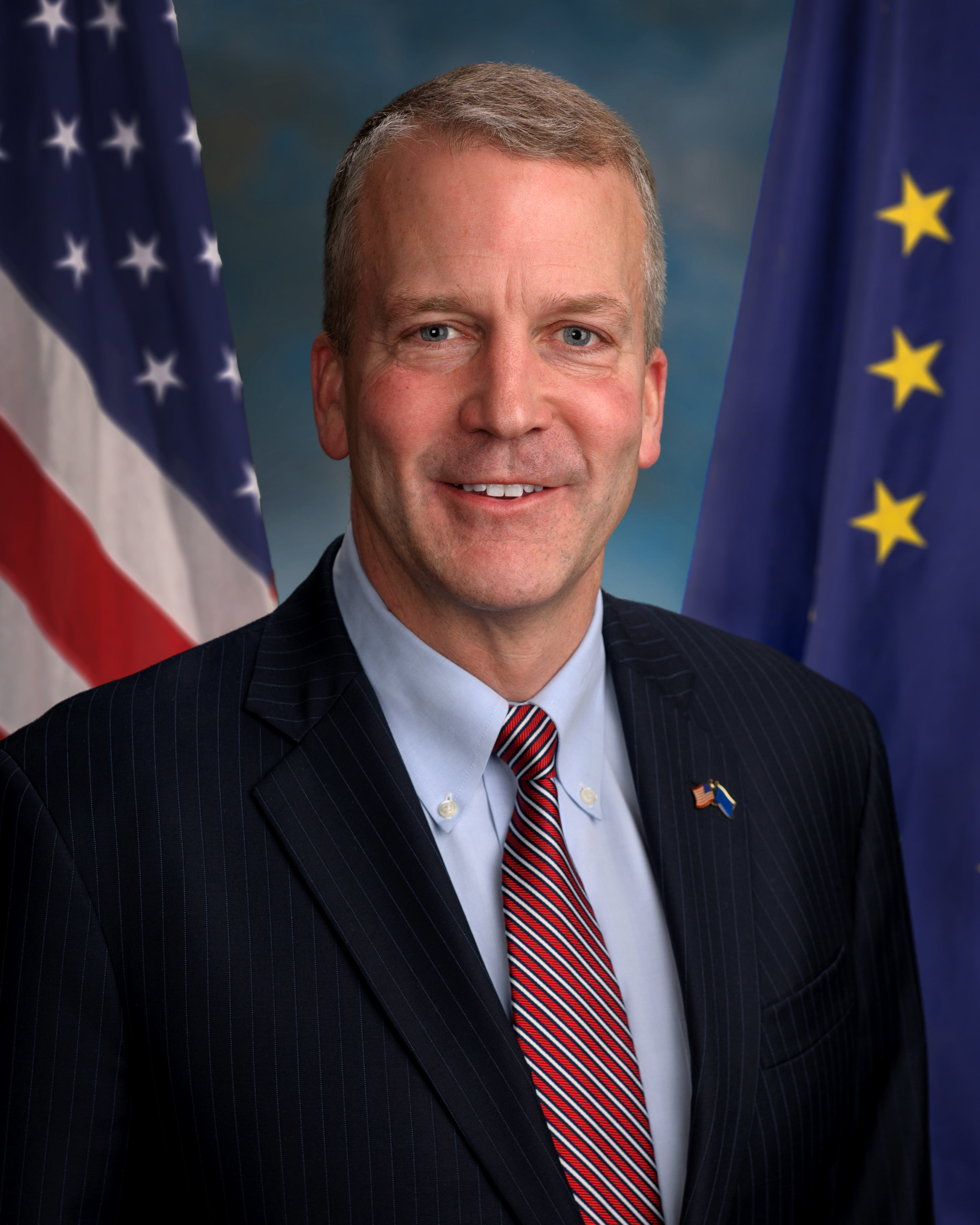
Junior U.S. Senator Dan Sullivan

==== U.S. House of Representatives ====
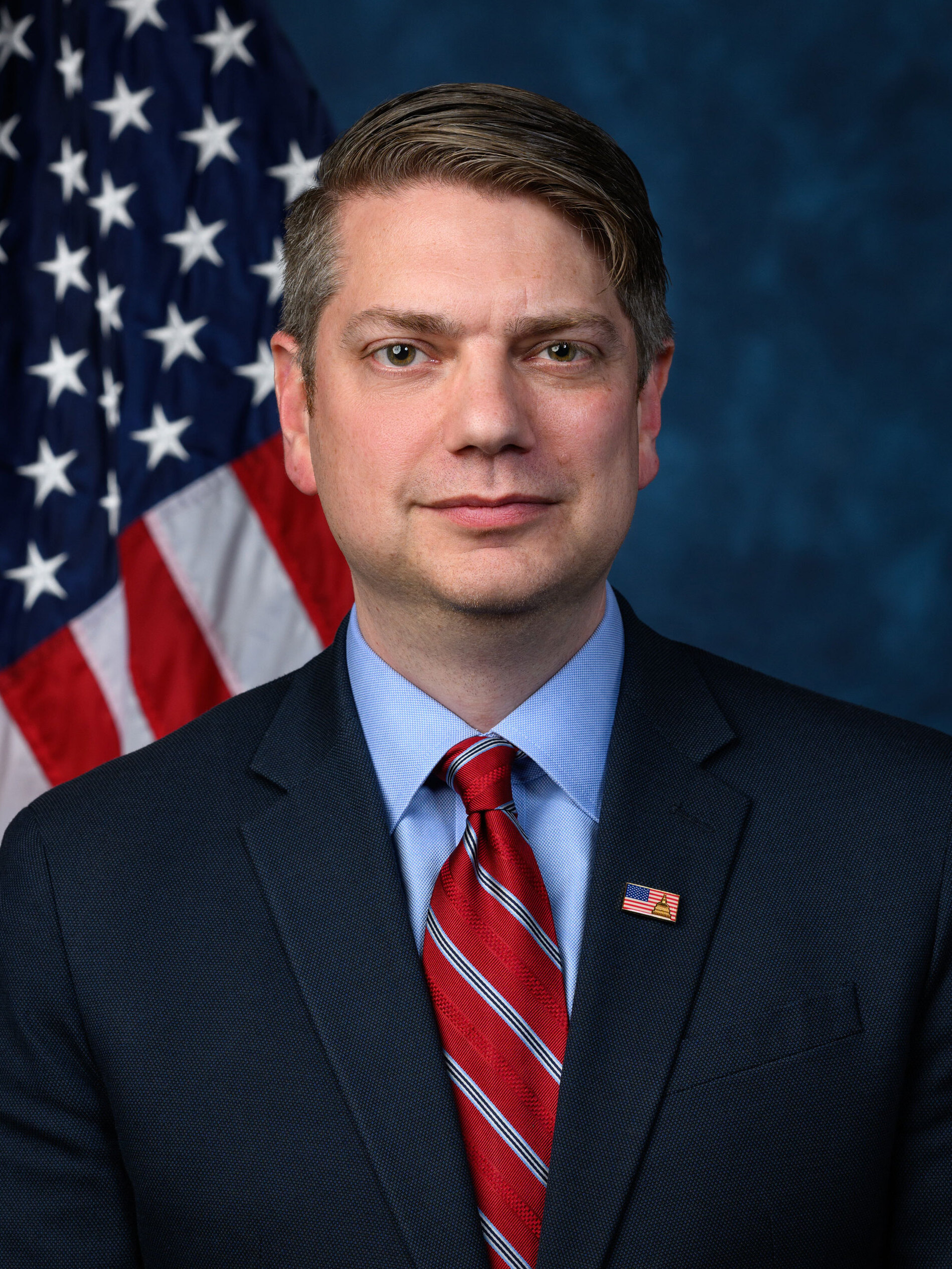
Representative Nick Begich III (Alaska at-large)

== Results ==
=== Presidential ===
Alaska Republican Party presidential election results
Election	Presidential Ticket	Votes	Vote %	Electoral votes	Result
1960	Richard Nixon/Henry Cabot Lodge Jr.	30,953	50.94%	3 / 3	Lost
1964	Barry Goldwater/William E. Miller	22,930	34.09%	0 / 3	Lost
1968	Richard Nixon/Spiro Agnew	37,600	45.28%	3 / 3	Won
1972	Richard Nixon/Spiro Agnew	55,349	58.10%	3 / 3	Won
1976	Gerald Ford/Bob Dole	71,555	57.90%	3 / 3	Lost
1980	Ronald Reagan/George H. W. Bush	86,112	54.35%	3 / 3	Won
1984	Ronald Reagan/George H. W. Bush	138,377	66.65%	3 / 3	Won
1988	George H. W. Bush/Dan Quayle	119,251	59.59%	3 / 3	Won
1992	George H. W. Bush/Dan Quayle	102,000	39.46%	3 / 3	Lost
1996	Bob Dole/Jack Kemp	122,746	50.80%	3 / 3	Lost
2000	George W. Bush/Dick Cheney	167,398	58.62%	3 / 3	Won
2004	George W. Bush/Dick Cheney	190,889	61.07%	3 / 3	Won
2008	John McCain/Sarah Palin	193,841	59.42%	3 / 3	Lost
2012	Mitt Romney/Paul Ryan	164,676	54.80%	3 / 3	Lost
2016	Donald Trump/Mike Pence	163,387	51.28%	3 / 3	Won
2020	Donald Trump/Mike Pence	189,951	52.83%	3 / 3	Lost
2024	Donald Trump/JD Vance	184,458	54.54%	3 / 3	Won

=== Gubernatorial ===
Alaska Republican Party gubernatorial election results
Election	Gubernatorial Ticket	Votes	Vote %	Result
1958	John Butrovich/K. F. Dewey	19,299	39.41%	Lost ✗
1962	Mike Stepovich/Ross	27,054	47.73%	Lost ✗
1966	Wally Hickel/Keith H. Miller	33,145	49.99%	Won ✓
1970	Keith H. Miller/Robert W. Ward	37,264	46.13%	Lost ✗
1974	Jay Hammond/Lowell Thomas Jr.	45,840	47.67%	Won ✓
1978	Jay Hammond/Terry Miller	49,580	39.07%	Won ✓
1982	Tom Fink/Mike Colletta	72,291	37.09%	Lost ✗
1986	Arliss Sturgulewski/Terry Miller	76,515	42.61%	Lost ✗
1990	Arliss Sturgulewski/Jim Campbell	50,991	26.18%	Lost ✗
1994	Jim Campbell/Mike W. Miller	87,157	40.84%	Lost ✗
1998	John Howard Lindauer	39,331	17.86%	Lost ✗
2002	Frank Murkowski/Loren Leman	129,279	55.85%	Won ✓
2006	Sarah Palin/Sean Parnell	114,697	48.33%	Won ✓
2010	Sean Parnell/Mead Treadwell	151,318	59.06%	Won ✓
2014	Sean Parnell/Dan Sullivan	128,435	45.88%	Lost ✗
2018	Mike Dunleavy/Kevin Meyer	145,631	51.44%	Won ✓
2022	Mike Dunleavy/Nancy Dahlstrom	132,632	50.29%	Won ✓

== See also ==
- Alaska Democratic Party
- Political party strength in Alaska
