= Robert W. Ward =

American businessman and politician from Alaska

- Ward in 1970

1st Lieutenant Governor of Alaska
- In office August 25, 1970 – December 7, 1970
- Governor: Keith Harvey Miller
- Preceded by: Position established
- Succeeded by: H. A. Boucher

Secretary of State of Alaska
- In office January 29, 1969 – August 25, 1970
- Governor: Keith Harvey Miller
- Preceded by: Keith Harvey Miller
- Succeeded by: Position abolished

Personal details
- Born: Robert Walter Ward; November 26, 1929; Addy, Washington, U.S.
- Died: April 3, 1997 (aged 67); Seattle, Washington, U.S.
- Political party: Republican

Robert Walter Ward (November 26, 1929 – April 3, 1997) was an American electrician, businessman, and government executive, and Republican politician from the U.S. state of Alaska. He was the third Secretary of State of Alaska from 1969 to 1970, and was the last person to serve under that title, as the title was changed to lieutenant governor by a constitutional amendment passed by voters on August 25, 1970, making him the first lieutenant governor of Alaska.

== Life and career ==
Robert Ward was born in Addy, Washington, to Floyd and Eunice Ward, and grew up in northeastern Washington. He moved to Ketchikan, Alaska, in 1954 to work as an electrician at the Ketchikan Pulp Company, who had opened a pulp mill in the community that same year. Ward remained with Ketchikan Pulp until 1966, becoming head of the electrical department.

Ward began his political career when he was elected to the Ketchikan city council in 1961. He later became the first chairman of the Ketchikan Gateway Borough when it was established in late 1963.

Newly elected Governor Walter Hickel appointed Ward as Alaska commissioner of administration in late 1966. It was in this position that he became the Secretary of State. One of the responsibilities of Alaska's governor is to craft an order of succession from amongst the cabinet officers. When Hickel resigned to become the U.S. Secretary of the Interior, Keith Miller, the elected Secretary of State, became governor. Ward, as the next in line, became Secretary of State.

Ward, running along with Miller for a full term, were defeated by the slate of Bill Egan and Red Boucher in the 1970 election. He later made another unsuccessful attempt at regaining the position, and was also an unsuccessful candidate for mayor of Juneau in 1988, which was won by Bruce Botelho.

His later service in government included stints as head of the Alaska Power Administration, a federal agency, and as a member of the first board of directors of the Alaska Permanent Fund Corporation.

Ward was appointed commissioner of the Alaska Department of Transportation and Public Facilities by Governor Jay Hammond on October 24, 1978. The department had been created the previous year by Hammond by merging the Departments of Highways and Public Works.

Ward left state service in 1982, and worked as a lobbyist in Juneau. He was diagnosed with leukemia in January 1996. His last public act was serving as a presidential elector in the 1996 election. He interrupted the treatment he was undergoing in Seattle for his leukemia in order to participate in the balloting. He died on April 3, 1997, in Seattle, where he was still undergoing treatment.

== Personal life ==
Robert Ward married Peggie Garske of Ione, Washington, in 1949. They divorced in 1973. They had three children: Kenneth, Robert Jr. and Karen. He married Beverly Ann Wilson on June 26, 1976, and remained with her until his death.

Kenneth Ward established a commuter airline, Ward Air. Robert Ward, Jr. was a candidate for a Ketchikan-area seat in the Alaska House of Representatives in the 1980s, and is currently the city manager of Skagway, Alaska.

Party political offices
Preceded by Keith Harvey Miller	Republican nominee for Lieutenant Governor of Alaska; 1970	Succeeded by Lowell Thomas Jr.
Political offices
Preceded by Position established	Lieutenant Governor of Alaska; 1970	Succeeded by H. A. Boucher
