= Commonwealth North =

U.S. nonprofit organization

Commonwealth North is a nonprofit, nonpartisan educational organization based in Anchorage, Alaska. Founded in 1979, it is the oldest and largest public affairs forum in Alaska. Membership is open to everyone.

It has more than 350 members and annually hosts more than 25 events on political, cultural, social and economic topics. Proceedings of events including transcripts, audiotapes and PowerPoint presentations are frequently made available on the organization's Web site.

In addition to hosting events and panels, Commonwealth North produces annual study reports and policy reports. The study reports address key issues confronting the state and are intended to assist in their resolution. Some issues are particular to the state, others are of broader regional, national and international interest.

== History ==
Commonwealth North was founded in 1979 by former Alaskan Governors Walter J. Hickel and the late William A. Egan. Its mission is the nonpartisan study of public affairs. Its bylaws are based on those of the oldest such public affairs forum in the United States, the Commonwealth Club of California.

The organization has hosted numerous world-class speakers including many former United U.S. senators and other major political leaders in the USA and abroad, as well as business leaders and other prominent figures in public and private life. Speakers receive no honoraria.

The organization has an office in Anchorage and the majority of its programs are in Anchorage.

== Speakers ==
The list of notable speakers and speeches numbers in the hundreds and includes domestic and foreign political and military leaders, Nobel Prize-winning scientists, authors, activists, and more.

The purpose of the speakers forum is to afford members a wide range of differing viewpoints that expand Alaskans' perspectives on national and global issues. At the same time, Commonwealth North provides visiting dignitaries an understanding of Alaska: its rich culture, history, resources, values, and potential.

In lieu of honoraria, Commonwealth North provides guest speakers with a first-hand view of Alaska to explore the Prudhoe Bay oil fields in the Arctic and along the 800-mile trans-Alaska pipeline; fish for halibut or salmon; and view Alaska's wilderness, glaciers, rivers, mountains, and wildlife.

Domestic political speakers have included U.S. Senators Lisa Murkowski. Frank Murkowski and Ted Stevens; U.S. Secretary of Transportation Norman Mineta; the Attorney General for the State of Alaska, David W. Márquez; and the Governor of the Federal Reserve Board, Dr. Edward Gramlich. International political speakers have included the President of Iceland, Dr. Olafur Ragnar Grimsson; Former Prime Minister of New Zealand James Bolger; and the British Columbia Premier, The Hon. Dan Miller. Other recent speakers include Dr. Vernon L. Smith, 2002 Nobel Laureate for Economics, and Robert William Fogel, 1993 Nobel Laureate for Economics.

== Research projects and studies ==
A number of issues have been studied by Commonwealth North leaders, member committees, or scholars commissioned by Commonwealth North. The issue of the year is decided by the Board of Directors. Among the topics studied have been energy, developing health care and education, rural Alaska and the management of wildlife and land.

The 2007 report, "At A Crossroad: The Permanent Fund, Alaskans, and Alaska's Future", based on a nine-month study, contains suggestions on management and governance of the Alaska Permanent Fund. Other reports have looked at issues including work force development, the relationship between the state and Alaska's North Slope oil producers, and bringing the North Slope gas to market.
