= Hugh Wade =

American politician

Secretary of State of Alaska
- In office January 3, 1959 – December 5, 1966
- Governor: William A. Egan
- Preceded by: Waino E. Hendrickson as Secretary of Alaska Territory
- Succeeded by: Keith H. Miller

Personal details
- Born: June 29, 1901; Dougherty, Iowa, U.S.
- Died: March 25, 1995 (aged 93); Juneau, Alaska, U.S.
- Political party: Democratic
- Spouse: Madge Case
- Relatives: Martin Wade (uncle)

Hugh Joseph Wade (June 29, 1901 – March 25, 1995) was an American Democratic politician who served as the first secretary of state of Alaska, serving from January 3, 1959, until December 5, 1966.

Wade ran for governor in 1958, dropping out after Bill Egan announced his run. He then ran for Secretary of State (equivalent today to lieutenant governor), and won the Democratic nomination in a close contest against Dick Greuel. The ticket of Egan/Wade won the 1958 general election, defeating the Republican ticket of John Butrovich and K.F. Dewey.

In 1959, due to the illness of Governor Bill Egan, Wade, as Secretary of State, served as acting governor of Alaska.

He was previously the territorial treasurer, serving from 1954 to January 1, 1959.

Party political offices
| First | Democratic nominee for Secretary of State of Alaska; 1958, 1962, 1966 | Succeeded by H. A. Boucher |
