= 1974 Alaska gubernatorial election =

- November 5, 1974
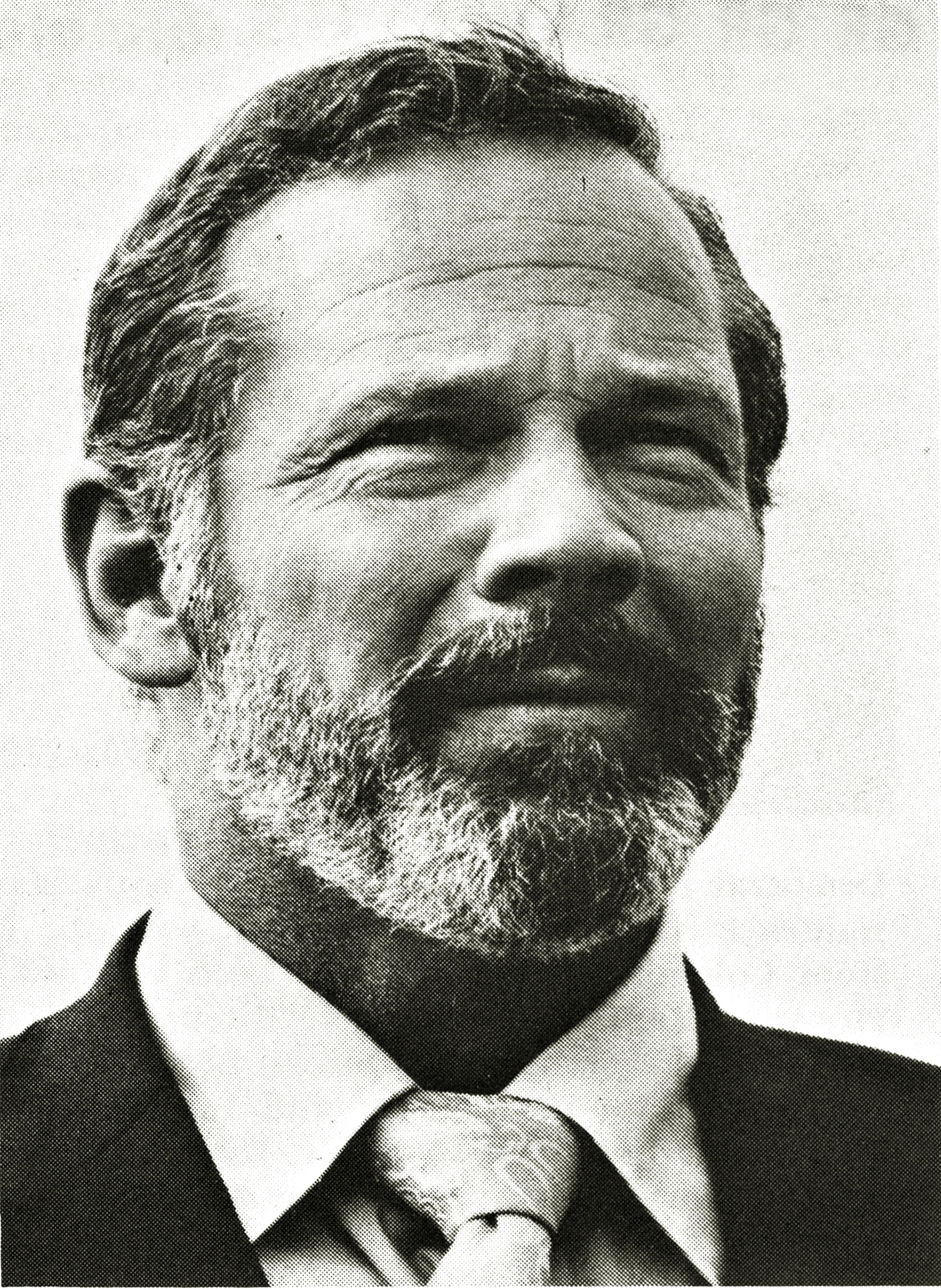

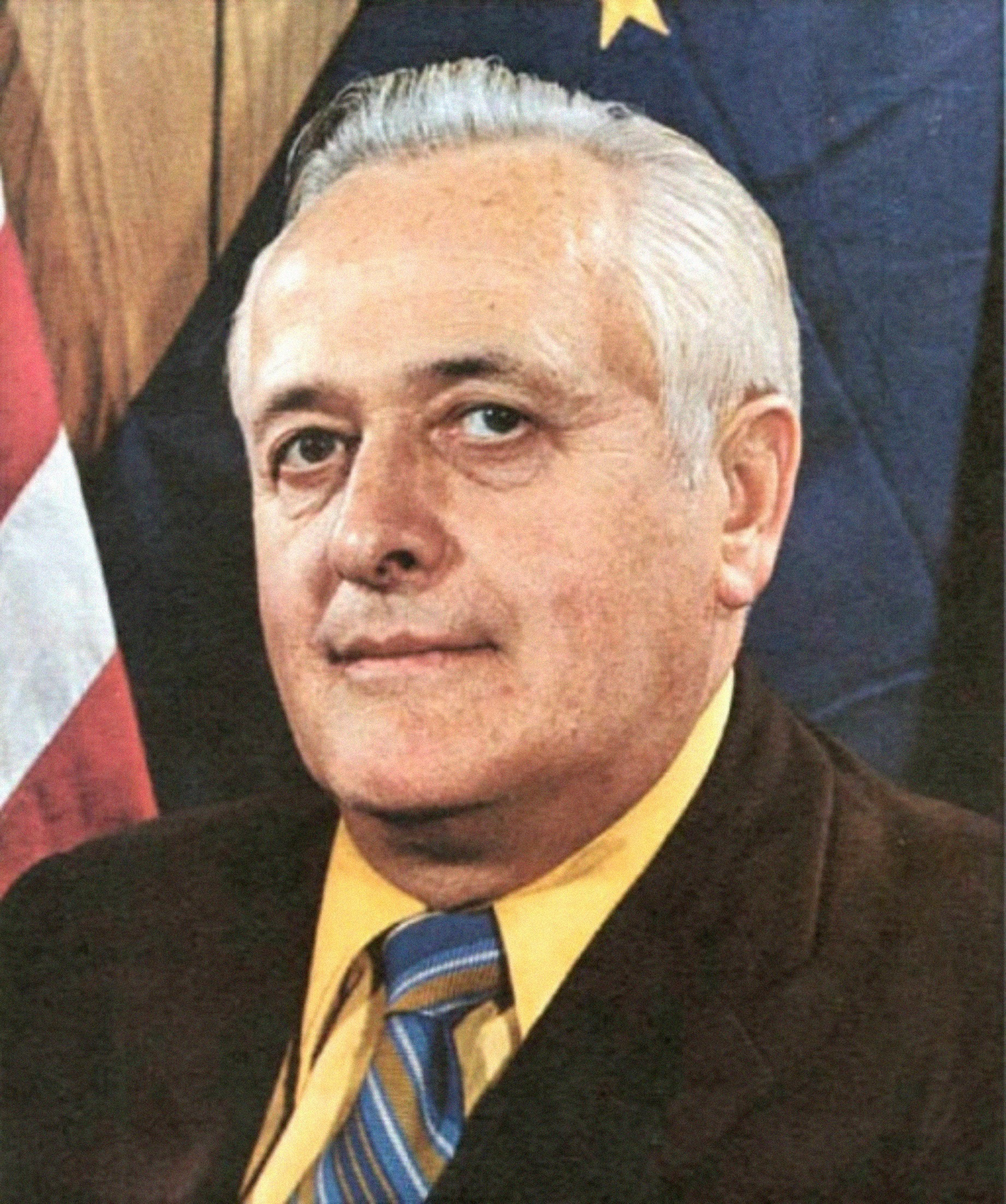
Nominee	Jay Hammond	Bill Egan
Party	Republican	Democratic
Running mate	Lowell Thomas Jr.	Red Boucher
Popular vote	45,840	45,553
Percentage	47.67%	47.37%
- Results by state house district Hammond: 40–50% 50–60% 60–70% Egan: 50–60% 60–70%
Governor before election
Bill Egan
Democratic
Elected Governor
Jay Hammond
Republican

The 1974 Alaska gubernatorial election took place on November 5, 1974, for the post of governor of Alaska. Republican challenger and mayor of Bristol Bay Borough Jay Hammond narrowly beat Democratic incumbent Bill Egan in a close race that was forced into a recount to verify the results. The formation of the new Alaskan Independence Party was considered to have a large impact on the race. Hammond had defeated former governors Wally Hickel and Keith Harvey Miller for the Republican nomination, while Egan defeated Eben Hopson and Don Wright for the Democratic nomination.

== Results ==
Open primary result
Party	Candidate	Votes	%
Republican	Jay Hammond	28,602	34.47%
Republican	Wally Hickel	20,728	24.98%
Democratic	Bill Egan (inc.)	20,356	24.53%
Republican	Keith Harvey Miller	10,864	13.09%
Democratic	Don Wright	1,063	1.28%
Democratic	Eben Hopson	951	1.15%
Republican	Donn Hopkins	269	0.32%
Republican	James R. Russell	144	0.17%
Total votes		82,977	100.0%
Turnout		84,585	

1974 Alaska gubernatorial election
Party	Candidate	Votes	%	±%
Republican	Jay Hammond	45,840	47.67%	+1.54%
Democratic	Bill Egan (inc.)	45,553	47.37%	−5.01%
Independence	Joe Vogler	4,770	4.96%	
Majority		287	0.30%	
Turnout		96,163		
Republican gain from Democratic		Swing		
