= 1970 Alaska gubernatorial election =

- November 3, 1970
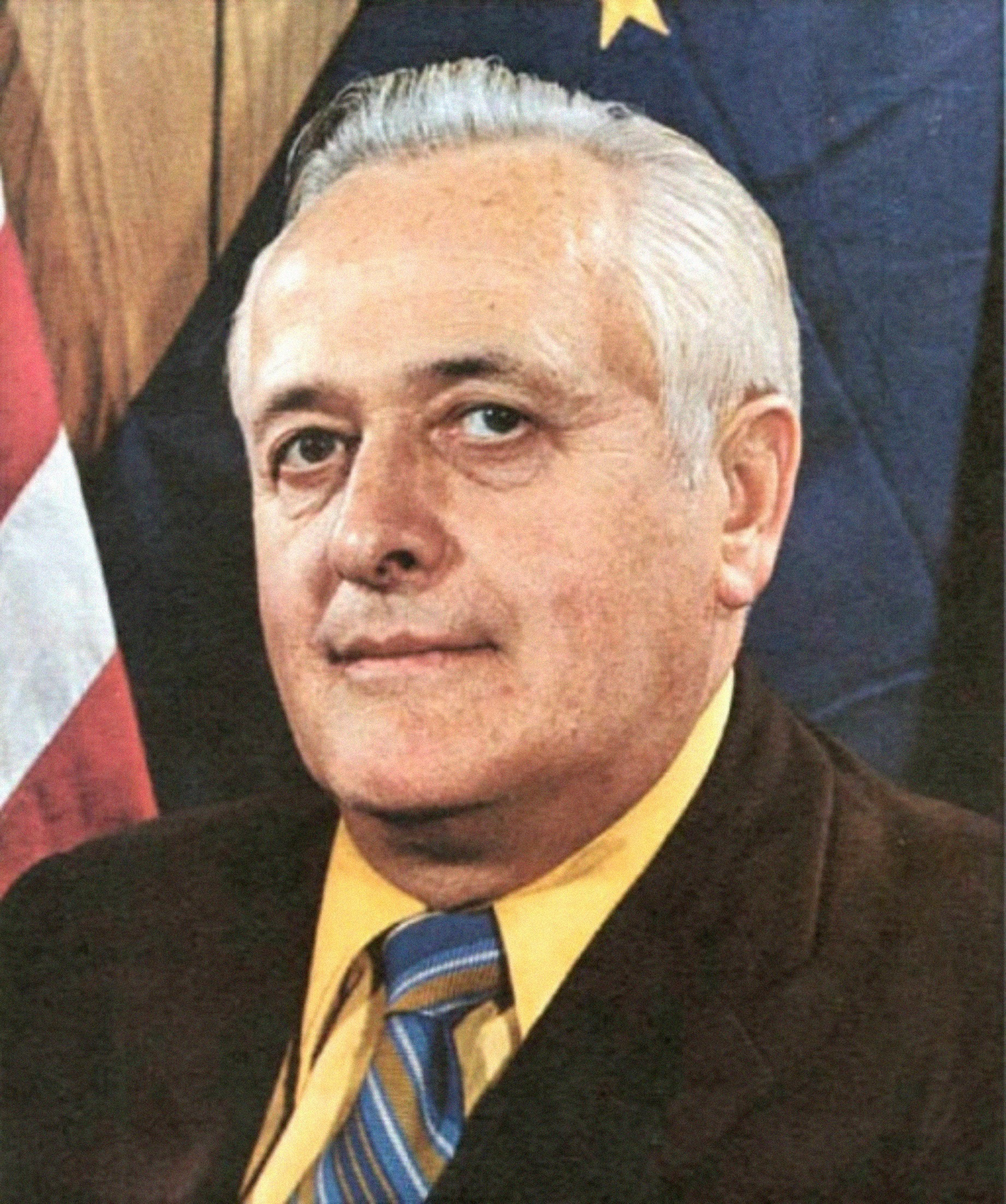

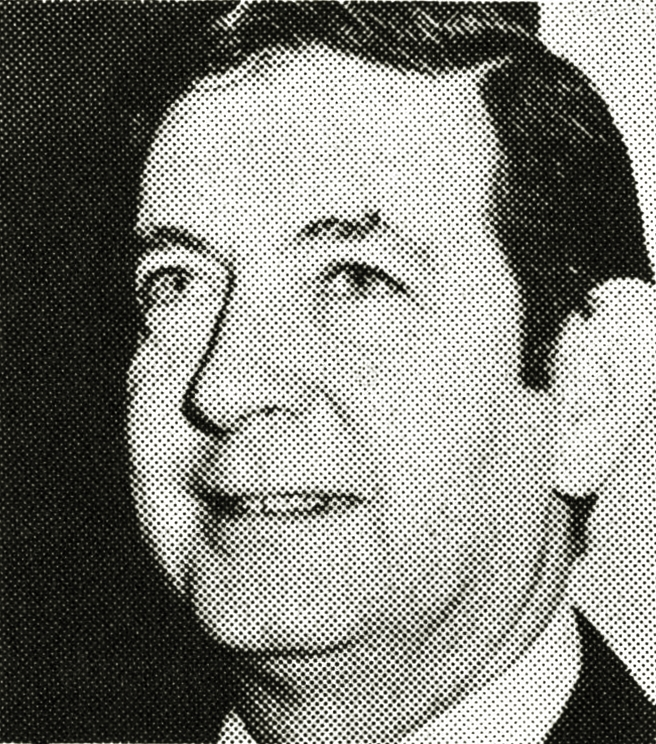
Nominee	Bill Egan	Keith H. Miller
Party	Democratic	Republican
Running mate	Red Boucher	Robert W. Ward
Popular vote	42,309	37,264
Percentage	52.38%	46.13%
- Results by state house district Egan: 50–60% 60–70% 70–80% 80–90% Miller: 40–50% 50–60% 60–70%
Governor before election
Keith H. Miller
Republican
Elected Governor
Bill Egan
Democratic

The 1970 Alaska gubernatorial election took place on November 3, 1970, for the post of Governor of Alaska. Former governor and Democratic candidate Bill Egan was able to defeat incumbent Republican governor Keith H. Miller after having lost his position in the previous election to Wally Hickel. Miller had been appointed to fill the rest of Hickel's term after Hickel was nominated to be the U.S. Secretary of the Interior under President Richard Nixon. Miller defeated Representative Howard Wallace Pollock for the Republican nomination.

== Results ==
1970 Alaska gubernatorial election
Party	Candidate	Votes	%	±%
Democratic	Bill Egan	42,309	52.38%	+4.01%
Republican	Keith H. Miller (incumbent)	37,264	46.13%	−3.86%
American Independent	Ralph Anderson	1,206	1.49%	
Majority		5,045	6.25%	
Turnout		80,779		
Democratic gain from Republican		Swing		

=== By district ===
District	Bill Egan Democratic		Keith Miller (incumbent) Republican		Ralph Anderson American Independent		Total votes
District	#	%	#	%	#	%	Total votes
District 1	2,675	59.8%	1,775	39.7%	25	0.5%	4,475
District 2	980	58.9%	678	40.8%	5	0.3%	1,663
District 3	1,438	62.1%	857	37.0%	22	0.9%	2,317
District 4	3,524	59.8%	2,341	39.7%	26	0.5%	5,891
District 5	942	71.5%	369	28.0%	7	0.5%	1,318
District 6	1,104	62.9%	632	36.0%	19	1.1%	1,755
District 7	820	33.5%	1,581	64.6%	48	1.9%	2,449
District 8	14,231	44.8%	17,126	53.9%	415	1.3%	31,772
District 9	438	45.8%	508	53.1%	10	1.1%	956
District 10	2,154	51.6%	1,876	44.9%	148	3.5%	4,178
District 11	1,218	66.9%	584	32.1%	19	1.0%	1,821
District 12	473	66.8%	212	29.9%	23	3.3%	708
District 13	792	68.6%	334	28.9%	28	2.5%	1,154
District 14	1,476	81.0%	305	16.7%	41	2.3%	1,822
District 15	1,019	54.8%	798	42.9%	44	2.3%	1,861
District 16	6,132	48.6%	6,227	49.3%	268	2.1%	12,627
District 17	1,183	74.7%	370	23.4%	30	1.9%	1,583
District 18	1,160	68.8%	511	30.3%	14	0.9%	1,685
District 19	550	73.9%	180	24.2%	14	1.9%	744
Totals	42,309	52.4%	37,264	46.1%	1,206	1.5%	80,779
