= H. A. Boucher =

American politician

Henry Aristide Boucher
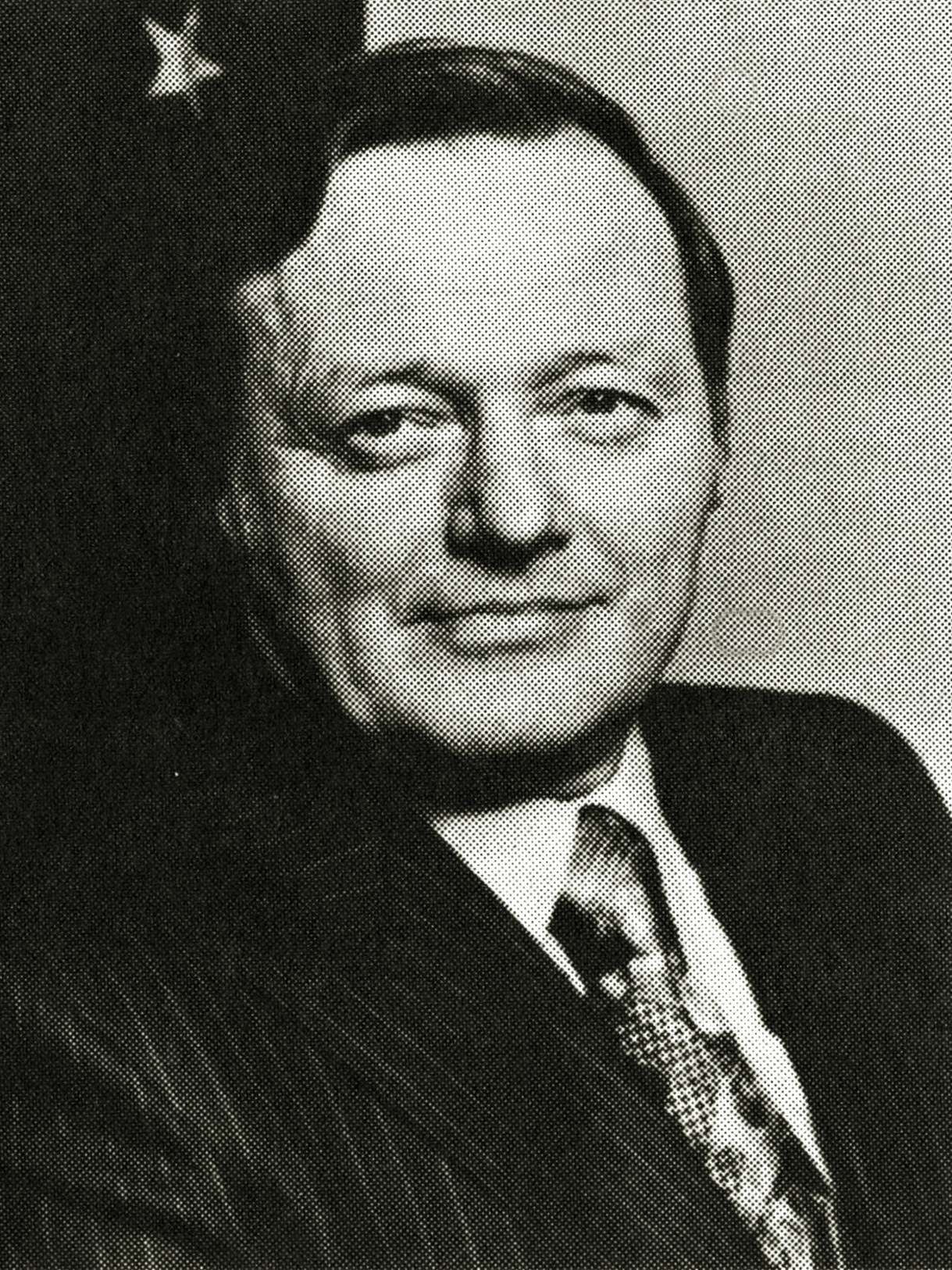

Member of the Anchorage Assembly from Seat F
- In office February 26, 1991 – October 1, 1991
- Preceded by: Kevin “Pat” Parnell
- Succeeded by: Dick Traini

Member of the Alaska House of Representatives from the 10-A district
- In office 1985–1991
- Preceded by: Charles Bussell
- Succeeded by: Larry Baker

2nd Lieutenant Governor of Alaska
- In office December 7, 1970 – December 2, 1974
- Governor: William A. Egan
- Preceded by: Robert W. Ward
- Succeeded by: Lowell Thomas Jr.

Mayor of Fairbanks
- In office 1966–1970
- Preceded by: Sylvia Ringstad
- Succeeded by: Julian C. Rice

Personal details
- Born: January 27, 1921 Nashua, New Hampshire, U.S.
- Died: June 19, 2009 (aged 88) Anchorage, Alaska, U.S.
- Party: Democratic
- Spouse: Vicky Elkins

Military service
- Branch/service: United States Navy
- Battles/wars: World War II

Henry Aristide "Red" Boucher Jr. (January 27, 1921 – June 19, 2009) was an American politician who served as the second lieutenant governor of Alaska from 1970 to 1974. He had also served as mayor of Fairbanks, Alaska, from 1966 to 1970, and in the Alaska House of Representatives. Boucher served on the Fairbanks City Council and Anchorage Assembly.

== Early life and military service ==
Born in Nashua, New Hampshire, to Henry Aristide Boucher Sr. and Helen Isabel Cameron, Boucher's father died shortly after his birth from lingering effects of exposure to mustard gas in World War I at the Battle of Verdun in 1916. He earned the nickname "Red" after he met President Franklin D. Roosevelt who told him, "They ought to call you Red." in reference to his red hair. After his mother developed multiple sclerosis, he and his brother were placed in St. Vincent's Orphanage in Fall River, Massachusetts.

Boucher enlisted in the navy at age 17, served aboard the USS Enterprise in the Pacific during World War II as an expert signalman and a meteorologist and achieved the rank of chief petty officer. He served during the Battle of Midway and numerous other battles for a total of twenty years in the navy, including a stint on the aircraft carrier USS Saratoga as chief petty officer for communications and meteorology.

== Career ==
After leaving the navy, Boucher and his family came to Alaska, settling in Fairbanks in 1958 after John F. Kennedy, whom he campaigned for, told him there was great potential in the far north territory. He founded the Fairbanks Goldpanners baseball team in the 1960s, setting up the roots of the Alaska Baseball League. He served on the Fairbanks City Council before becoming mayor in 1966. He was elected lieutenant governor of Alaska under the second administration of Governor William Allen Egan, serving from 1970 to 1974. Afterwards, served in the Alaska House of Representatives and Anchorage Assembly. Boucher ran for Governor of Alaska in 1982, but came fifth in the open primary. He also ran for Mayor of Anchorage in 1987, but lost the election.

He also had an interest in telecommunications, sparked by the first Apple computers, and became known as a telecommunications whiz whose successes included a crusade to boost Internet access in remote Alaska villages.

== Personal life ==
Boucher suffered a stroke in 2005 and died aged 88 on June 19, 2009, at his home in Anchorage.

Party political offices
Preceded by Hugh Wade	Democratic nominee for Lieutenant Governor of Alaska; 1970, 1974	Succeeded by Katie Hurley
Political offices
Preceded by Sylvia Ringstad	Mayor of Fairbanks, Alaska; 1966–1970	Succeeded by Julian C. Rice
Preceded by Robert W. Ward	Lieutenant governor of Alaska; 1970–1974	Succeeded by Lowell Thomas Jr.
