= 1966 Alaska gubernatorial election =

- November 8, 1966
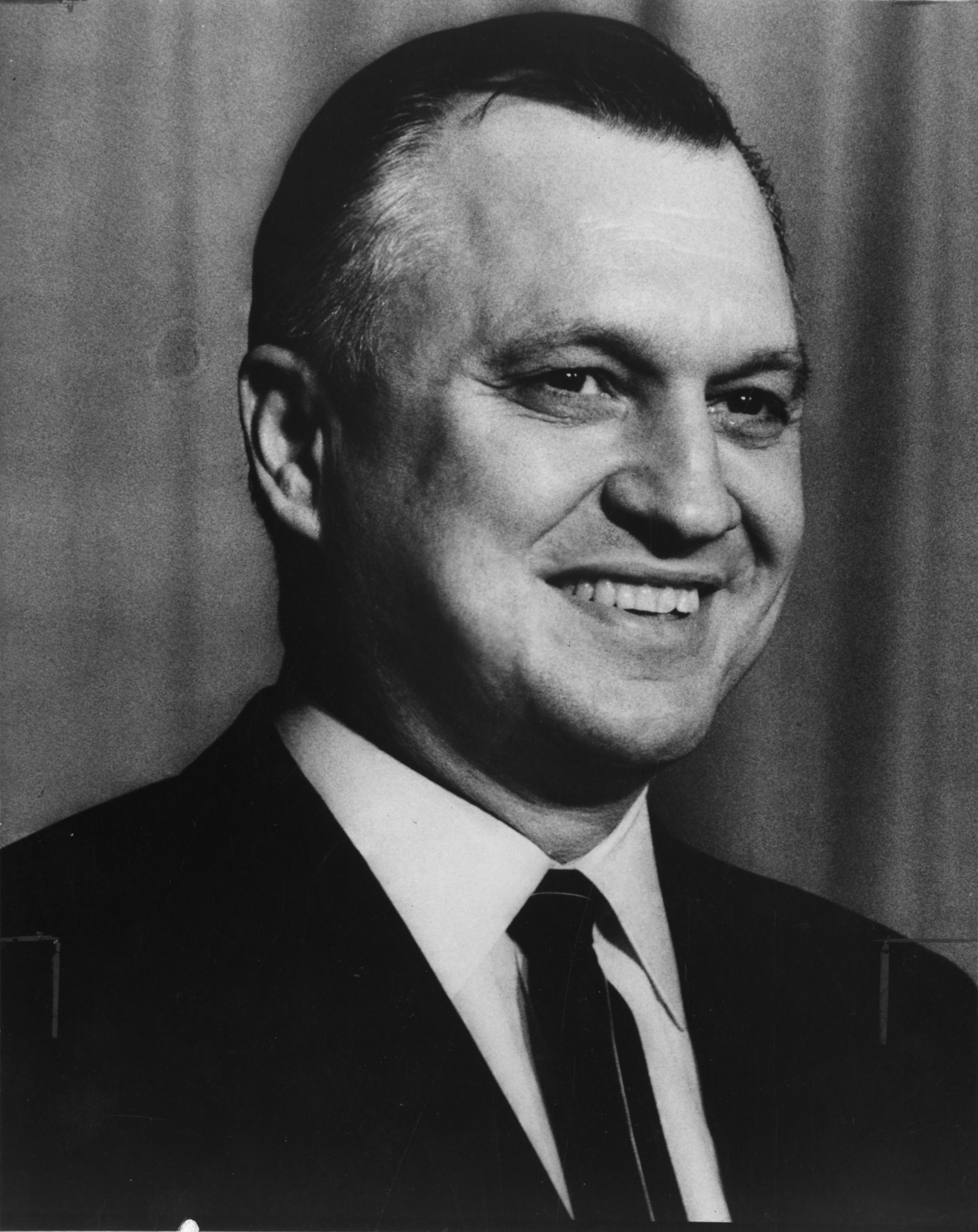

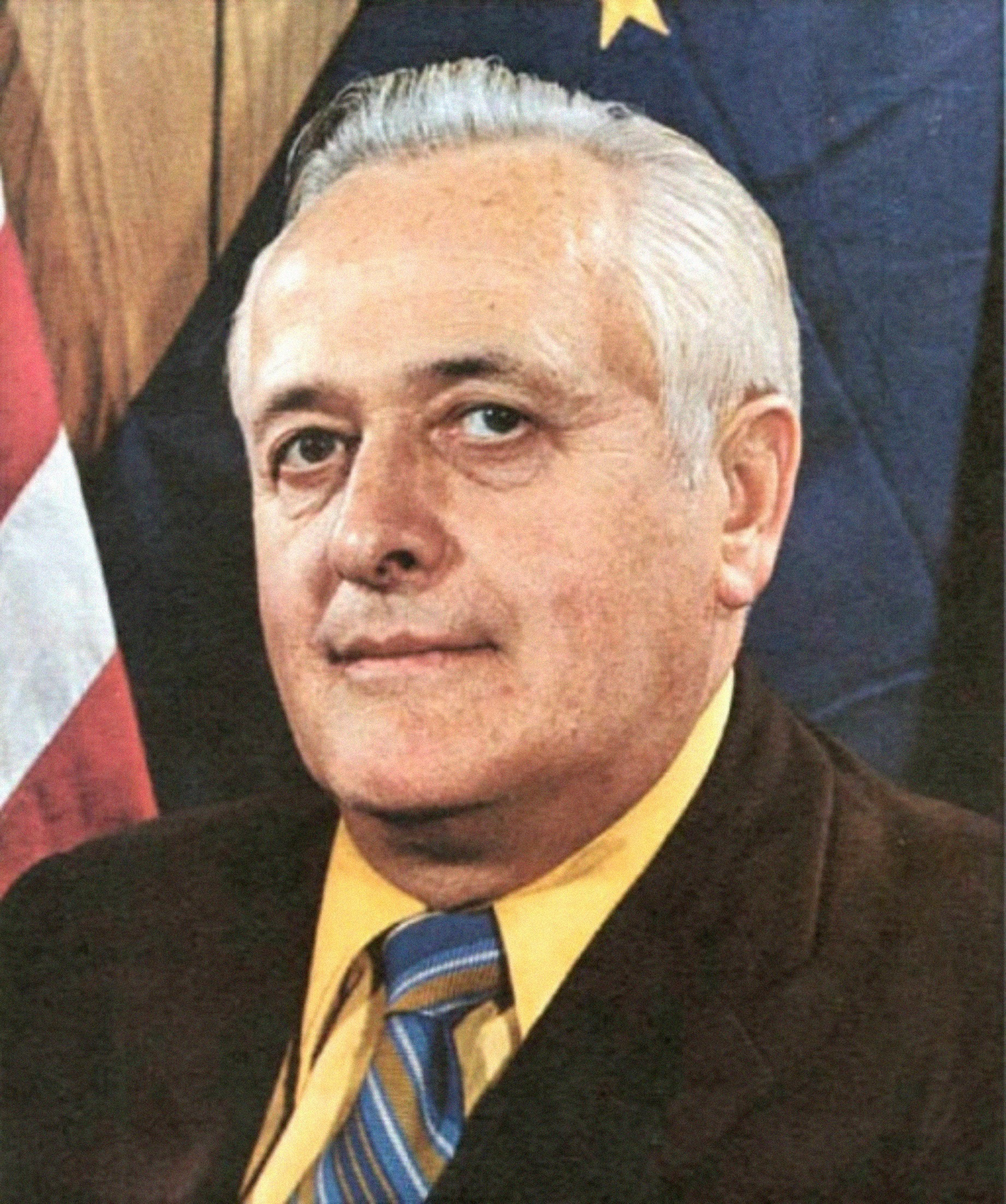
Nominee	Wally Hickel	William A. Egan
Party	Republican	Democratic
Running mate	Keith H. Miller	Hugh Wade
Popular vote	33,145	32,065
Percentage	49.99%	48.37%
- Results by state house district Hickel: 40–50% 50–60% 60–70% Egan: 50–60% 60–70% 70–80%
Governor before election
William A. Egan
Democratic
Elected Governor
Wally Hickel
Republican

The 1966 Alaska gubernatorial election took place on November 8, 1966, for the post of Governor of Alaska. Republican challenger Wally Hickel narrowly defeated incumbent Democratic governor William A. Egan, falling just 3 votes short of an overall majority. Hickel had defeated former State House Speaker Bruce B. Kendall and former Territorial Governor Mike Stepovich for the Republican nomination, while Egan was challenged in the Democratic primary by former House Speaker Wendell P. Kay.

== Results ==
1966 Alaska gubernatorial election
Party	Candidate	Votes	%	±%
Republican	Wally Hickel	33,145	49.99%	+2.26%
Democratic	William A. Egan (inc.)	32,065	48.37%	−3.90%
Independent	John Grasse	1,084	1.64%	
Majority		1,080	1.63%	
Turnout		66,294		
Republican gain from Democratic		Swing		
