= 1962 Alaska gubernatorial election =

- November 6, 1962
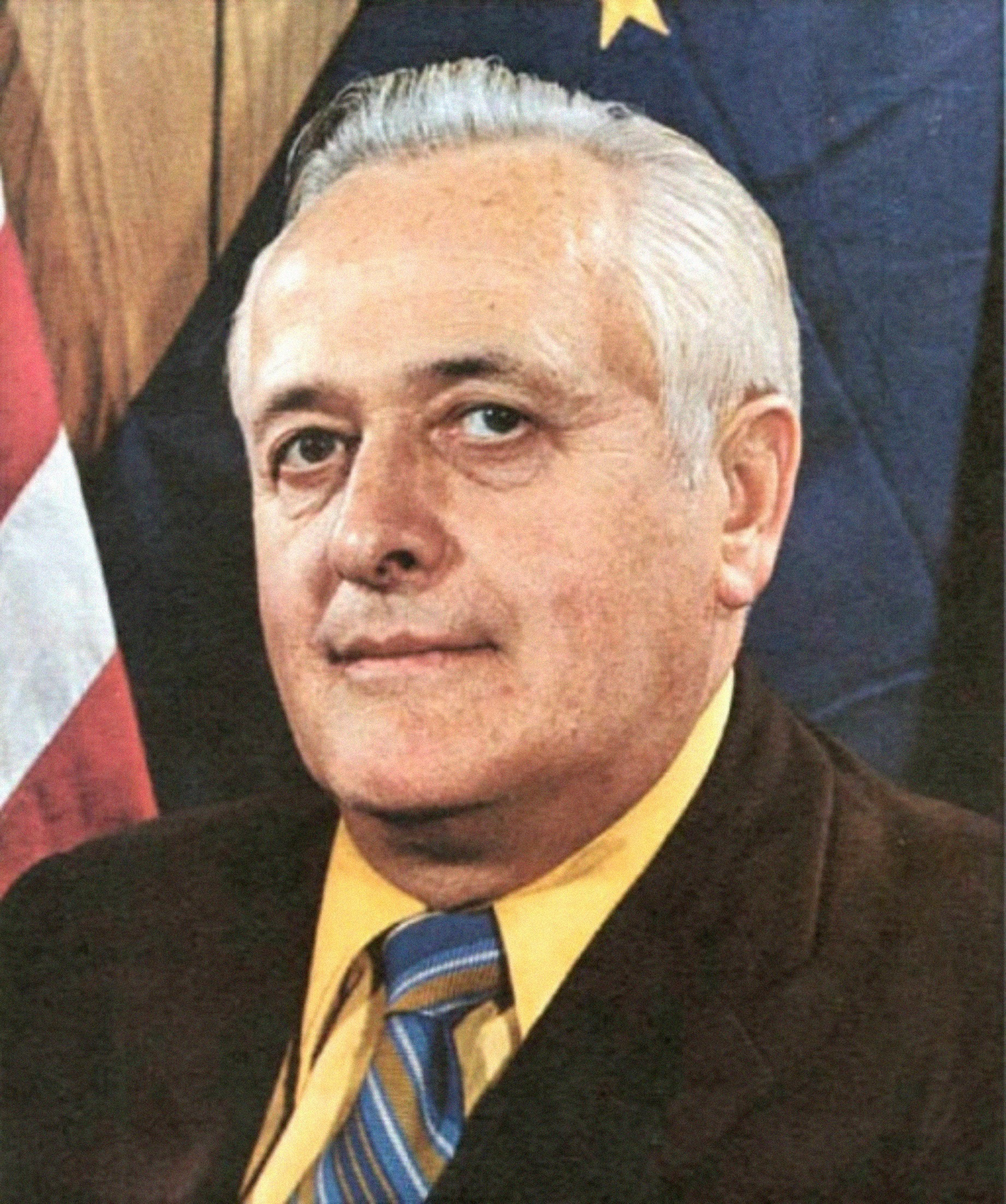

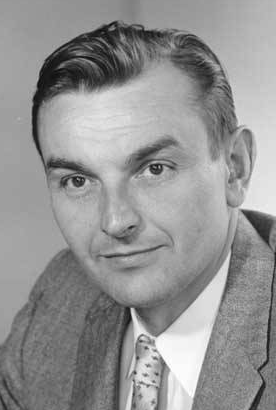
Nominee	William A. Egan	Mike Stepovich
Party	Democratic	Republican
Running mate	Hugh Wade	Ross
Popular vote	29,627	27,054
Percentage	52.27%	47.73%
- Egan: 50–60% 60–70% 70–80% Stepovich: 50–60%
Governor before election
William A. Egan
Democratic
Elected Governor
William A. Egan
Democratic

The 1962 Alaska gubernatorial election took place on November 6, 1962, for the post of Governor of Alaska. Incumbent Democratic governor William A. Egan was re-elected, defeating Republican challenger and former governor of Alaska Territory Mike Stepovich. In the primary elections, Egan defeated George Byer and Warren A. Taylor, while Stepovich defeated Howard Wallace Pollock and Jack Coghill.

== Candidates ==
The following candidates appeared on the primary election ballot:

=== Democratic ===
- David Newton Boyer, Kenai Peninsula business owner
- George H. Byer, former Mayor of Anchorage
- William A. Egan, incumbent governor
- Warren A. Taylor, Fairbanks attorney, constitutional convention delegate, Speaker of the Alaska House for the previous four sessions

Taylor simultaneously ran for governor and for reelection to his House seat.

=== Republican ===
- John B. Coghill, Nenana business owner and state senator, constitutional convention delegate
- Milo H. Fritz, Anchorage physician, medical missionary with the Episcopal Missionary District of Alaska in rural Alaska
- Verne O. Martin, Anchorage attorney
- Howard Pollock, Anchorage attorney, state senator
- Mike Stepovich, Fairbanks attorney, former territorial governor

=== Write-in ===
Following the primary election, the race featured a declared write-in candidate, Robert W. Hamilton of College. Hamilton owned a gas station in Lemeta, then a suburb of and presently a neighborhood of Fairbanks, and was a former educator and road construction foreman. He was backed by a group calling itself the Alaska Betterment Club. Due to the newness of Alaska as a state, questions arose about the legality of his campaign. His vote total is unknown as it was not included in the published results.

== Results ==
1962 Alaska gubernatorial election
Party	Candidate	Votes	%	±%
Democratic	Bill Egan (inc.)	29,627	52.27%	−7.34%
Republican	Mike Stepovich	27,054	47.73%	+7.34%
Majority		2,573	4.54%	
Turnout		56,681		
Democratic hold		Swing		
