= Mike Stepovich =

American politician (1919–2014)

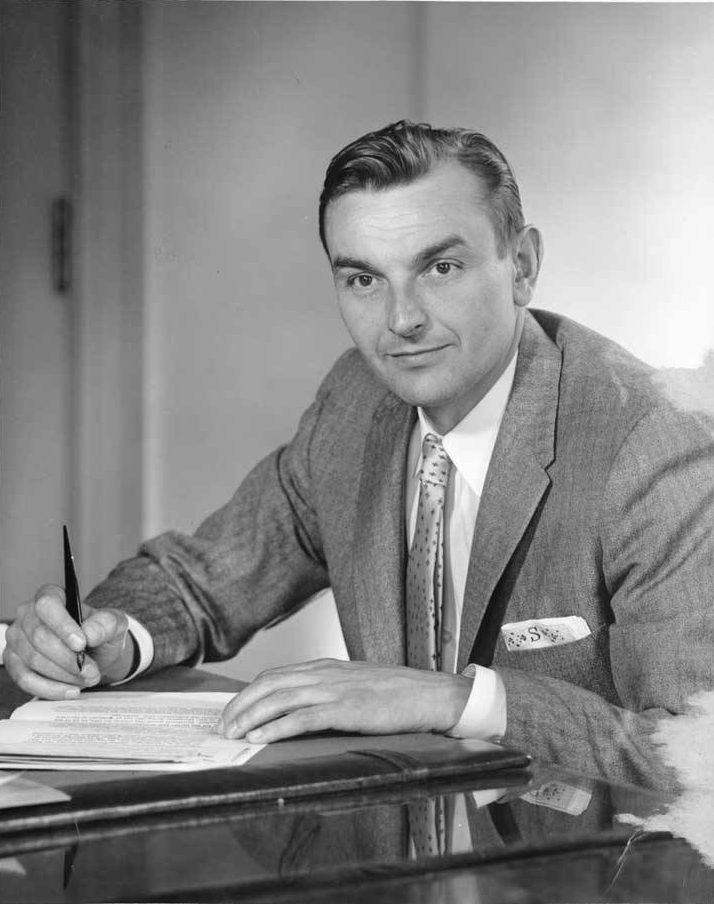
- Stepovich in 1957

9th Governor of Alaska Territory
- In office June 5, 1957 – August 1, 1958
- Lieutenant: Waino Hendrickson
- Preceded by: Waino Hendrickson (Acting)
- Succeeded by: Waino Hendrickson (Acting)

Personal details
- Born: Michael Anthony Stepovich; March 12, 1919 Fairbanks, Territory of Alaska, U.S.
- Died: February 14, 2014 (aged 94) San Diego, California, U.S.
- Party: Republican
- Spouse: Matilda Baricevic (m. 1947; died 2003)
- Relations: Nicole Burdette (niece); John Stockton (son-in-law); Michael Stockton (grandson); David Stockton (grandson)
- Children: 13
- Education: Gonzaga University (BA); University of Notre Dame (LLB)

Military service
- Allegiance: United States
- Branch/service: United States Navy
- Years of service: 1943–1947
- Rank: Yeoman (Third Class)
- Battles/wars: World War II

Michael Anthony Stepovich (March 12, 1919 – February 14, 2014) was an American lawyer and politician who served as the last non-interim governor of the Territory of Alaska. Stepovich served as Territorial Governor from 1957 to 1958, and Alaska was given U.S. statehood in 1959.

Stepovich was born in Fairbanks, Alaska, and grew up in Portland, Oregon. His parents had immigrated to the United States from what is now Montenegro and Croatia in the late 19th century. Following his education and military service during World War II, Stepovich established a law practice in Fairbanks and began his political career by winning three terms in the Alaska Territorial legislature. During his term as governor, he was a leading advocate in the effort to gain statehood for Alaska. Following Alaska's admission to the Union, he made an unsuccessful run for a U.S. Senate seat and two unsuccessful attempts to be elected Governor of Alaska.

Stepovich was involved in public service for decades, ranging from his service in World War II to his post-statehood political career. He was a large part in the effort for obtaining Alaska statehood, beginning with his appointment as governor in 1957.

== Early life and education ==
Stepovich was born to a well-known Montenegrin miner father, Michael "Wise Mike" Stepovich, and a Croatian mother, Olga (from Sutivan, Brač), in Fairbanks, Alaska, on March 12, 1919. The Stijepovich family is one of the oldest families in Risan, today Montenegro. His father, originally called Marko, moved from there to the USA 1892. His parents divorced when he was 6 months old and his mother took him to Portland, Oregon, where he was raised by his mother and stepfather. Stepovich was educated in parochial schools and Portland's Columbia Preparatory School before enrolling at the University of Portland in 1937. He graduated from Gonzaga University with a Bachelor of Arts in 1940 and from the University of Notre Dame with a Bachelor of Laws in 1943.

=== Military service ===
After completing his law degree, Stepovich enlisted in the United States Navy and was assigned to Camp Parks' legal office. After three-and-a-half years of military service, he was discharged as a yeoman third class. Following his discharge in 1947, he returned to Portland for a short time to court his future wife before moving to Fairbanks, Alaska.

== Career ==
In Fairbanks, he took his bar examination, was appointed city attorney by the end of the year, and established a private practice.

Stepovich began his political career in 1950 when, running as a Republican, he won a seat in the Alaska Territorial House of Representatives. Two year later he advanced to take a seat in the Alaska Territorial Senate. He remained in the senate for two terms, becoming the minority leader in 1955.

=== Territorial Governor of Alaska ===
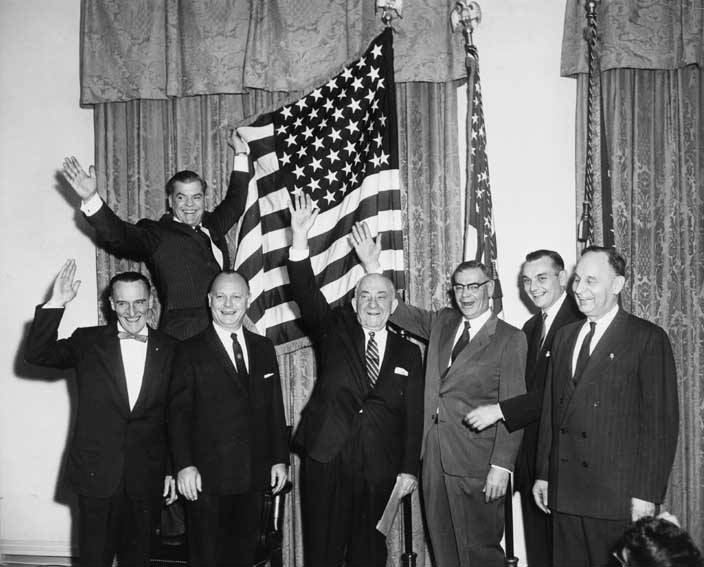
Stepovich (bottom, second from right) celebrating Alaska becoming a state, January 3, 1959

The appointment of Stepovich as Governor of Alaska Territory came as a result of a recommendation by U.S. Secretary of the Interior Fred Seaton. Seaton had traveled to the territory to interview potential candidates following the resignation of Governor B. Frank Heintzleman. While the Fairbanks attorney had not applied for the position, Seaton was still impressed by him. President Dwight Eisenhower nominated Stepovich for the position on May 9, 1957, and he took office on June 5 as the territory's first native-born non-acting governor.

Much of the new governor's term was spent lobbying for Alaska statehood. In this effort he traveled widely through the Continental United States speaking and giving interviews on behalf of the territory. His efforts even included a January 19, 1958 appearance on the game show What's My Line?

=== Involvement in the Alaska Statehood Act ===
Stepovich was seated in the House Gallery when the House cast their votes on the Alaska Statehood Act. Upon its passage by the House, Stepovich would celebrate with Delegate E.L. "Bob" Bartlett, as well as New York Representative Leo W. O'Brien, and Pennsylvania Representative John Saylor. The bill passed, despite opposition from the powerful Chair of the Rules Committee, Virginia Representative Howard Smith & House Minority Leader Joe Martin. This was namely because of powerful House Speaker Sam Rayburn, who was one of the most influential members of Congress, and heavily backed the Alaska Statehood Act, partially because Alaska was heavily Democratic. Cheers came from the streets of Alaska as the news came to the soon-to-be state, and an Alaskan native remarked "It's a good thing. I like to see it come on fine. I will enjoy my first vote for President."

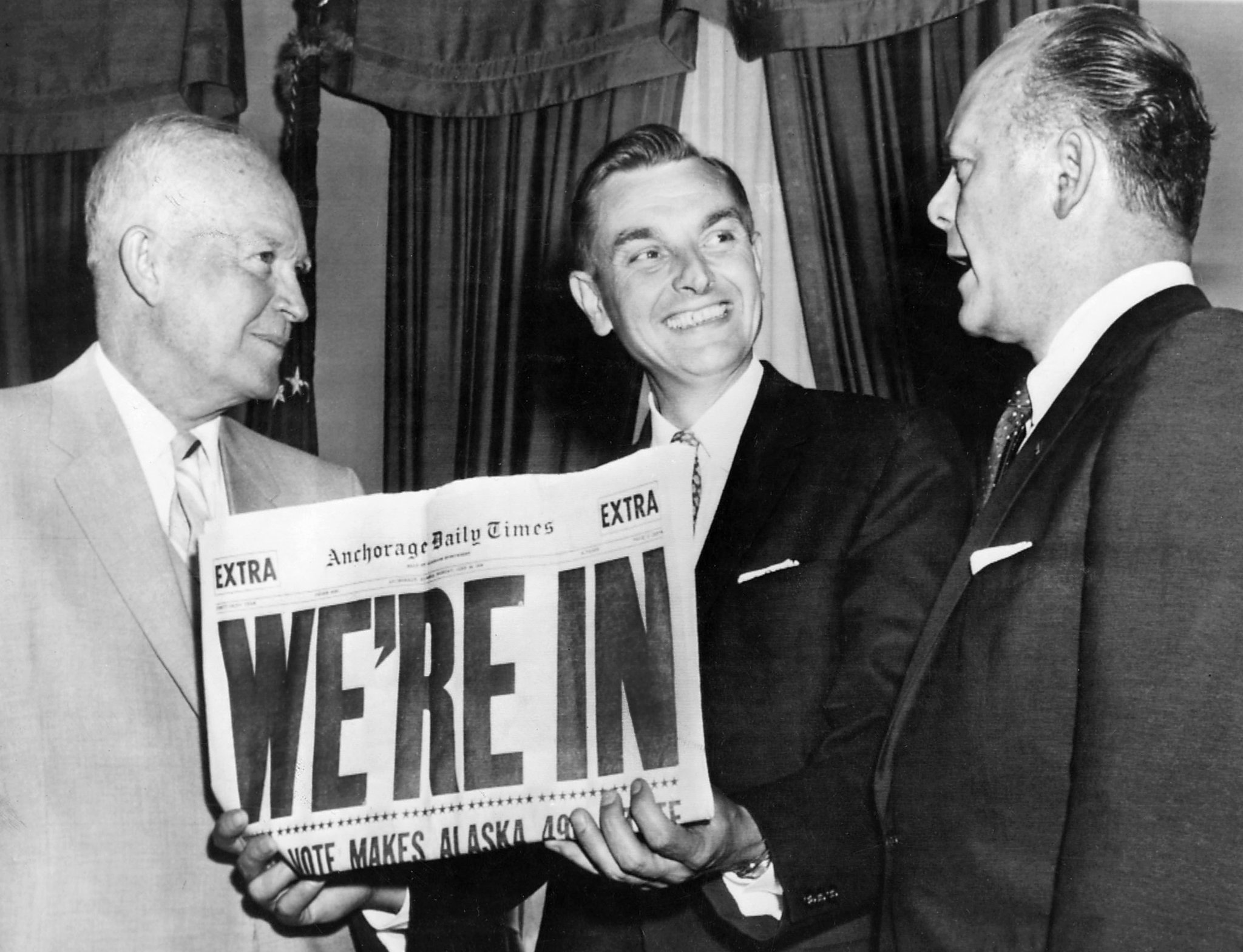
Stepovich with President Eisenhower and Secretary of the Interior Fred Seaton, c. 1958 or 1959

President Eisenhower signed the Alaskan Statehood Bill on July 7, 1958. Following this event, Stepovich issued a proclamation setting the dates for primary and general elections to determine officeholders for the new state, setting the elections for November 25. The Territorial Governor then resigned on August 1, 1958, to run for a seat in the United States Senate. Following his departure, Territorial Secretary Waino Edward Hendrickson succeeded as Acting Governor.

=== Post-gubernatorial career ===
Stepovich's bid for a United States Senate seat was unsuccessful. He was defeated by Ernest Gruening in the November 25, 1958, election, held just before Alaska became a state on January 3, 1959.

In 1960, Stepovich campaigned against an unsuccessful ballot initiative to move the state capital from Juneau to Anchorage.

Stepovich ran for governor of Alaska in 1962, winning the Republican nomination, but was defeated by the Democratic incumbent William A. Egan by a narrow margin.

Stepovich lost to Wally Hickel in the Republican primary for governor in 1966. This was his final campaign for office.

Following his unsuccessful Senate run, Stepovich returned to his legal practice in Fairbanks. He remained there until 1978 when he and his wife relocated to Medford, Oregon. Despite the move, the former governor still maintained his legal residence in Fairbanks.

== Personal life and family ==
Stepovich married Matilda Baricevic in November 1947. The couple had 13 children. His daughter Nada married NBA player John Stockton. His niece is actress and playwright Nicole Burdette.

On November 25, 2003, Stepovich's wife, Matilda, died.

Stepovich was granted an honorary doctorate by the University of Alaska Fairbanks on May 10, 2009.

While visiting his son in San Diego, California, Stepovich suffered a head injury as result of a fall. He died on February 14, 2014, after spending six days in a hospital. At the time of his death, he was the last living former American governor who left office in the 1950s. Stepovich's body was returned to Fairbanks, Alaska. A memorial service was held for him at Sacred Heart Cathedral on February 28, 2014, followed by burial at Birch Hill Cemetery.

Political offices
Preceded by Waino Hendrickson; Acting	Governor of Alaska; 1957–1958	Succeeded by Waino Hendrickson; Acting
Party political offices
First	Republican nominee for U.S. Senator from Alaska (Class 3); 1958	Succeeded by Ted Stevens
Preceded by John Butrovich	Republican nominee for Governor of Alaska; 1962	Succeeded by Wally Hickel
Honorary titles
Preceded by George M. Leader	Earliest Serving Governor Still Living; 2013–2014	Succeeded by John M. Patterson
