= John Butrovich =

American businessman and politician

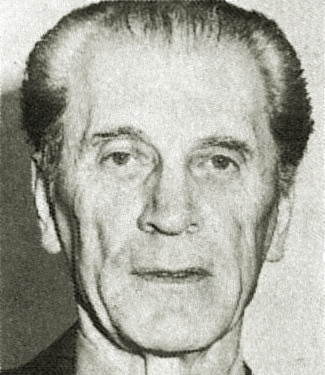

Personal details
- Born: March 22, 1910 Fairbanks, District of Alaska, United States
- Died: June 3, 1997 (aged 87) Fairbanks, Alaska, United States
- Political party: Republican
- Spouse: Grace Butrovich (m. 1936)
- Children: 1
- Education: Washington State University, Pullman; University of Alaska, Fairbanks

John Butrovich Jr. (March 22, 1910 – June 3, 1997) was an American businessman and politician from Alaska. He was a member of the Republican Party, and was that party's nominee in the 1958 gubernatorial election.

== Life and career ==
Butrovich was born on March 22, 1910, in a mining camp near Fairbanks, Alaska, to a Croatian American family, Butrovich graduated from Fairbanks High School in 1929. He then went to Washington State University. He returned to Fairbanks and was in the insurance business. He married Grace Meggitt in 1936, and they had one daughter together. From 1944 to 1958, Butrovich served in the Alaska Territorial Senate and was a Republican. He was the speaker of the delegation sent to President Eisenhower to convince him to sign the statehood bill. In 1958, Butrovich ran in the election for Governor of Alaska and lost the election to Bill Egan, 59.6% to 39.4%. From 1963 to 1979, Butrovich served in the Alaska State Senate. He was named Alaskan of the Year in 1980, and awarded an honorary degree by the University of Alaska. The Butrovich Building, a building on the University of Alaska Fairbanks campus which runs the University of Alaska's statewide administration, is named after him.

== Death ==
Butrovich died at his home in Fairbanks, Alaska after a battle with a long illness. He was 87.

== Notes ==
Party political offices
First	Republican nominee for Governor of Alaska; 1958	Succeeded by Mike Stepovich
