= Keith Harvey Miller =

Governor of Alaska from 1969 to 1970

Keith Miller
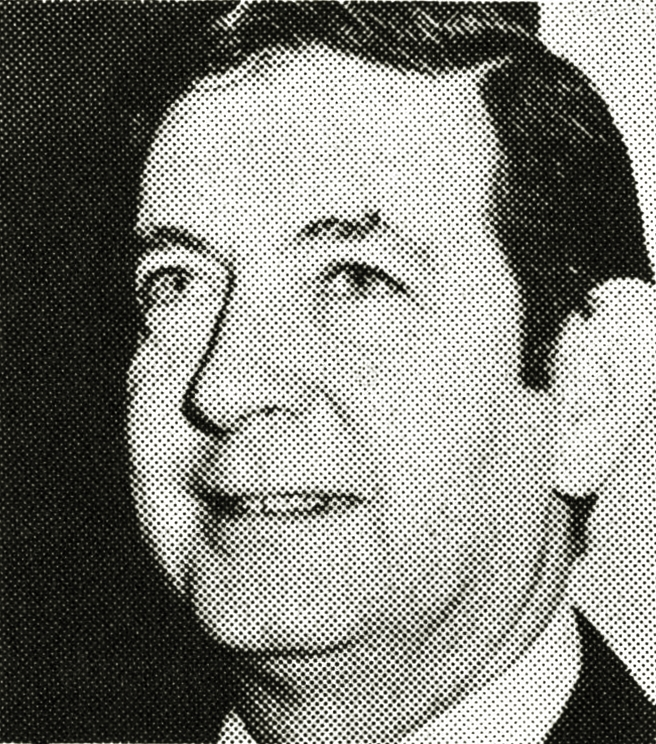

3rd Governor of Alaska
- In office January 29, 1969 – December 7, 1970
- Lieutenant: Robert Ward
- Preceded by: Wally Hickel
- Succeeded by: William Egan

Secretary of State of Alaska
- In office December 5, 1966 – January 29, 1969
- Governor: Wally Hickel
- Preceded by: Hugh Wade
- Succeeded by: Robert Ward

Personal details
- Born: Keith Harvey Miller; March 1, 1925 Seattle, Washington, U.S.
- Died: March 2, 2019 (aged 94) Anchorage, Alaska, U.S.
- Party: Republican
- Relatives: Robert Miller (brother)
- Education: University of Idaho, Moscow; University of Washington, Seattle (BS)

Keith Harvey Miller (March 1, 1925 – March 2, 2019) was an American Republican politician from Alaska. Miller was the second secretary of state of Alaska under Walter Hickel. He became the third governor of Alaska after Hickel’s resignation to become U.S. Secretary of the Interior. Under his tenure, Alaska came into sudden wealth after an oil lease sale on the North Slope created a revenue of $900 million.

== Early life ==
Keith Harvey Miller was born in Seattle, Washington on March 1, 1925, one of four sons of Hopkins Keith Miller (1901–1981) and Sarah Margaret (née Harvey) Miller (1903–1960). He grew up in the rural outskirts of Seattle before the family moved to the vicinity of Bothell, Washington in 1939. Miller attended and graduated from high school in Bothell. He briefly studied at the University of Idaho before joining the United States Army Air Forces, serving during the last two years of World War II.

== Early career and move to Alaska ==
After leaving the military, Miller established a holly farm in Olympia, Washington in 1946. During this time, he spent portions of several summers working in the Territory of Alaska and also studied at the University of Washington, Seattle, graduating with a Bachelor of Science degree in 1952. Miller sold the holly farm in 1953, the same year he married Diana Mary Doyle in Seattle and established a collection agency there. He sold the agency in 1957 after being hired by the Internal Revenue Service, who stationed him in Anchorage, Alaska.

== Early political career ==
Miller began his political career in 1962 with his election to the Alaska House of Representatives., where he served one term. He served as Secretary of State of Alaska (now the Lieutenant Governor of Alaska) from 1966 until Hickel resigned to become United States Secretary of the Interior under President Richard M. Nixon, on January 29, 1969. He was promptly elevated to the position of Governor of Alaska.

== Governor of Alaska ==
Under Governor Miller, Alaska completed the sale of land leases in Prudhoe Bay, which brought a windfall of $900 million. The funds from the oil leases were seven times the state’s budget and seven years after he first proposed an investment fund for oil royalties, Governor Jay Hammond established the Alaska Permanent Fund.

He lobbied extensively for the Trans-Alaska Pipeline. He pushed the Congress to approve the pipeline over the objections of Federal Judge George Hart and the Alaska Legislature for funds to build a road to the Prudhoe Bay Oil Field.

In 1970, seeking election to a full term, he saw his popularity diminish as his former running mate, Walter Hickel, delayed issuance of the permit to build the pipeline. He faced a primary election challenge from two-term Congressman Howard Wallace Pollock. He defeated Pollock, but faced William A. Egan, who was Alaska’s first governor, in the general election. Egan won the race, 52.4% to 46.1%. Only after the 1973 oil crisis did Congress pass the Trans-Alaska Pipeline Authorization Act that Miller sought.

== Later career ==
In 1972, Miller was elected to a four-year term in the Alaska Senate. That term was cut short due to a challenge of the redistricting plan drawn up by the Alaska Supreme Court in 1972, centered on the apportionment of Senate districts in Anchorage. The court drew up a new plan in 1974. Rather than run for reelection in the new, Democratic-leaning district, Miller made one more campaign for governor in the Republican primary. He faced Hickel and Jay Hammond, who became the party’s nominee. In 1977, Governor Hammond named Miller to a seat on the Alaska Transportation Commission to serve as its chair.

== Death ==
Miller died from pancreatic cancer while at a hospice in Anchorage a day after his 94th birthday on March 2, 2019. His wife, Jean Cuffel Miller, preceded him in death.

Political offices
Preceded by Hugh Wade	Lieutenant Governor of Alaska; 1966–1969	Succeeded by Robert Ward
Preceded by Wally Hickel	Governor of Alaska; 1969–1970	Succeeded by William Egan
Party political offices
Vacant Title last held by Brad Phillips	Republican nominee for Secretary of State of Alaska; 1966	Succeeded by Robert W. Ward
Preceded by Wally Hickel	Republican nominee for Governor of Alaska; 1970	Succeeded by Jay Hammond
