= 1958 Alaska gubernatorial election =

- November 25, 1958
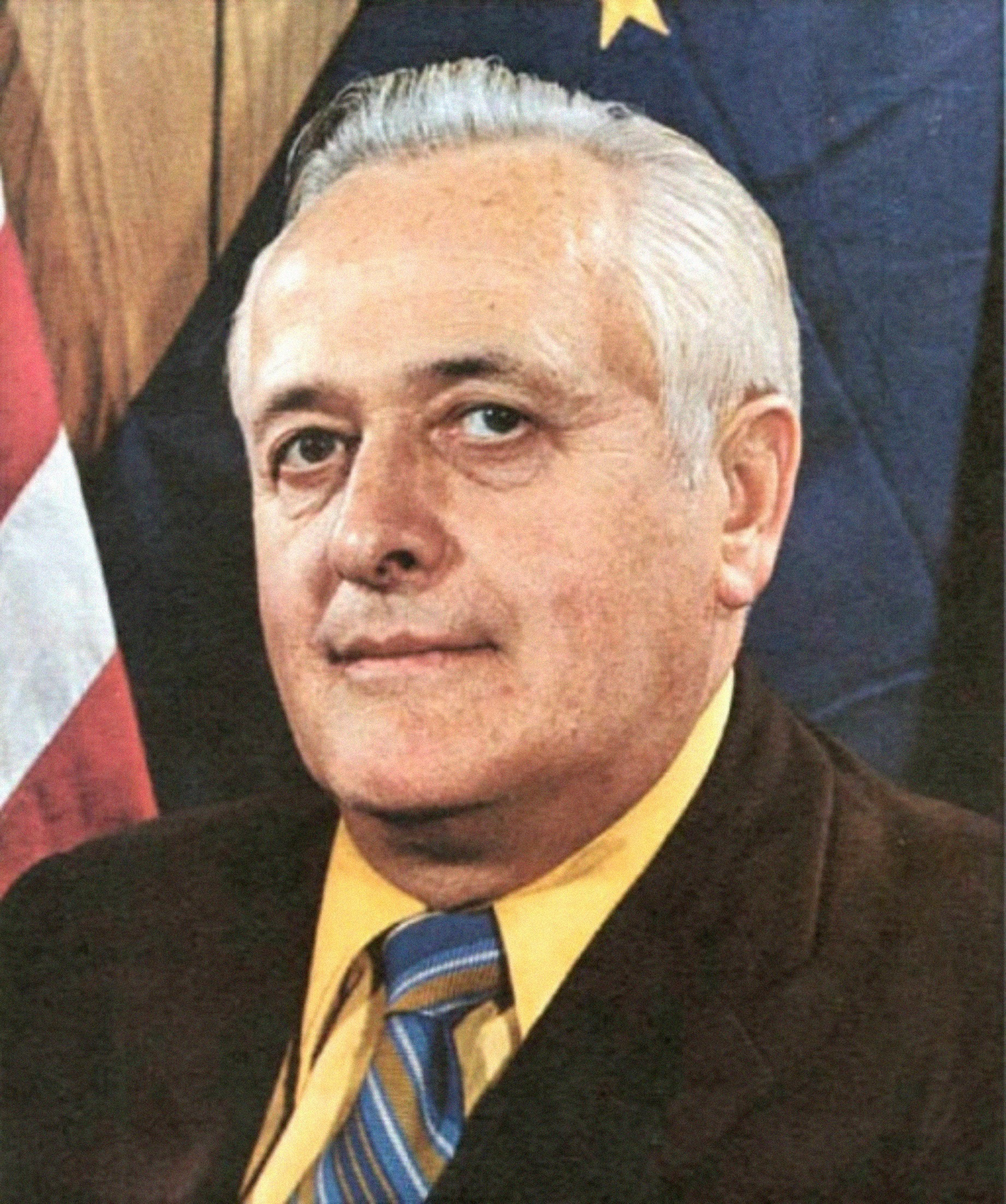

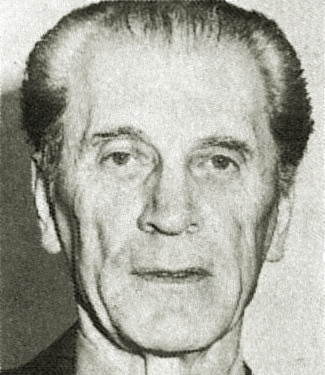
Nominee	William A. Egan	John Butrovich
Party	Democratic	Republican
Running mate	Hugh Wade	K.F. Dewey
Popular vote	29,189	19,299
Percentage	59.61%	39.41%
- Results by election district Egan: 40–50% 50–60% 60–70% 70–80% 80–90% Butrovich: 50–60%
Governor before election
Waino Hendrickson
Republican
Elected Governor
William A. Egan
Democratic

The 1958 Alaska gubernatorial election took place on November 25, 1958, for the post of Governor of Alaska. It was Alaska's first gubernatorial election as a U.S. state, although this did not take effect until January 3, 1959. Democratic Shadow Senator William A. Egan and his running mate Hugh Wade defeated Republican State Senator John Butrovich and his running mate, former territorial tax commissioner K.F. Dewey.

== Results ==
Democratic primary results
Party	Candidate	Votes	%
Democratic	William A. Egan	22,735	61.06%
Democratic	Victor C. Rivers	8,845	23.75%
Democratic	Gerald "Jerry" Williams	5,656	3.82%
Total votes		37,236	100.00%

Republican primary results
Party	Candidate	Votes	%
Republican	John Butrovich	9,693	100%
Total votes		9,693	100.00%

1958 Alaska gubernatorial election
Party	Candidate	Votes	%	±%
Democratic	William A. Egan	29,189	59.61%	
Republican	John Butrovich	19,299	39.41%	
Independent	Mike Dollinter	480	0.98%	
Majority		9,890	20.20%	
Turnout		48,968		
Democratic gain from Republican		Swing		
