= Lowell Thomas Jr. =

American politician (1923–2016)

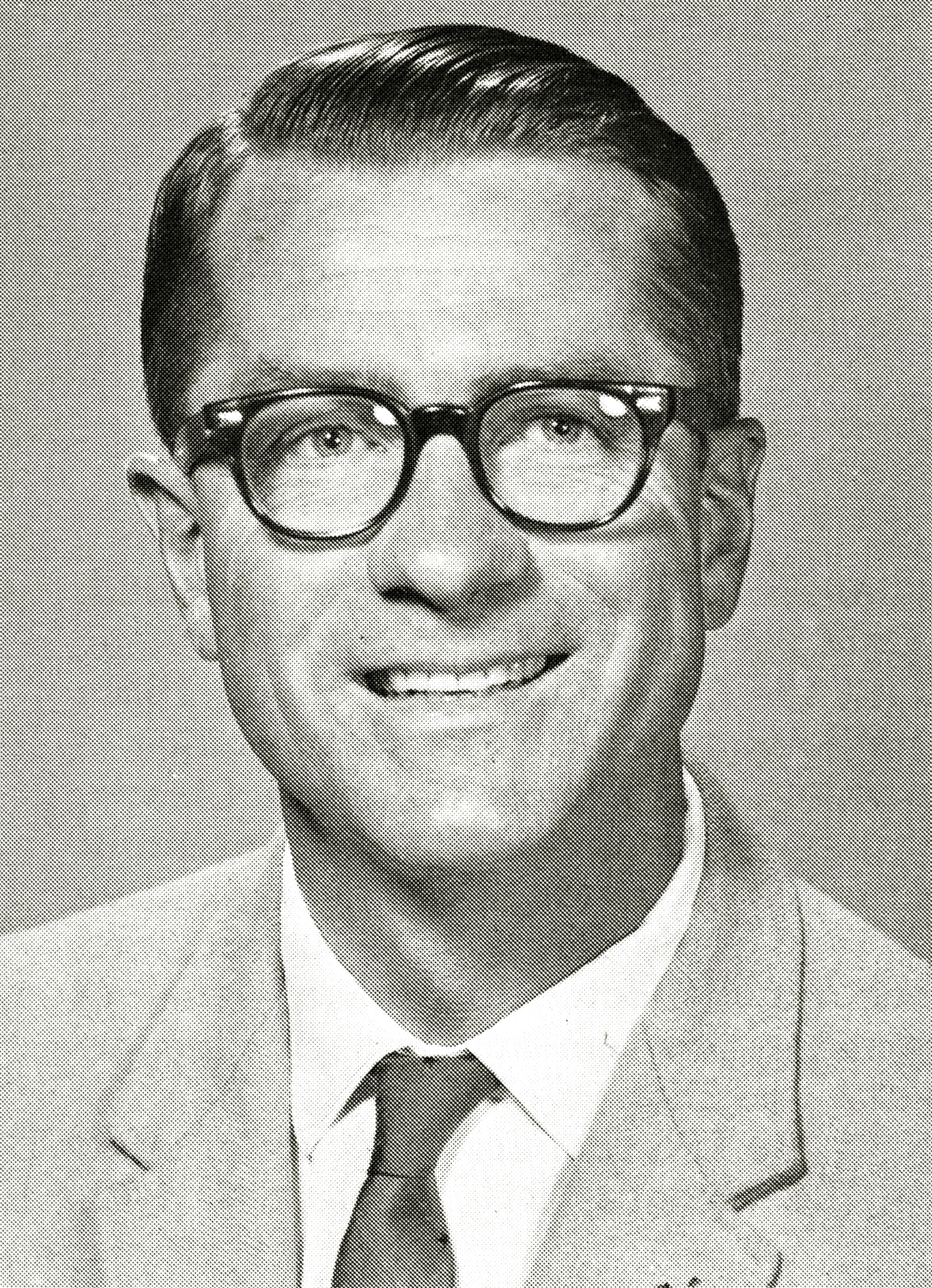
- Official portrait, 1975

3rd Lieutenant Governor of Alaska
- In office December 2, 1974 – December 4, 1978
- Governor: Jay Hammond
- Preceded by: H. A. Boucher
- Succeeded by: Terry Miller

Member of the Alaska Senate from District E
- In office January 23, 1967 – December 2, 1974

Personal details
- Born: October 6, 1923 London, England
- Died: October 1, 2016 (aged 92) Anchorage, Alaska, U.S.
- Party: Republican
- Spouse: Mary Taylor Pryor
- Children: 2
- Parent(s): Lowell Thomas Sr. Frances Ryan
- Profession: Author, film producer, lecturer, bush pilot
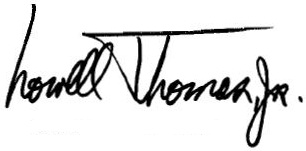
- Signature

Lowell Thomas Jr. (October 6, 1923 – October 1, 2016) was an American politician and film producer who collaborated with his father, the accomplished reporter and author Lowell Thomas, on several projects before becoming an Alaskan state senator in the early 1970s, and later the third lieutenant governor of Alaska from 1974 to 1978. In the 1980s, he owned and operated Talkeetna Air Taxi, an Alaska bush flying service.

== Early life ==
Thomas was born on October 6, 1923, in London, England. He was the son of Americans, Lowell Thomas Sr., a prominent writer, broadcaster, and traveler, and Frances "Fran" (née Ryan) Thomas.

He graduated from the Taft School in 1942 and went on to Dartmouth College, where he was a brother of the Delta Kappa Epsilon fraternity (Phi chapter), before joining the United States Army Air Corps.

In 2011, The Taft School honored him with the Horace D. Taft Alumni Medal and Citation of Merit.

== Career ==
In 1949, Thomas and his father were invited by the Tibetan government to make a film there with the hope that their reports would help persuade the U.S. government to defend Tibet against the Chinese. The trip lasted 400 days, and the father and son were the last Westerners to reach Lhasa before the Chinese invasion and occupation. CBS did not broadcast the resultant film, Expedition to Lhasa, Tibet, until years later, but his book about the expedition, Out of This World, published in 1950 became a bestseller.

In 1960, after the 14th Dalai Lama of Tibet was given refuge in India, he wrote the book The Silent War in Tibet. "Mr. Thomas describes the brutal Chinese Communist invasion of Tibet beginning in 1950..." and about the armed Tibetan resistance by citizens and lamas which began in the mid-1950s. He told the Anchorage Daily News, "I guess it was the greatest adventure I ever had." In 2006, the Dalai Lama bestowed the International Campaign for Tibet's Light of Truth Award on Lowell Jr and referred to him as "one of the grandfathers of modern day Tibet."

In 1954, Thomas and wife Mary Taylor Pryor, known as "Tay", flew a Cessna 180 around much of the world, logging over 50,000 miles. They wrote about it in their book Our Flight to Adventure.

=== Move to Alaska ===
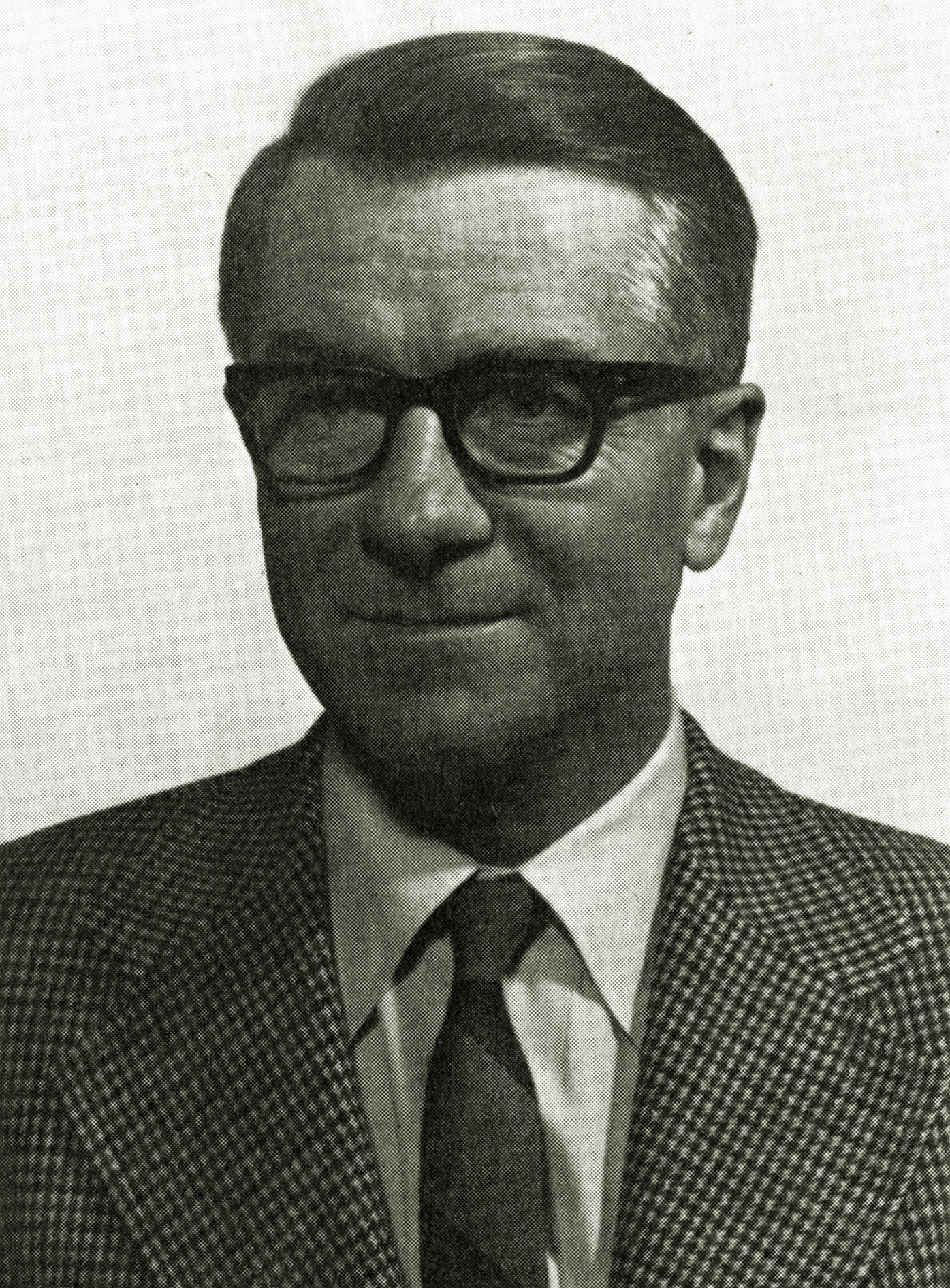
Thomas in 1977

The Thomases moved to Alaska in 1958 where they would remain for the remainder of their lives. After his political career, Thomas returned to flying, owning and operating Talkeetna Air Taxi and flying a Helio Courier for research and documentary work as well as flying climbers to and from Denali's Kahiltna Glacier and in the Alaska Range. He remained an active pilot into his 80s.

Among other appearances, in 1958 he appeared as a guest challenger on the TV panel show To Tell the Truth. In 1962, he narrated a children's recording, "The Story of Mr. Globe" which was produced by Replogle Globe, Inc in Chicago, Illinois.

From January 1967 until December 1974, he represented District E in the Alaska Senate as a Republican. He left the State Senate to become the 3rd lieutenant governor of Alaska under Governor Jay Hammond.

Long a resident of Alaska, he was known for his interest in the now-defunct Naval Arctic Research Laboratory based in Barrow, Alaska, currently the home of Iḷisaġvik College. Much as his father had done he ventured into the harsh environment of the ice islands where research was done by scientists on the Arctic Ocean and its atmosphere including the Auroras. He published his adventure in National Geographic in 1965 as well as numerous other productions and publications, including a movie on king crab in the Aleutian Islands.

=== Legacy and awards ===
The Thomases were generous philanthropists, and were involved in the building of the biathlon training facility above Girdwood, the Thomas Planetarium at the Anchorage Museum, and the Thomas Center for Senior Living at St. Mary's Episcopal Church where he and Tay were long-time members and supporters.

In 1995, he was awarded a lifetime achievement award by the National Parks Conservation Foundation, and in 2004 the Alaska Conservation Foundation awarded him with a lifetime achievement award as well. In 2001, he was awarded the first ever Bruce F. Vento Public Service Award by the National Park Trust.

Party political offices
Preceded by Robert W. Ward	Republican nominee for Lieutenant Governor of Alaska; 1974	Succeeded by Terry Miller
