= Trans-Alaska Pipeline Authorization Act =

1973 United States federal law

- Other short titles: Mineral Leasing Act of 1920 Amendments
- Long title: An Act to amend section 28 of the Mineral Leasing Act of 1920, and to authorize a trans-Alaska oil pipeline, and for other purposes.
- Nicknames: Federal Lands Right-of-Way Act
- Enacted by: the 93rd United States Congress
- Effective: November 16, 1973

Citations
- Public law: 93-153
- Statutes at Large: 87 Stat. 576

Codification
- Titles amended: 30 U.S.C.: Mineral Lands and Mining
- U.S.C. sections amended: 30 U.S.C. ch. 3A § 185

Legislative history
- Introduced in the Senate as S. 1081 by Henry M. Jackson (D-WA) on March 1, 1973; Committee consideration by Senate Interior and Insular Affairs; Passed the Senate on July 17, 1973 (77-20); Passed the House on August 2, 1973 (356-60, in lieu of H.R. 9130); Reported by the joint conference committee on November 7, 1973; agreed to by the House on November 12, 1973 (361-14) and by the Senate on November 13, 1973 (80-5); Signed into law by President Richard Nixon on November 16, 1973

The Trans-Alaska Pipeline Authorization Act of 1973 is a United States federal law signed by US President Richard Nixon on November 16, 1973, that authorized the building of an oil pipeline connecting the North Slope of Alaska to Port Valdez. Specifically, it halted all legal challenges, which were filed primarily by environmental activists, against the construction of the pipeline. In accordance with Nixon's request, the act contains no amendments allowing for federal and state agencies such as the Environmental Protection Agency, the Alaska Department of Natural Resources, or the Alaska Department of Fish and Game to regulate the construction of the pipeline.

== Political support ==
The act was supported by Alaska's congressmen, Don Young, Ted Stevens and Mike Gravel; however, since they all lacked major seniority, the act was introduced by long-time Washington Senator Henry M. Jackson.

== Resolving the 1973 oil crisis ==
The act partially helped in solving the world-wide 1973 oil crisis.

The act is found in Title 43, Section 1651 of the United States Code (43 U.S.C. § 1651). The Trans-Alaska Pipeline System was eventually built as a result of the act.
