= William A. Egan =

American politician (1914–1984)

Bill Egan
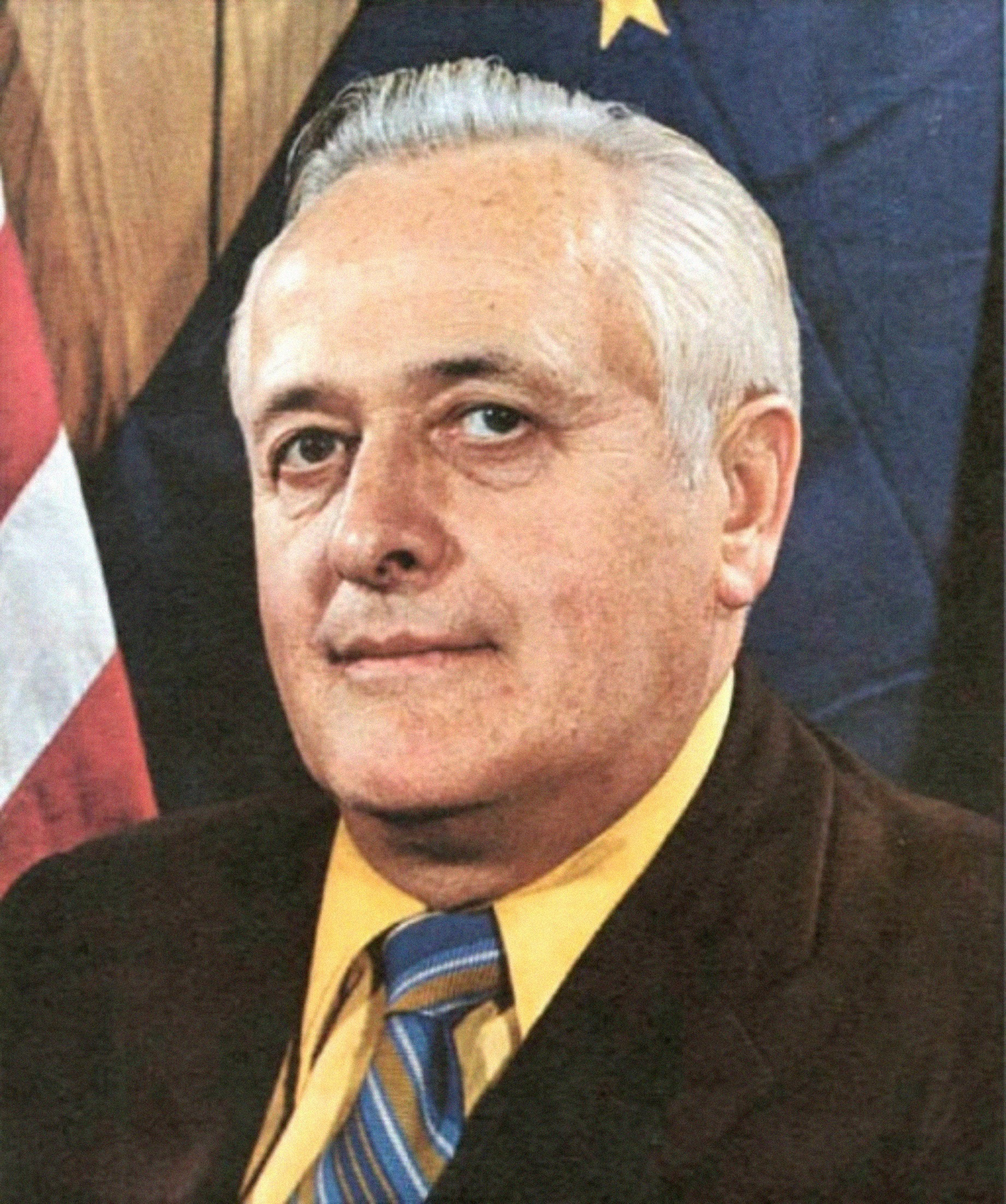
- Egan in 1973

1st Governor of Alaska
- In office December 7, 1970 – December 2, 1974
- Lieutenant: H. A. Boucher
- Preceded by: Keith Miller
- Succeeded by: Jay Hammond
- In office January 3, 1959 – December 5, 1966
- Lieutenant: Hugh Wade
- Preceded by: Waino Hendrickson (as Territorial Governor)
- Succeeded by: Wally Hickel

United States Shadow Senator from the Alaska Territory
- In office October 6, 1956 – January 3, 1959
- Preceded by: Seat established
- Succeeded by: Bob Bartlett (U.S. Senator)

Personal details
- Born: William Allen Egan; October 8, 1914 Valdez, Territory of Alaska, U.S.
- Died: May 6, 1984 (aged 69) Anchorage, Alaska, U.S.
- Party: Democratic
- Spouse: Neva McKittrick (1940–1984)
- Children: 2, including Dennis
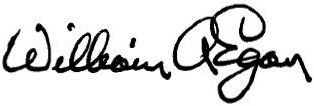
- Signature

Military service
- Allegiance: United States
- Branch/service: United States Army
- Battles/wars: World War II

William Allen Egan (October 8, 1914 – May 6, 1984) was an American Democratic politician. He served as the first governor of Alaska from January 3, 1959, to 1966 and 1970 to 1974, as well as a shadow US senator from Alaska Territory from 1956 to 1959. Born in Valdez, Alaska, Egan is one of only two governors in the state's history (along with Bill Walker) to have been born in Alaska. He was the Democratic nominee in the first five gubernatorial elections (1958, 1962, 1966, 1970, and 1974).

== Early childhood and adulthood ==
The child of a working-class mining family of six children in Valdez, Egan was raised by his mother, Cora (Allen), following his father William's death in an avalanche in 1920. By age 10, Egan was working in a local cannery, helping to support his struggling family. Thanks to the lack of driving laws in the Alaska Territory during the 1920s, Egan learned to drive at an early age, shuttling tourists around during summer months. By the age of 14, Egan was driving dump trucks for the Alaska Road Commission. Following his graduation as a valedictorian from Valdez High School in 1932, he began an interest in politics.

Egan's godfather, Anthony Dimond, a local Valdez lawyer, two-time mayor and member of the Alaska Senate, ran as a Democrat for the territory's nonvoting delegate to the U.S. House of Representatives the same year. Despite the position's inability to vote due to Tennessee Plan, a nonvoting delegate could address other House members and lobby for both bills and statehood. Dimond won the race, introducing the young Egan, who viewed Dimond as his mentor, to territorial and federal politics. Dimond would send copies of the Congressional Record back to Egan in Valdez for him to read.

== Political career ==
Following on his godfather's footsteps, Egan ran successfully as the Democratic candidate from Valdez in the Alaska Territorial House of Representatives in 1940, a post he would hold until 1945. He won three more terms to the House from 1947 to 1953. On November 16, 1940, Egan married Desdia Neva McKittrick (October 3, 1914 – January 19, 2011), a recent arrival to Valdez from Kansas. They had one child, a son, Dennis. During World War II, where Alaska's own Aleutian Islands saw bloody combat between American and Imperial Japanese forces, Egan continued his political career. While still serving in the House of Representatives, Egan was elected as Mayor of Valdez in 1946. In 1953, Egan was elected to the Alaska Territorial Senate, and, in 1956, he was elected Territorial Shadow Senator, serving alongside Ernest Gruening.

=== Alaska's Constitutional Convention ===
Following the end of the war, the Territory of Alaska's political and geographical isolation was coming to an end. The construction of the Alaska Highway now linked the territory to the Lower 48 states and Canada, plus an increased military presence due to the Cold War with the neighboring Soviet Union had also brought the territory closer to the rest of North America.

In 1955, the Alaska Legislature ordered the creation of a constitutional convention to seek a state constitution suitable for Congressional approval. The convention met at the University of Alaska Fairbanks campus in November. Territorial Senator Egan was chosen to lead the body in drafting a new state document. Following the end of the convention a year later, the Alaska Constitution was sent to Alaskans as part of a referendum in 1958, passing easily. The statehood issue was turned over to the U.S. Congress later that year, passing by only one vote. President Dwight Eisenhower signed the resulting Alaska Statehood Act into law. Alaska was to become the 49th state.

=== Governorship ===
Alaska was scheduled to become a U.S. state on January 3, 1959. Egan decided to run to become Alaska's first state governor. He won the race, becoming governor upon the state's admission. During his first governorship, Egan supervised the transition of Alaska's territorial bureaucracy into a state government. Egan also encouraged investment in the newest U.S. state, noting its slowly growing oil and tourist industries. During the 1964 Good Friday earthquake, which remains one of the strongest earthquakes of the modern era, Egan supervised and directed the state's response to the disaster.

Defeated for re-election in 1966, Egan was elected again in 1970, serving a third term until his final defeat in 1974. The discovery of oil at Prudhoe Bay in 1968 and the 1973 Oil Crisis in response to the Yom Kippur War played a large role in Egan's last term, as demand for oil increasingly played a role in the state's politics. In late 1973, President Richard Nixon signed the Trans-Alaska Pipeline Authorization Act, an act to reduce American dependence on OPEC oil. Many environmentalist politicians in the state bitterly opposed this federal legislation. Egan was defeated for re-election in 1974 by Jay Hammond, in one of 4 Republican gubernatorial flips that year.

== Later life ==
Following Egan's departure from the governorship in 1974, Egan retired from public and political life. He died 10 years following leaving office on May 6, 1984, at the age of 69 from lung cancer. His son, Dennis Egan, served as the mayor of Juneau, Alaska from 1995 to 2000, and as a state senator from 2009 to 2019.

== Legacy ==
- Egan was awarded as "Alaskan of the Year" in 1971, and received an honorary Doctor of Laws degree the following year from the University of Alaska.
- October 8 is now William Egan Day in Alaska.
- The William A. Egan Civic & Convention Center in Anchorage is named in his honor.
- Egan Drive in Juneau is also named in his honor.
- Egan Drive in Valdez, Alaska
- Egan Library, University of Alaska Southeast, Juneau, AK is named in his honor.

== See also ==
- List of mayors of Valdez, Alaska

Political offices
Preceded by Stanley McCutcheon	Speaker of the Alaska House of Representatives; 1951–1953	Succeeded by George Miscovich
Preceded by Waino Hendrickson; Acting	Governor of Alaska; 1959–1966	Succeeded by Wally Hickel
Preceded by Keith Miller	Governor of Alaska; 1970–1974	Succeeded by Jay Hammond
U.S. Senate
New seat	U.S. Shadow Senator (Class 2) from the Alaska Territory; 1956–1959; Served alongside: Ernest Gruening	Succeeded by Bob Bartlett as U.S. Senator
Party political offices
First	Democratic nominee for Governor of Alaska; 1958, 1962, 1966, 1970, 1974	Succeeded by Chancy Croft
