= Wally Hickel =

American politician (1919–2010)

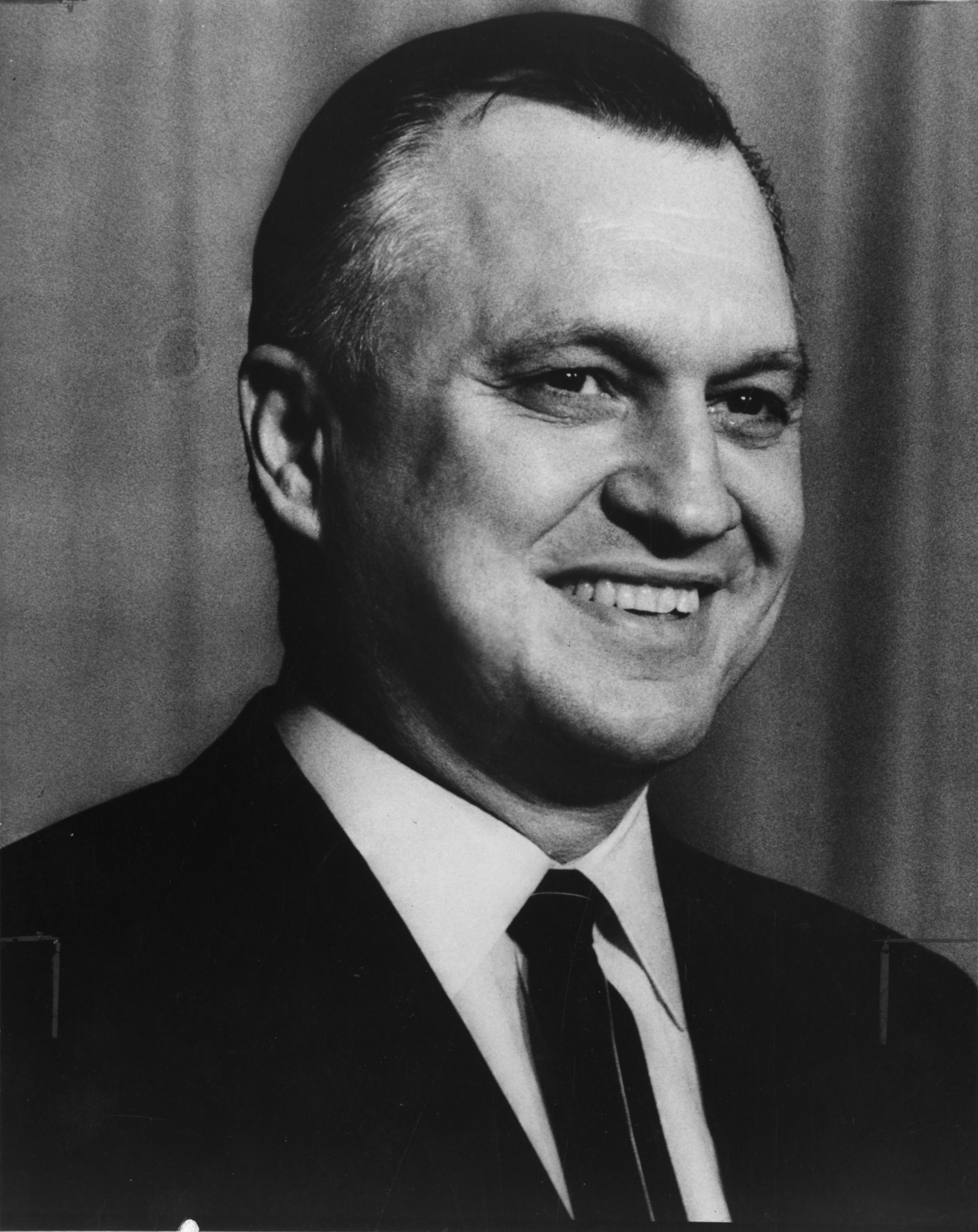
- Hickel in 1969

2nd Governor of Alaska
- In office December 3, 1990 – December 5, 1994
- Lieutenant: Jack Coghill
- Preceded by: Steve Cowper
- Succeeded by: Tony Knowles
- In office December 5, 1966 – January 29, 1969
- Lieutenant: Keith Harvey Miller
- Preceded by: William A. Egan
- Succeeded by: Keith Harvey Miller

38th United States Secretary of the Interior
- In office January 24, 1969 – November 25, 1970
- President: Richard Nixon
- Preceded by: Stewart Udall
- Succeeded by: Rogers Morton

Personal details
- Born: Walter Joseph Hickel; August 18, 1919 Ellinwood, Kansas, U.S.
- Died: May 7, 2010 (aged 90) Anchorage, Alaska, U.S.
- Resting place: Anchorage Memorial Park
- Party: Republican (before 1990, 1994–2010); Alaska Independence (1990–1994)
- Spouses: Janice Sheppard Cannon (m. 1941; died 1943) Ermalee Strutz (m. 1945)
- Children: 6

Military service
- Allegiance: United States
- Branch/service: United States Army; Army Air Corps
- Battles/wars: World War II

Walter Joseph Hickel (August 18, 1919 – May 7, 2010) was an American businessman, real estate developer, and politician who served as the second governor of Alaska from 1966 to 1969 and 1990 to 1994, as well as U.S. Secretary of the Interior from 1969 to 1970. He worked as a construction worker and eventually became a construction company operator during Alaska's territorial days. Following World War II, Hickel became heavily involved with real estate development, building residential subdivisions, shopping centers and hotels. Hickel entered politics in the 1950s during Alaska's battle for statehood and remained politically active for the rest of his life.

Hickel served as the second governor of Alaska, defeating incumbent and first governor William A. Egan in 1966. He served as governor until 1969, ending with his resignation upon his appointment to the position of United States Secretary of the Interior in the cabinet of President Richard Nixon. Hickel later served a full term as governor from 1990 to 1994 under the banner of the Alaskan Independence Party.

== Early life and career ==
Hickel was born in 1919 in Ellinwood, Kansas, the son of Emma Pauline (Zecha) and Robert Anton Hickel. He grew up on his parents' Dust Bowl tenant farm during the Great Depression near Claflin, Kansas. In October 1940 he moved to Alaska and traveled to it aboard the S.S. Yukon with 95 other passengers and went into the local real estate industry. Seven years later in 1947 he had founded a successful construction company.

Hickel joined Democrats in calling for Alaskan statehood during the late 1940s and into the 1950s. In 1958, the Alaska Statehood Act was signed into law by President Dwight D. Eisenhower.

== Political career ==
=== 1950s ===
By the 1950s, he was the finance chairman of the Republican Party and, in 1952, received the backing of businessmen in Anchorage for the territorial governorship, but Benjamin Heintzleman was appointed instead. In 1953, Hickel along with the national committeewoman for Alaska, the vice chairman for the territorial party and his wife went to the Republican Party's western conference in San Francisco and was later elected as head of the Anchorage Republican Club. In December 1953, he and eighteen other prominent Republicans from Anchorage sent a letter to Governor Heintzleman requesting the resignation of Robert DeArmond and that he be replaced with somebody from Anchorage, and they later telegrammed Secretary of the Interior Douglas McKay asking him to build up the party and also asked Heintzleman to reconsider his decision to cancel his meeting with them.

=== First governorship ===
Hickel was elected as Alaska's second governor in the 1966 state general elections, defeating his Democratic rival and incumbent governor Bill Egan. Hickel's first governorship, the second in the young state's history as well as Alaska's first Republican governorship, oversaw the discovery of oilfields at Prudhoe Bay in 1968, a factor that would prove politically decisive in later years. Hickel, a moderate Republican and environmentalist, did not push for heavy oil exploitation. Nevertheless, during his first few months in office, his administration approved the sale of oil leases on 37,000 acres of the North Slope despite opposition from Alaskan Natives. In November 1968, Hickel's department of transportation began construction on a 400-mile road from Livengood to Prudhoe Bay that would later be known as the Hickel Highway. The same year, Hickel appointed Ted Stevens to the United States Senate to replace the recently deceased Bob Bartlett.

Like his predecessor Egan, Hickel sought to improve relations with Alaskan Natives in seeking resolutions on Native land claims. A group of Native Americans from Interior Alaska, including Morris Thompson and Don and Jules Wright, played major roles in his 1966 campaign and subsequent governorship.

=== Interior secretary ===
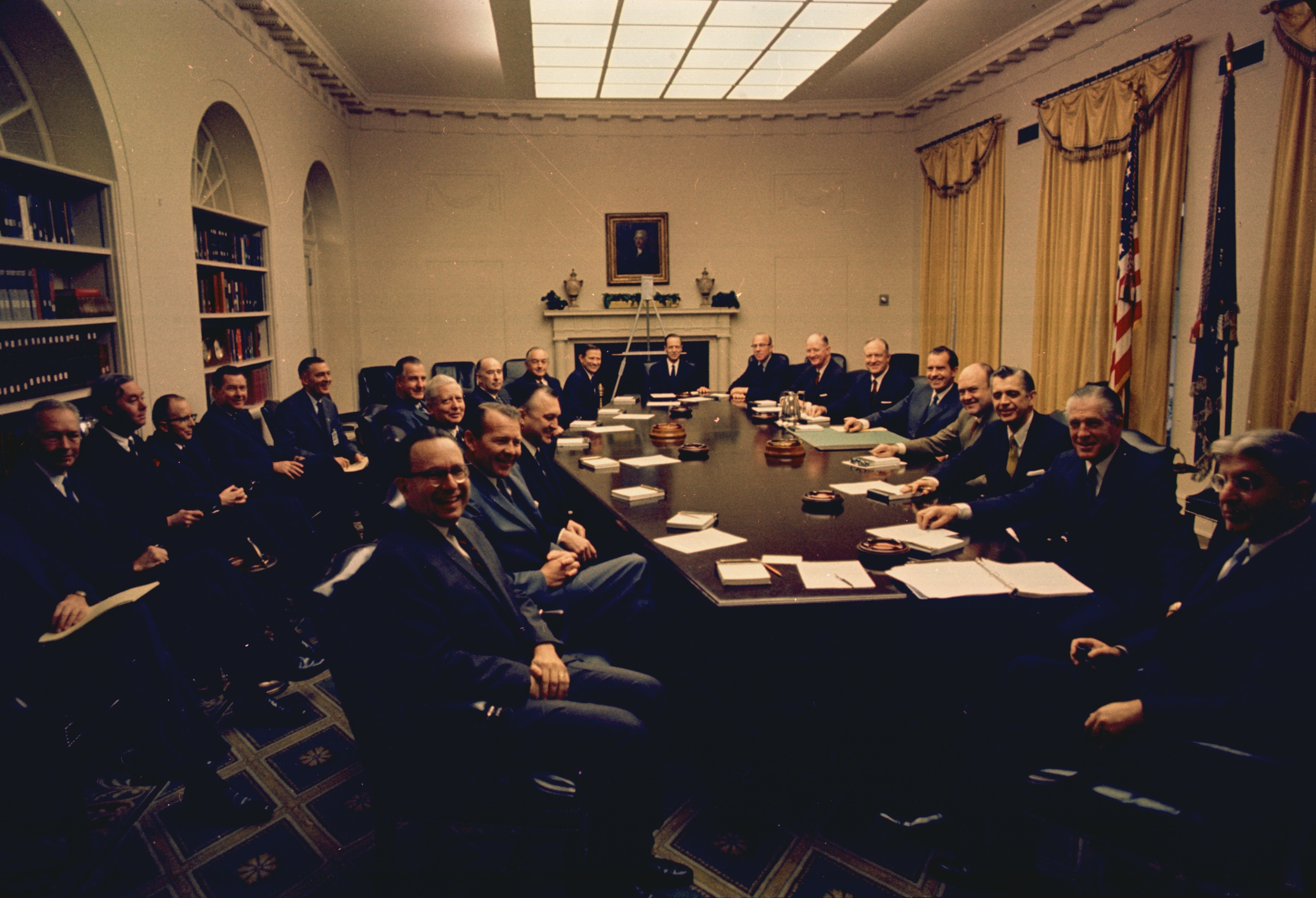
The Nixon cabinet poses for a photograph, days after Nixon's inauguration as president. Hickel is slightly left of center.

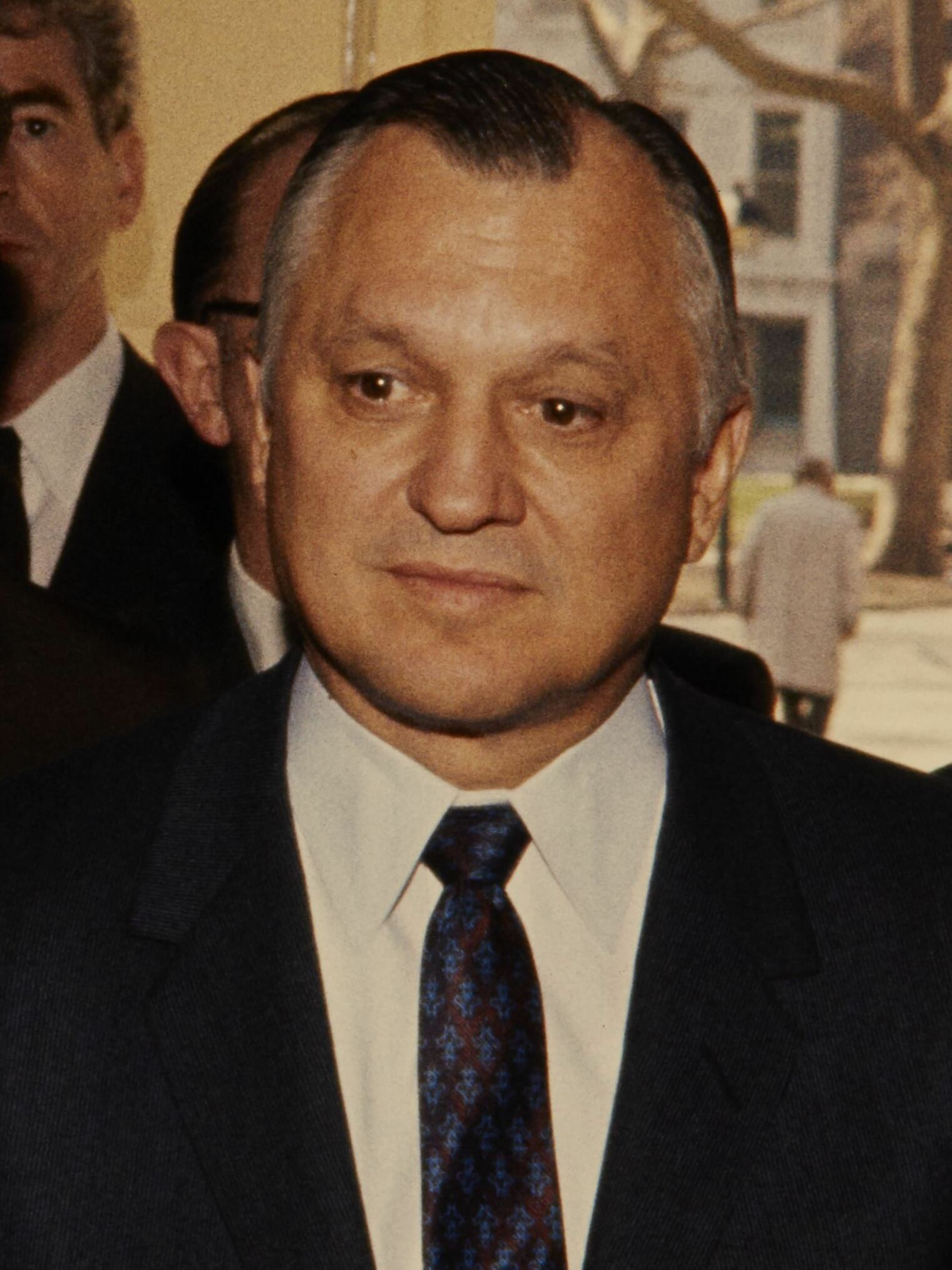
Hickel in 1970

Richard Nixon's election as U.S. President in late 1968 led to an offer to Hickel from the President-elect to serve in the United States Cabinet as Interior Secretary. Initially, Hickel declined the cabinet offer. Nixon replied that his decision was final. Hickel would recall years later that he cried afterward and announced that he would be resigning from the governorship to go to Washington.

Hickel's nomination was met with what he later wrote was a newspaper "smear" campaign of false and "crazy accusations" that he had a corrupt and anti-environmentalist record as governor. Opposition to his nomination was led by influential columnists Drew Pearson and Jack Anderson. Newspapers opposing his nomination included the New York Times and the Los Angeles Times. In the Senate, his confirmation was opposed by, among others, Democratic senators Walter Mondale and George McGovern. Sierra Club director David Brower testified in opposition to Hickel. The Senate nevertheless confirmed his nomination on 23 January 1969.

Upon becoming the federal Secretary of the Interior, Hickel proved to be a strong environmentalist, supporting strong legislation that put liabilities on oil companies operating offshore oil rigs as well as demanding environmental safeguards on Alaska's growing oil industry.

Hickel's centrist voice inside the Nixon Administration eventually led to confrontations with the President. In 1970 following the shooting of college students at Kent State University by the Ohio National Guard, Hickel wrote a letter critical of Nixon's Vietnam War policy and urging him to give more respect to the views of young people critical of the war, writing in part, "I believe this administration finds itself today embracing a philosophy which appears to lack appropriate concern for the attitude of a great mass of Americans – our young people." That dissent garnered worldwide media attention, and on November 25, 1970, Hickel was fired over the letter. Days before he lost the office, Hickel had told CBS' 60 Minutes that he would not quit under pressure and that he would go away only "with an arrow in my heart, not a bullet in my back." Hickel's undersecretaries, such as Leslie Glasgow, who was in charge of Fish, Wildlife, Parks, and Marine Resources, were also dismissed. After less than two years in Washington, Glasgow returned to Louisiana State University in Baton Rouge, where he was a professor with expertise in the study of wildlife in the marshes.

=== Second governorship ===
A blanket primary held on August 28, 1990, resulted in Arliss Sturgulewski, a member of the Alaska Senate from Anchorage since 1979, winning the Republican nomination for governor of Alaska. Winning the Democratic nomination was Tony Knowles, the immediate past mayor of Anchorage.

The Republicans chose as their nominee for lieutenant governor Jack Coghill, a fellow state senator from Nenana. Coghill had held elected office continuously since 1957 with the exception of relinquishing the mayorship of Nenana for approximately two years, when the 1967 flood forced him to move from the city limits temporarily. Coghill had also briefly worked as a special assistant to Hickel during his first governorship.

Sturgulewski, who won the Republican nomination for the second consecutive time against mostly conservative opposition, was criticized by many Republicans for her positions on issues such as abortion and capital punishment. Following a contentious meeting between Sturgulewski and prominent conservative Republicans held in the home of David Cuddy, Coghill felt that it was impossible to continue to run on the ticket with Sturgulewski. After Coghill met first with Hickel and then with Edgar Paul Boyko, the idea was hatched to run a slate of Hickel and Coghill under the Alaskan Independence Party banner. AIP chairman Joe Vogler was brought from Fairbanks to Anchorage immediately prior to the deadline for political parties to substitute their nominees.

John Lindauer and Jerry Ward, who had been chosen in the primary as the AIP ticket (and would, eight years later, win another blanket primary as the Republican Party's nominees for governor and lieutenant governor), stepped aside, largely alluding to the illness of Lindauer's wife as the reason. Hickel and Coghill prevailed in the general election.

Although he had common ground with the Alaskan Independence Party in fighting restrictions on land use imposed by federal environmentalism, Hickel had been one of the most influential historical proponents of Alaska statehood and never endorsed the AIP's secessionism, prompting some party faithful to petition for his recall. He rejoined the Republican Party in April 1994, near the end of his term.

Hickel wanted to build a water pipeline from Alaska to California in 1991.

== Business career ==
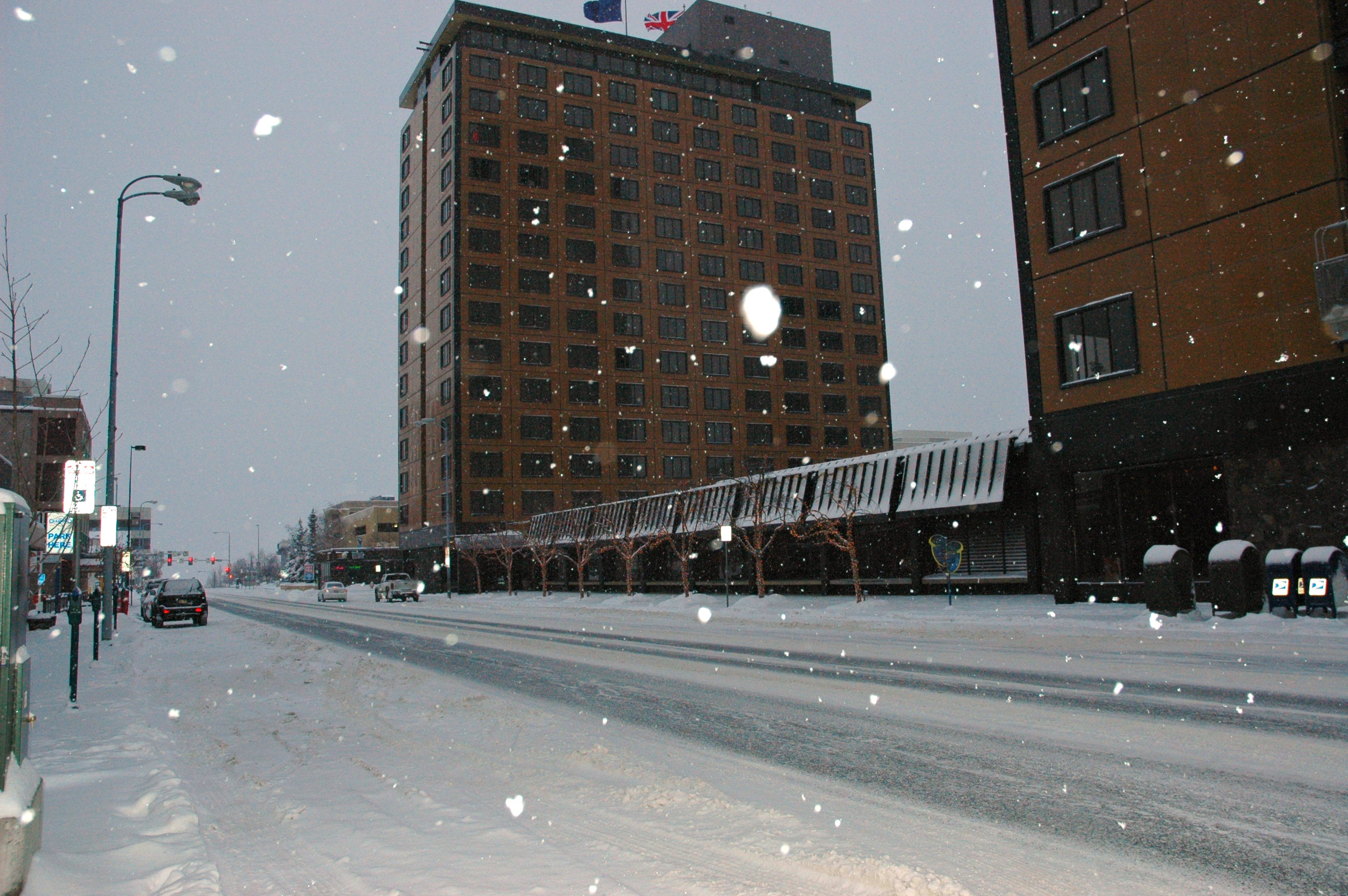
The Hotel Captain Cook in December 2008, looking westerly from the corner of Fifth Avenue and I Street. Hickel's office was located on the second floor, immediately to the right of the camera position.

Wally Hickel was a prominent real estate developer and successful businessman, with a focus on hotels and shopping centers. As chairman of the Hickel Investment Company, he oversaw the construction and operation of numerous properties, including those built to house Safeway's initial stores in Alaska.

In 1964, Hickel decided to build a high-rise luxury hotel in downtown Anchorage following the devastating 1964 Alaska earthquake. Despite skepticism that the area could not be redeveloped extensively, he chose a site close to one of the largest landslides in the area as a show of confidence in the city's future. The result was the Hotel Captain Cook, a nine-story luxury hotel that opened in 1965 on Fourth Avenue, adjacent to the historic Wendler Building.

Hickel's confidence in the project was not misplaced, as the hotel grew to become a major landmark in Anchorage. A fifteen-story tower was added in 1972, followed by an eighteen-story tower in 1978. Today, the Hotel Captain Cook covers almost an entire city block and includes a connected parking garage covering another half-block. The hotel is a member of Historic Hotels of America, an official program of the National Trust for Historic Preservation.

Overall, Hickel's business career was marked by a commitment to development that balanced economic growth with environmental responsibility. His success as a businessman provided him with the resources and platform to pursue public service and activism, where he continued to advocate for sustainable development and environmental protection.

== Later life ==
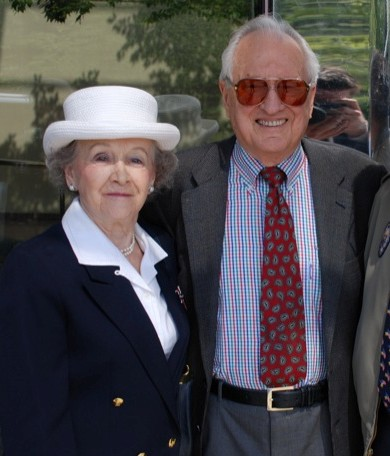
Wally Hickel and his wife, Ermalee Hickel, outside the Egan Center in Anchorage in 2008.

In 2006 he supported Sarah Palin in her bid to become governor of Alaska; however, in 2009, he stated that he didn't "give a damn what she does".

In 2008, he called for the resignation of U.S. Senator Ted Stevens, whom he had appointed to the Senate in 1968. His statement was made in light of the August 2008 federal indictment of Stevens related to the alleged receipt of improper gifts from Bill Allen, CEO of the VECO Corporation, an Alaskan construction company heavily involved in the Alaskan oil industry. Stevens was found guilty by a Washington D.C. jury of seven felonies in October 2008, narrowly losing his November election to Democrat Mark Begich, eight days later. Stevens' conviction was later set aside by the federal trial judge over the issue of prosecutorial misconduct. The Justice Department under Eric Holder declined to refile charges against the ex-Senator.

== Death ==
Hickel died on May 7, 2010, in Anchorage, Alaska. In keeping with his often-stated wish, he was buried in Anchorage Memorial Park, standing up, facing east towards Washington, D.C.

== See also ==
- List of governors of Alaska
- Ermalee Hickel
- Jack Hickel

== Bibliography ==
- Hickel, Walter J. (1971). Who Owns America?. Englewood Cliffs: Prentice-Hall. ISBN 013958322X. 328 pp.
- Roberts, Malcolm B., ed. (1990). Going Up In Flames. (Hickel with numerous collaborators including Robert B. Atwood, Irene Ryan and Mead Treadwell; authorship credited to the Commonwealth North Federal-State Relations Committee). Anchorage: Alaska Pacific University Press for Commonwealth North. ISBN 0-935094-15-6. 132 pp.
- Roberts, Malcolm B., ed. (1994). The Wit and Wisdom of Wally Hickel. Anchorage: Searchers Press. ISBN 0-9644316-0-2. 239 pp.
- Hickel, Walter J. (2002). Crisis in the Commons: The Alaska Solution. Oakland/Anchorage: Institute for Contemporary Studies in association with the Institute of the North. ISBN 1-55815-521-X. 290 pp.

Party political offices
Preceded by Mike Stepovich	Republican nominee for Governor of Alaska; 1966	Succeeded by Keith Harvey Miller
Preceded by John Lindauer	Alaskan Independence nominee for Governor of Alaska; 1990	Succeeded by Jack Coghill
Political offices
Preceded by William A. Egan	Governor of Alaska; 1966–1969	Succeeded by Keith Harvey Miller
Preceded by Stewart Udall	United States Secretary of the Interior; 1969–1970	Succeeded by Rogers Morton
Preceded by Steve Cowper	Governor of Alaska; 1990–1994	Succeeded by Tony Knowles
