= List of third-party and independent performances in United States elections =

This article contains statistics on third-party and independent performances in US elections and a list of pages containing lists of those elections.

== Lists of third-party and independent performances in United States elections ==
- List of third-party and independent performances in United States presidential elections
- List of third-party and independent performances in United States gubernatorial elections
- List of third-party and independent performances in United States Senate elections
- List of third-party and independent performances in United States House elections
- List of third-party and independent performances in United States state legislative elections

List of third-party and independent performances in Alaska state legislative elections
List of third-party and independent performances in Arkansas state legislative elections
List of third-party and independent performances in Colorado state legislative elections
List of third-party and independent performances in Hawaii state legislative elections
List of third-party and independent performances in Louisiana state legislative elections
List of third-party and independent performances in Montana state legislative elections
List of third-party and independent performances in Utah state legislative elections
List of third-party and independent performances in West Virginia state legislative elections
List of third-party and independent performances in Wyoming state legislative elections

- List of third-party and independent performances in United States mayoral elections

== Notable performances ==
=== Presidential elections ===
The following are third party and independent candidates who received more than 10% of the total popular vote.

| Year | Party | Nominee | Running mate | # Votes | % Votes | % Votes On Ballot | Electoral Votes | Place | Notes |
|---|---|---|---|---|---|---|---|---|---|
| 1912 | Progressive | Theodore Roosevelt | Hiram Johnson | 4,120,609 | 27.39 / 100 | 27.86 / 100 | 88 / 531 | 2nd | |
| 1856 | American | Millard Fillmore | Andrew J. Donelson | 872,703 | 21.54 / 100 | 21.54 / 100 | 8 / 296 | 3rd | |
| 1992 | Independent | Ross Perot | James Stockdale | 19,743,821 | 18.91 / 100 | 18.91 / 100 | 0 / 538 | 3rd | |
| 1860 | Southern Democratic | John C. Breckinridge | Joseph Lane | 851,844 | 18.20 / 100 | 22.04 / 100 | 72 / 303 | 2nd | |
| 1924 | Progressive | Robert M. La Follette | Burton K. Wheeler | 4,833,821 | 16.62 / 100 | 16.69 / 100 | 13 / 531 | 3rd | |
| 1968 | American Independent | George Wallace | Curtis LeMay | 9,901,118 | 13.53 / 100 | 13.56 / 100 | 46 / 538 | 3rd | |
| 1860 | Constitutional Union | John Bell | Edward Everett | 590,946 | 12.62 / 100 | 15.43 / 100 | 39 / 303 | 3rd | |
| 1848 | Free Soil | Martin Van Buren | Charles F. Adams | 291,475 | 10.13 / 100 | 13.79 / 100 | 0 / 290 | 3rd | |

=== Senate elections ===
The following are third party and independent candidates who have won senate seats since 1970.

Notable third-party senatorial performances (1991–2020)
| Year | State | Party | Nominee | # Votes | % Votes | Place | Notes |
|---|---|---|---|---|---|---|---|
| 2024 | Maine | Independent | Angus King | 427,279 | 52.06 / 100 | Re-elected | |
| 2024 | Vermont | Independent | Bernie Sanders | 229,429 | 63.16 / 100 | Re-elected | |
| 2018 | Maine | Independent | Angus King | 344,575 | 54.31 / 100 | Re-elected | |
| 2018 | Vermont | Independent | Bernie Sanders | 183,649 | 67.44 / 100 | Re-elected | |
| 2012 | Maine | Independent | Angus King | 370,580 | 52.89 / 100 | Elected | |
| 2012 | Vermont | Independent | Bernie Sanders | 209,053 | 71.04 / 100 | Re-elected | |
| 2010 | Alaska | Republican (write-in) | Lisa Murkowski | 101,091 | 39.49 / 100 | Re-elected | Lost Republican primary |
| 2006 | Connecticut | Connecticut for Lieberman | Joe Lieberman | 564,095 | 49.71 / 100 | Re-elected | Lost Democratic primary |
| 2006 | Vermont | Independent | Bernie Sanders | 171,638 | 65.41 / 100 | Elected | |
| 1976 | Virginia | Independent | Harry F. Byrd Jr. | 890,778 | 57.2 / 100 | Re-elected | |
| 1970 | Virginia | Independent | Harry F. Byrd Jr. | 506,237 | 53.54 / 100 | Re-elected | |
| 1970 | New York | Conservative | James L. Buckley | 2,288,190 | 38.95 / 100 | Elected | |

=== House elections ===
The following are third party and independent candidates who have received more than 30% of the popular vote since 2008.

Notable third party House performances (2022) – 19 entries
| Year | District | Party | Candidate | # Votes | % Votes | Place |
|---|---|---|---|---|---|---|
| 2026 | Alaska at-large | Independent/Undeclared | Bill Hill | 116,932 | 41.7 / 100 | 2nd |
| 2026 | California 6 | Independent | Kevin Kiley | 110,876 | 41.1 / 100 | 2nd |
| 2026 | Massachusetts 1 | Independent | Nadia Milleron | 93,791 | 34.6 / 100 | 2nd |
| 2024 | Massachusetts 1 | Independent | Nadia Milleron | 88,842 | 36.3 / 100 | 2nd |
| 2024 | Nevada 2 | Independent | Greg Kidd | 139,095 | 36.0 / 100 | 2nd |
| 2024 | Massachusetts 2 | Independent | Cornelius Shea | 87,837 | 31.7 / 100 | 2nd |
| 2024 | North Carolina 6 | Constitution | Kevin Hayes | 103,247 | 30.8 / 100 | 2nd |
| 2022 | North Dakota At-large | Independent | Cara Mund | 89,644 | 37.6 / 100 | 2nd |
| 2022 | Texas 26 | Libertarian | Mike Kolls | 81,208 | 30.7 / 100 | 2nd |
| 2020 | Alaska At-large | Independent/Undeclared | Alyse Galvin (Note: Also listed as the de facto Democratic nominee.) | 159,856 | 45.3 / 100 | 2nd |
| 2018 | Alaska At-large | Independent/Undeclared | Alyse Galvin | 109,615 | 45.84 / 100 | 2nd |
| 2016 | Northern Mariana Islands At-large | Independent | Gregorio Sablan | 10,605 | 100.0 / 100 | Elected |
| 2016 | Arizona 8 | Green | Mark Salazar | 93,954 | 31.43 / 100 | 2nd |
| 2014 | Northern Mariana Islands At-large | Independent | Gregorio Sablan | 8,549 | 65.29 / 100 | Elected |
| 2012 | Puerto Rico At-large | New Progressive | Pedro Pierluisi | 905,066 | 48.44 / 100 | Elected |
| 2012 | Puerto Rico At-large | Popular Democratic | Rafael Cox Alomar | 881,181 | 47.16 / 100 | 2nd |
| 2012 | California 33 | Independent | Bill Bloomfield | 146,660 | 46.04 / 100 | 2nd |
| 2012 | Kansas 3 | Independent | Joel Balam | 92,675 | 31.55 / 100 | 2nd |
| 2008 | American Samoa At-large | Independent | Eni Faleomavaega | 7,498 | 60.38 / 100 | Elected |
| 2008 | Puerto Rico At-large | New Progressive | Pedro Pierluisi | 1,010,285 | 53.05 / 100 | Elected |
| 2008 | New York 23 | Conservative | Doug Hoffman | 69,553 | 45.98 / 100 | 2nd |
| 2008 | Puerto Rico At-large | Popular Democratic | Alfredo Salazar Jr. | 810,093 | 42.54 / 100 | 2nd |
| 2008 | American Samoa At-large | Independent | Amata Coleman Radewagen | 4,349 | 35.02 / 100 | 2nd |

=== Gubernatorial elections ===
The following are third party and independent candidates who have won governerships since 1990.

Notable third party gubernatorial performances
| Year | State | Party | Nominee | Running mate | # Votes | % Votes | Place |
|---|---|---|---|---|---|---|---|
| 2014 | Alaska | Independent | Bill Walker | Byron Mallott | 134,658 | 48.1 / 100 | Elected |
| 2014 | Rhode Island | | | | | | |
| 2010 | Rhode Island | Independent | Lincoln Chafee | | 123,571 | 36.1 / 100 | Elected |
| 1998 | Maine | Independent | Angus King | | 246,772 | 58.61 / 100 | Re-elected |
| 1998 | Minnesota | Reform | Jesse Ventura | Mae Schunk | 773,713 | 36.99 / 100 | Elected |
| 1994 | Maine | Independent | Angus King | | 180,829 | 35.37 / 100 | Elected |
| 1990 | Alaska | Alaskan Independence | Wally Hickel | Jack Coghill | 75,721 | 38.88 / 100 | Elected |
| 1990 | Connecticut | A Connecticut Party | Lowell Weicker | Eunice Groark | 460,576 | 40.36 / 100 | Elected |

=== Other state constitutional offices ===
This list includes state constitutional offices apart from governorships. This table shows candidates who have gotten at or more than 5% of the total vote. Candidates must run solely on a third party line to be included.

==== Lieutenant governors ====
To be included in the table the candidate must run separately from the governor.

| Year | State | Party | Nominee | # Votes | % Votes | Place |
|---|---|---|---|---|---|---|
| 2020 | Washington | Write-in | Various (Note: Most Write-ins are thought to have gone for candidate Joshua Freed, who ran a write-in campaign. However, the election report does not separate the write-in votes by candidate.) | 759,076 | 20.88 / 100 | 3rd of 3 (Note: Write-in candidates combined received 20.88% of the total vote behind Democratic nominees Denny Heck and Marko Liias.) |
| 2022 | Alabama | Libertarian | Ruth Page-Nelson | 178,660 | 15.6 / 100 | 2nd of 2 (Note: The only other candidate in the race was a Republican.) |
| 2022 | Idaho | Constitution | Pro-Life | 29,989 | 5.13 / 100 | 3rd of 3 |
| 2022 | Rhode Island | Independent | Ross McCurdy | 19,507 | 5.5 / 100 | 3rd of 3 |
| 2026 | Arkansas | Libertarian | Michael Kalagias | 303,013 | 36.1 / 100 | 2nd of 2 (Note: The only other candidate in the race was a Republican.) |

==== State attorneys general ====
| Year | State | Party | Nominee | # Votes | % Votes | Place |
|---|---|---|---|---|---|---|
| 2024 | Utah | United Utah | Michelle Quist | 103,831 | 7.16 / 100 | 3rd of 5 |
| 2022 | Nebraska | Legal Marijuana Now | Larry Bolinger | 188,649 | 30.3 / 100 | 2nd of 2 (Note: The only other candidate in the race was a Republican.) |
| 2022 | Oklahoma | Libertarian | Lynda Steele | 281,923 | 26.24 / 100 | 2nd of 2 (Note: The only other candidate in the race was a Republican.) |
| 2020 | Utah | Libertarian | Rudy Bautista | 82,444 | 5.68 / 100 | 3rd of 3 |
| 2018 | Iowa | Libertarian (Write-in) | Marco Battaglia | 262,131 | 22.8 / 100 | 2nd of 2 (Note: The only other candidate in the race was a Democrat.) |
| 2018 | Rhode Island | Compassion | Alan Gordon | 65,674 | 19.1 / 100 | 2nd of 2 (Note: The only other candidate in the race was a Democrat.) |
| 2016 | Utah | Libertarian | Andrew McCullough | 73,973 | 6.73 / 100 | 3rd of 4 |
| 2016 | Washington | Libertarian | Joshua Trumbull | 979,105 | 32.86 / 100 | 2nd of 2 (Note: The only other candidate in the race was a Democrat.) |
| 2014 | Arkansas | Libertarian | Aaron Cash | 43,245 | 5.2 / 100 | 3rd of 3 |
| 2014 | Colorado | Libertarian | David K. Williams | 120,745 | 6 / 100 | 3rd of 3 |
| 2014 | Nevada | American Independent | Jonathan Hansen | 30,513 | 5.6 / 100 | 3rd of 4 |
| 2012 | Utah | Libertarian | Andrew McCullough | 47,347 | 5.3 / 100 | 3rd of 3 |
| 2008 | Vermont | Vermont Progressive | Charlotte Dennett | 17,730 | 6 / 100 | 3rd of 4 |
| 2002 | Vermont | Vermont Progressive | Cindy Hill | 16,152 | 7.3 / 100 | 3rd of 6 |
| 1974 | Vermont | Liberty Union | Nancy Kaufman | 8,296 | 6.1 / 100 | 3rd of 3 |
| 1965 | Virginia | Conservative (Virginia) | John W. Carter | 80,542 | 13.6 / 100 | 3rd of 3 |
| 1954 | California | Prohibition | Edwin M. Copper | 204,171 | 5.5 / 100 | 2nd of 2 (Note: The only other candidate in the race was a Democrat.) |
| 1942 | Minnesota | Farmer-Labor (Minnesota) | David J. Erickson | 187,074 | 25.48 / 100 | 2nd of 3 |
| 1940 | Minnesota | Farmer-Labor (Minnesota) | David J. Erickson | 284,337 | 24.35 / 100 | 2nd of 3 |
| 1938 | Minnesota | Farmer-Labor (Minnesota) | William Ervin | 378,385 | 35.56 / 100 | Lost re-election 2nd |
| 1938 | California | Write-in | Carl Kegley | 463,682 | 19.9 / 100 | 2nd of 4 (Note: The only other candidate in the race was a Republican.) |
| 1938 | California | Townsend | Walter Emmett Barry | 231,914 | 9.9 / 100 | 3rd of 4 (Note: The only other candidate in the race was a Republican.) |
| 1936 | Minnesota | Farmer-Labor (Minnesota) | Harry H. Peterson | 530,815 | 49.62 / 100 | Reelected |
| 1934 | Minnesota | Farmer-Labor (Minnesota) | Harry H. Peterson | 436,140 | 44.89 / 100 | Reelected |
| 1934 | California | Prohibition | Errol O. Shour | 396,852 | 19.3 / 100 | 2nd of 2 (Note: The only other candidate in the race was a Republican.) |
| 1932 | Minnesota | Farmer-Labor (Minnesota) | Harry H. Peterson | 379,418 | 39.87 / 100 | Elected |
| 1924 | Colorado | Farmer-Labor | Bertram B. Beshoar | 17,200 | 5 / 100 | 3rd of 5 |
| 1914 | Vermont | Bull Moose (Progressive) | Ernest W. Gibson | 7,111 | 12.1 / 100 | 3rd of 5 |
| 1914 | California | Bull Moose (Progressive) | U. S. Webb | 639,804 | 78.2 / 100 | Elected (Note: Later when Webb ran for reelection, Webb ran as a Republican.) |
| 1914 | California | Socialist | Walter R. Dunn | 96,678 | 11.8 / 100 | 2nd of 3 |
| 1914 | California | Prohibition | James H. Blanchard | 81,274 | 9.9 / 100 | 3rd of 3 |
| 1912 | Vermont | Bull Moose (Progressive) | Richard A. Hoar | 14,214 | 23.1 / 100 | 3rd of 5 |

== Statistics ==
Note: Prior to the passage of the 17th Amendment in 1913, most states did not hold direct elections to the Senate.

| Legend: | 1st | 2nd | 3rd |

Elections with notable third party electoral performances (1900–present)
| State | Gubernatorial elections | | | Senate elections | | | Total elections | | |
| State | Threshold reached | Threshold candidates | Third party victory | Threshold reached | Threshold candidates | Third party victory | Threshold reached | Threshold candidates | Third party victory |
|---|---|---|---|---|---|---|---|---|---|
| Alabama | 5 | 6 | 0 | 4 | 4 | 0 | 9 | 10 | 0 |
| Alaska | 9 | 10 | 2 | 6 | 6 | 1 | 15 | 16 | 3 |
| Arizona | 5 | 5 | 0 | 7 | 11 | 0 | 12 | 16 | 0 |
| Arkansas | 10 | 11 | 0 | 6 | 6 | 1 | 16 | 17 | 1 |
| California | 8 | 10 | 1 | 9 | 11 | 0 | 17 | 21 | 1 |
| Colorado | 4 | 6 | 0 | 4 | 5 | 0 | 8 | 11 | 0 |
| Connecticut | 7 | 9 | 1 | 4 | 4 | 1 | 11 | 13 | 2 |
| Delaware | 2 | 2 | 0 | 1 | 1 | 0 | 3 | 3 | 0 |
| Florida | 3 | 3 | 1 | 3 | 3 | 0 | 6 | 6 | 1 |
| Georgia | 4 | 4 | 0 | 2 | 2 | 0 | 6 | 6 | 0 |
| Hawaii | 3 | 3 | 0 | 2 | 2 | 0 | 5 | 5 | 0 |
| Idaho | 13 | 16 | 0 | 4 | 5 | 0 | 17 | 21 | 0 |
| Illinois | 4 | 5 | 0 | 2 | 2 | 0 | 6 | 7 | 0 |
| Indiana | 2 | 4 | 0 | 4 | 4 | 0 | 6 | 8 | 0 |
| Iowa | 1 | 1 | 0 | 1 | 1 | 0 | 2 | 2 | 0 |
| Kansas | 7 | 8 | 0 | 5 | 6 | 0 | 12 | 14 | 0 |
| Kentucky | 2 | 2 | 0 | 0 | 0 | 0 | 2 | 2 | 0 |
| Louisiana | 3 | 3 | 0 | 2 | 2 | 0 | 5 | 5 | 0 |
| Maine | 13 | 18 | 3 | 5 | 5 | 2 | 18 | 23 | 5 |
| Maryland | 1 | 1 | 0 | 3 | 3 | 0 | 4 | 4 | 0 |
| Massachusetts | 10 | 10 | 0 | 4 | 4 | 0 | 14 | 14 | 0 |
| Michigan | 2 | 2 | 0 | 0 | 0 | 0 | 2 | 2 | 0 |
| Minnesota | 21 | 25 | 5 | 19 | 22 | 5 | 40 | 47 | 10 |
| Mississippi | 2 | 2 | 0 | 4 | 4 | 0 | 6 | 6 | 0 |
| Missouri | 1 | 1 | 0 | 1 | 1 | 0 | 2 | 2 | 0 |
| Nebraska | 10 | 10 | 1 | 4 | 5 | 1 | 14 | 15 | 2 |
| Nevada | 6 | 7 | 2 | 7 | 8 | 0 | 13 | 15 | 2 |
| New Hampshire | 4 | 4 | 0 | 1 | 1 | 0 | 5 | 5 | 0 |
| New Jersey | 2 | 2 | 0 | 0 | 0 | 0 | 2 | 2 | 0 |
| New Mexico | 2 | 2 | 0 | 1 | 1 | 0 | 3 | 3 | 0 |
| New York | 11 | 12 | 0 | 8 | 8 | 1 | 19 | 20 | 1 |
| North Carolina | 1 | 1 | 0 | 0 | 0 | 0 | 1 | 1 | 0 |
| North Dakota | 7 | 8 | 1 | 9 | 11 | 1 | 16 | 19 | 2 |
| Ohio | 3 | 4 | 0 | 3 | 4 | 0 | 6 | 8 | 0 |
| Oklahoma | 7 | 7 | 0 | 3 | 3 | 0 | 10 | 10 | 0 |
| Oregon | 6 | 7 | 1 | 9 | 14 | 0 | 15 | 20 | 1 |
| Pennsylvania | 3 | 3 | 0 | 4 | 5 | 0 | 7 | 8 | 0 |
| Rhode Island | 7 | 9 | 0 | 1 | 1 | 0 | 8 | 10 | 0 |
| South Carolina | 0 | 0 | 0 | 2 | 2 | 1 | 2 | 2 | 1 |
| South Dakota | 7 | 9 | 0 | 5 | 7 | 0 | 12 | 16 | 0 |
| Tennessee | 7 | 8 | 0 | 4 | 4 | 0 | 11 | 12 | 0 |
| Texas | 9 | 12 | 0 | 1 | 1 | 0 | 10 | 13 | 0 |
| Utah | 6 | 7 | 0 | 3 | 3 | 0 | 9 | 10 | 0 |
| Vermont | 11 | 11 | 0 | 4 | 4 | 3 | 15 | 15 | 3 |
| Virginia | 4 | 4 | 0 | 14 | 18 | 2 | 18 | 22 | 2 |
| Washington | 7 | 8 | 0 | 5 | 6 | 0 | 12 | 14 | 0 |
| West Virginia | 4 | 4 | 0 | 0 | 0 | 0 | 4 | 4 | 0 |
| Wisconsin | 18 | 21 | 3 | 12 | 15 | 2 | 30 | 36 | 5 |
| Wyoming | 2 | 2 | 0 | 1 | 1 | 0 | 3 | 3 | 0 |
| Total | 284 | 327 | 21 | 203 | 236 | 21 | 487 | 563 | 42 |

== See also ==
- List of third-party and independent United States governors
- List of United States major third party presidential tickets
- List of Libertarian Party politicians who have held office in the United States
- List of Green politicians who have held office in the United States
- List of Communist Party USA members who have held office in the United States
- List of Democratic Socialists of America public officeholders
