= List of third-party and independent performances in United States state legislative elections =

This is a list of notable performances of third party and independent candidates in elections to the state legislatures. It is rare for candidates, other than those of the six parties which have succeeded as major parties (Federalist Party, Democratic-Republican Party, National Republican Party, Democratic Party, Whig Party, Republican Party), to take large shares of the vote in elections.

Listed below are state legislature elections in which a third party or independent candidate won at least 5.0% of the vote. Winners are shown in bold and marked "elected" or "re-elected". Candidates who lost are included as well. To be included on this list the third party or independent party must be not running on the party line of one of the two major parties or any of their predecessors. Candidates are not included if they ran in a state with a non-partisan legislature at that time; the only state currently with a non-partisan legislature is Nebraska which has had that system since 1934.

== By state ==
- List of third-party and independent performances in Alaska state legislative elections
- List of third-party and independent performances in Arkansas state legislative elections
- List of third-party and independent performances in Colorado state legislative elections
- List of third-party and independent performances in Hawaii state legislative elections
- List of third-party and independent performances in Louisiana state legislative elections
- List of third-party and independent performances in Montana state legislative elections
- List of third-party and independent performances in Utah state legislative elections
- List of third-party and independent performances in West Virginia state legislative elections
- List of third-party and independent performances in Wyoming state legislative elections

== 1901–1920 ==
Notable third party state legislature performances (1901–1920)
Year	State	District	Party	Nominee	# Votes	% Votes	Place
1902	California	9th Assembly District	Socialist	Samuel J. Alderman	227	5.9 / 100	3rd of 3
1902	California	26th Assembly District	Independent	E. W. Weare	732	18.6 / 100	3rd of 3
1902	California	28th Assembly District	Union Labor Party	John M. Murphy	994	40.6 / 100	**Elected**
1902	California	34th Assembly District	Union Labor Party	John McKeon	834	29 / 100	2nd of 3
1902	California	37th Assembly District	Union Labor Party	J. W. Mayder	551	17.6 / 100	3rd of 3
1902	California	39th Assembly District	Union Labor Party	Harry A. Knox	1,034	44.7 / 100	2nd of 2 (Note: The only other candidate in the race was a Republican.)
1902	California	43rd Assembly District	Union Labor Party	John Millward	532	17.2 / 100	3rd of 3
1902	California	46th Assembly District	Union Labor Party	Thomas S. Manning	1,049	30.7 / 100	2nd of 2 (Note: The only other candidate in the race was a Republican.)
1902	California	47th Assembly District	Union Labor Party	Frank W. Halley	871	17.2 / 100	2nd of 3
1902	California	47th Assembly District	Socialist	G. W. Townsend	159	5.7 / 100	3rd of 3
1902	California	49th Assembly District	Socialist	O. S. Philbrook	1,299	42.6 / 100	2nd of 3
1902	California	68th Assembly District	Prohibition	Fletcher Pomeroy	175	8.2 / 100	3rd of 3
1902	California	69th Assembly District	Prohibition	M. G. McCaslin	211	6.5 / 100	3rd of 3
1902	California	14th Senate District	Socialist	S. Miller	562	14.4 / 100	2nd of 2 (Note: The only other candidate in the race was a Republican.)
1902	California	16th Senate District	Union Labor Party	Charles L. Pierce	2,831	39.9 / 100	2nd of 3
1902	California	20th Senate District	Union Labor Party	William J. Kenney	2,177	42 / 100	2nd of 3
1902	California	22nd Senate District	Union Labor Party	Patrick Hallinan	1,298	42 / 100	2nd of 3
1902	California	24th Senate District	Union Labor Party	E. J. Reynolds	1,186	19 / 100	2nd of 3
1902	California	28th Senate District	Independent	Charles M. Shortridge	2,557	44.6 / 100	**Elected**
1902	California	40th Senate District	Socialist	Harry M. McKee	653	10.7 / 100	3rd of 3
1902	Colorado	16th Senate District	Socialist	Charles P. McCary	872	18.56 / 100	3rd of 3
1904	California	30th Assembly District	Union Labor Party	Timothy Ryan	869	16.4 / 100	3rd of 5
1904	California	30th Assembly District	Socialist	Richard Corbett	351	9.8 / 100	4th of 5
1904	Florida	Manatee County	Socialist	Andrew Jackson Pettigrew	240	31.3 / 100	2nd
1906	California	9th Assembly District	Union Labor Party	John C. Williams	880	34.4 / 100	2nd of 2
1906	California	14th Senate District	Socialist	William H. Ross	548	14.5 / 100	2nd of 2 (Note: The only other candidate in the race was a Republican.)
1906	California	18th Senate District	Independence League	Henry Nixon Beatty	649	28 / 100	2nd of 4, Lost reelection as Independence League
1906	California	18th Senate District	Socialist	David Henderson	106	7.7 / 100	4th of 4
1906	Florida	Manatee County	Socialist	Andrew Jackson Pettigrew	395	52.1 / 100	**Elected**
1906	Minnesota	33rd Senate District	Prohibition	E.R. (Emerson R.) McKinney	1,877	39.31 / 100	2nd of 2 (Note: The only other candidate in the race was a Republican.)
1906	Minnesota	54th Senate District	Independent	Frank E. Minnette	1,792	46.83 / 100	2nd of 2 (Note: The only other candidate in the race was a Democrat.)
1906	New York	4th Senate District	Independence League	A. Stewart Walsh	6,458	22.09 / 100	3rd of 5
1908	New York	20th Senate District	Socialist	John J. Coyle	1,749	8.16 / 100	3rd of 5
1908	New York	20th Senate District	Independence League	Isidore P. Thomas	1,314	6.13 / 100	4th of 5
1910	California	17th Assembly District	Prohibition	Grove L. Johnson	509	15.5 / 100	2nd of 3
1910	California	17th Assembly District	Socialist	E. L. Macy	223	6.8 / 100	3rd of 3
1910	California	30th Assembly District	Socialist	Robert Larkins	120	10.5 / 100	3rd of 4
1910	Colorado	16th Senate District	Socialist	Robert S. Clark	990	9.41 / 100	3rd of 3
1910	New York	16th Senate District	Socialist	Ernest Ramm	2,173	10.18 / 100	3rd of 4
1912	California	61st Assembly District	Independent	Charles H. Randall	2,782	24.9 / 100	2nd of 5, lost reelection as independent
1912	California	61st Assembly District	Socialist	P. D. Noel	1,656	14.8 / 100	4th of 5
1912	California	61st Assembly District	Prohibition	Enoch A. Holtwick	696	6.2 / 100	5th of 5
1912	California	66th Assembly District	Socialist	William J. Coady	2,591	34.3 / 100	3rd of 3
1912	California	15th Senate District	Socialist	Harold French	3,805	16.2 / 100	3rd of 3
1912	California	33rd Senate District	Prohibition	Loring A. Pickering	2,727	15.2 / 100	3rd of 4
1912	California	33rd Senate District	Socialist	J. B. Rutherford	1,707	9.5 / 100	4th of 4
1912	Colorado	19th Senate District	Progressive (Bull Moose)	William G. White	1,244	26.27 / 100	2nd of 3
1912	Colorado	19th Senate District	Socialist	James A. Morris	514	10.85 / 100	3rd of 3
1914	New York	16th Senate District	Socialist	George I. Steinhardt	2,079	10.89 / 100	3rd of 4
1914	New York	20th Senate District	Socialist	Fred Gaa	1,924	12.26 / 100	3rd of 3
1914	New York	40th Senate District	Prohibition	N. Horace Gillette	1,310	15.5 / 100	3rd of 5
1916	Colorado	16th Senate District	Socialist	Robert B. Fyre	1,047	14.02 / 100	3rd of 3
1916	New York	20th Senate District	Socialist	Edward F. Cassidy	3,654	21.22 / 100	3rd of 4
1916	New York	36th Senate District	Progressive	Oswald P. Backus	1,937	26.27 / 100	3rd of 5
1918	Wisconsin	5th Senate District	Socialist	Rudolph Beyer	6,874	40.48 / 100	**Elected**
1918	Wisconsin	25th Senate District	Socialist	Christ Bloom	3,794	42.85 / 100	2nd
1920	California	33rd Senate District	Prohibition	Marie C. Brehm	13,060	37.56 / 100	2nd of 2 (Note: The only other candidate in the race was a Republican.)
1920	Illinois	6th House District	Socialist	Lewis W. Hardy	10,829	21.22 / 100	4th
1920	Illinois	15th House District	Socialist	John Joseph Jelinek	2,391	8.93 / 100	4th

== 1921–1940 ==
Notable third party state legislature performances (1921–1940)
Year	State	District	Party	Nominee	# Votes	% Votes	Place
1922	Colorado	12th Senate District	Farmer-Labor	A. C. Scott	2,338	16 / 100	3rd of 3
1922	New York	9th Senate District	Socialist	Samuel Block	5,406	8.11 / 100	3rd of 4
1922	New York	10th Senate District	Prohibition	James B. Davis	3,029	9.30 / 100	3rd of 4
1922	New York	18th Senate District	Socialist	Joseph D. Cannon	5,414	14.54 / 100	3rd of 4
1922	New York	21st Senate District	Prohibition	Andrew Loundsberry	5,598	11.90 / 100	3rd of 4
1924	California	14th Assembly District	Socialist	William R. Goforth	3,019	14.54 / 100	2nd of 2
1924	California	15th Assembly District	Independent	Raymond T. Coughlin	3,367	29.8 / 100	2nd of 3
1924	California	13th Senate District	Independent	Harry L. Davis	9,531	43.5 / 100	2nd of 2
1928	California	9th Assembly District	Independent	Jerrold L. Seawell	5,649	53.5 / 100	**Elected**
1930	New York	10th Senate District	Socialist	Sam L. Mailman	1,509	5.60 / 100	3rd of 3
1930	New York	21st Senate District	Socialist	Louis Hendin	8,496	17.69 / 100	2nd of 4
1932	New York	9th Senate District	Socialist	Samuel Block	5,406	8.11 / 100	3rd of 4
1932	New York	20th Senate District	Socialist	Max Delson	4,400	5.02 / 100	3rd of 4
1934	New York	8th Senate District	Socialist	Roger Cornell	10,002	8.71 / 100	3rd of 4
1936	California	22nd Assembly District	Communist	Archie Brown	2,548	9.3 / 100	2nd of 2
1936	California	21st Senate District	Socialist	Edward V. Peterson	4,123	12.04 / 100	2nd of 2 (Note: The only other candidate in the race was a Republican.)
1938	California	30th Senate District	Independent	Percy C. Church	2,930	5.39 / 100	3rd of 4
1938	California	36th Senate District	Communist	George C. Sandy	2,618	5.12 / 100	2nd of 2 (Note: The only other candidate in the race was a Republican.)
1938	California	40th Senate District	Communist	Bessie A. Keckler	6,523	7.06 / 100	2nd of 2 (Note: The only other candidate in the race was a Republican.)
1938	Colorado	18th Senate District	Independent	William Hartsook	1,675	18.06 / 100	3rd of 3
1940	Colorado	4th Senate District	Independent	Paul J. Cordova	1,197	9 / 100	3rd of 3

== 1941–1960 ==
Notable third party state legislature performances (1941–1960)
Year	State	District	Party	Nominee	# Votes	% Votes	Place
1942	California	15th Assembly District	Communist	Thomas R. Farrell	3,546	5.12 / 100	2nd of 2 (Note: The only other candidate in the race was a Republican.)
1942	California	47th Assembly District	Prohibition	Hawley N. Bidwell	2,065	7.7 / 100	3rd of 3
1942	California	64th Assembly District	Townsend	Herbert L. Sweet	1,656	8.3 / 100	3rd of 3
1942	Wisconsin	25th Senate District	Progressive (Wisconsin)	Clifford W. Krueger	6,512	30.22 / 100	2nd of 2
1942	Wisconsin	31st Senate District	Progressive (Wisconsin)	James Earl Leverich	6,835	50.48 / 100	**Elected**
1942	New York	4th Senate District	American Labor	Richard Mazza	56,388	26.01 / 100	3rd of 3
1942	New York	23rd Senate District	American Labor	Concetta E. Mingoia	47,873	22.92 / 100	3rd of
1944	Wisconsin	28th Senate District	Progressive (Wisconsin)	Fred T. Hansen	8,961	35.45 / 100	2nd of 2 (Note: The only other candidate in the race was a Republican.)
1944	Wisconsin	32nd Senate District	Progressive (Wisconsin)	Harry W. Schilling	10,995	35.37 / 100	2nd of 2 (Note: The only other candidate in the race was a Republican.)
1946	New York	15th Senate District	American Labor	Sylvia Schwartz	23,442	24.03 / 100	3rd of 3
1948	New York	1st Assembly District	American Labor	Hyman Joseph	6,113	12.35 / 100	3rd of 4
1948	New York	1st Assembly District	Liberal	George Tichenor	2,804	5.66 / 100	4th of 4
1948	New York	15th Senate District	American Labor	Helen Phillips	23,587	17.73 / 100	3rd of 3
1948	New York	20th Senate District	American Labor	Mary Van Kleeck	14,078	9.92 / 100	3rd of 3
1948	Wisconsin	7th Senate District	Progressive (Wisconsin)	Joseph Schmidt	5,277	19.46 / 100	3rd of 3
1948	Wisconsin	16th Senate District	Socialist	Paul A. Dahl	2,693	8.80 / 100	3rd of 3
1950	New York	27th Senate District	Liberal	Joseph Josephson	7,829	6.89 / 100	3rd of 4
1950	New York	27th Senate District	American Labor	Joseph Celli	6,388	5.63 / 100	4th of 4
1960	New York	27th Senate District	Liberal	Francisco Perez	11,929	13.39 / 100	3rd of 3

== 1961–1980 ==
Notable third party state legislature performances (1961–1980)
Year	State	District	Party	Nominee	# Votes	% Votes	Place
1962	Colorado	16th Senate District	Independent	Rena Mary Taylor	6,507	36.97 / 100	2nd of 2, Lost reelection as Independent
1966	Alabama	20th Senate District	Independent	Fletcher Jones	6,885	28.44 / 100	2nd of 3 (Note: Placed ahead of Republican)
1966	Alabama	24th Senate District, place 3	Alabama Conservative	Phil Holmes	6,317	10.07 / 100	3rd of 3
1966	Alabama	26th Senate District	Third Party for America	William Matthews	6,365	31.07 / 100	2nd of 3 (Note: Placed ahead of Republican)
1968	California	17th Assembly District	Peace and Freedom	Bobby Seale	550	9.51 / 100	3rd of 4
1968	California	37th Senate District	American Independent	Donna L. Demoret	15,878	9 / 100	2nd of 2
1970	California	36th Senate District	American Independent	Nial D. Meadows	28,353	17.66 / 100	2nd of 2 (Note: The only other candidate in the race was a Republican.)
1970	Colorado	2nd House District	La Raza Unida	Brian Sanchez	501	8.1 / 100	3rd of 3
1970	Colorado	6th House District	La Raza Unida	Eloy R. Espionza	7,538	9.2 / 100	3rd of 3
1970	Alabama	7th Senate District	NDPA	Lynn Ridgeway	415	6.32 / 100	2nd of 2
1970	Alabama	12th Senate District, place 1	NDPA	John Billingsley	25,917	20.55 / 100	2nd of 3
1970	Alabama	12th Senate District, place 1	Alabama Conservative	William Mori	6,380	5.06 / 100	3rd of 3
1970	Alabama	12th Senate District, place 2	NDPA	T. L. Crowell	24,001	18.93 / 100	2nd of 3
1970	Alabama	12th Senate District, place 2	Alabama Conservative	Lionel Ledbetter	11,104	8.76 / 100	3rd of 3
1970	Alabama	12th Senate District, place 3	NDPA	Herbert Johnson	22,448	18.19 / 100	2nd of 3
1970	Alabama	12th Senate District, place 4	NDPA	William. M. Pruitt	23,062	18.44 / 100	2nd of 3
1970	Alabama	12th Senate District, place 4	Alabama Conservative	William L. Gann	11,255	9.00 / 100	3rd of 3
1970	Alabama	12th Senate District, place 5	NDPA	Georgia Price	23,816	18.64 / 100	2nd of 4
1970	Alabama	12th Senate District, place 5	Alabama Independent	Don Watts	12,430	9.73 / 100	3rd of 4
1970	Alabama	12th Senate District, place 6	NDPA	Charles F. Williams	23,160	18.57 / 100	2nd of 3
1970	Alabama	12th Senate District, place 7	NDPA	Emory. L. Whittaker	24,424	19.55 / 100	2nd of 3
1970	Alabama	16th Senate District	Alabama Conservative	Bill Lacy	1,183	15.83 / 100	2nd of 2
1970	Alabama	18th Senate District	NDPA	O. B. Wilson	3,731	25.57 / 100	2nd of 3 (Note: Placed ahead of Republican)
1970	Alabama	19th Senate District	NDPA	Damon Kiel	1,239	17.41 / 100	2nd of 2
1970	Alabama	23rd Senate District	Alabama Independent	Zeke Calhoun	385	7.59 / 100	2nd of 2
1970	Alabama	24th Senate District, place 3	Alabama Conservative	W. C. Boykin	5,123	9.61 / 100	2nd of 2
1972	California	1st Senate District	Peace and Freedom	Toni Novak-Sutley	19,044	9.51 / 100	3rd of 3
1972	Colorado	9th House District	Independent	Robert "Bob"" Crider	1,804	21 / 100	2nd of 3
1972	Colorado	9th House District	La Raza Unida	Joe R. Gonzalez	1,586	18.5 / 100	3rd of 3
1972	Colorado	5th Senate District	Independent	F. Peter Wigginton	3,728	12.22 / 100	3rd of 3
1972	Massachusetts	6th Worcester District	Independent	Joseph A. Borski Jr	2,584	25.5 / 100	2nd of 4
1972	Massachusetts	6th Worcester District	Independent	Norma Cash Smith	1,061	10.5 / 100	4th of 4
1973	Virginia	30th House District	Independent	Norman Sisisky	4,987	59.7 / 100	**Elected**
1973	Virginia	34th House District	Independent	T. Dix Sutton	14,377	12.4 / 100	6th of 6
1974	Alabama	7th Senate District	NDPA	Ernestine Langford	1,182	7.41 / 100	2nd of 2
1974	Alabama	13th Senate District	Alabama Conservative	Herbert Stone	2,224	15.71 / 100	2nd of 2
1974	Alabama	23rd Senate District	NDPA	Robert Harris	2,097	11.05 / 100	3rd of 3
1974	Alabama	26th Senate District	Independent	William Hobbie	3,898	23.98 / 100	2nd of 4
1974	Alabama	26th Senate District	NDPA	Oscar Cook	1,945	11.97 / 100	3rd of 4
1974	Alabama	26th Senate District	Independent	J.D. Hogan	1,335	8.21 / 100	4th of 4
1974	Alabama	29th Senate District	NDPA	Amelia Boynton Robinson	6,483	30.07 / 100	2nd of 3
1974	Alabama	30th Senate District	NDPA	Martin Goodson	2,799	14.52 / 100	2nd of 2
1974	Alabama	35th Senate District	Alabama Conservative	Charles McDade	964	6.81 / 100	2nd of 2
1974	Delaware	36th House District	American Independent	Charles J. Rogers	476	14.27 / 100	2nd of 2
1974	Delaware	4th Senate District	American Independent	Erle V. Peterson	401	6.25 / 100	2nd of 2 (Note: The only other candidate in the race was a Republican.)
1974	Delaware	5th Senate District	American Independent	Robert G. LoPresti	339	7.23 / 100	2nd of 2 (Note: The only other candidate in the race was a Republican.)
1974	Wisconsin	67th Assembly District	American Independent	Cyril Rada	1,827	18.05 / 100	2nd of 2
1974	Wisconsin	68th Assembly District	American Independent	Joseph L. Larson	1,056	10 / 100	2nd of 2
1976	Wisconsin	61st Assembly District	American Independent	Gary Pederson	686	5.28 / 100	2nd of 2
1977	Massachusetts	31st Middlesex District	Independent	Mary S. Sweeney	1,570	30.6 / 100	2nd of 3 (Note: The only other candidate in the race was a Republican.)
1977	Massachusetts	31st Middlesex District	Independent	John Mc. J. Nulty	659	12.8 / 100	3rd of 3 (Note: The only other candidate in the race was a Republican.)
1977	Virginia	13th House District	Independent	Fred D. Smith Jr	13,775	18.9 / 100	4th of 6
1977	Alabama special	1st Senate District	Independent	Oscar Peden	6,009	52.4 / 100	**Elected**
1978	Alabama	5th Senate District	Independent	Bill Kitchens	1,183	6.96 / 100	2nd of 2
1978	California	33rd Assembly District	Independent	Grant W. Jensen	6,281	8.56 / 100	3rd of 3
1978	Colorado	8th House District	Independent	Pat Fuller	874	19.4 / 100	2nd of 2
1978	Colorado	46th House District	Libertarian	Neil Smith	1,925	15 / 100	2nd of 2 (Note: The only other candidate in the race was a Republican.)
1978	Massachusetts	4th Essex District	Independent	Thomas E. Sinkiewicz	4,230	25.5 / 100	3rd of 3
1978	Massachusetts	5th Worcester District	Independent	Ronald E. Allen	4,391	36.2 / 100	2nd of 3 (Note: The only other candidate in the race was a Republican.)
1978	Massachusetts	5th Worcester District	Independent	Robert A. Pentecost	1,675	13.8 / 100	3rd of 3 (Note: The only other candidate in the race was a Republican.)
1978	Wisconsin	50th Assembly District	Independent	David Woodbury	1,283	9 / 100	3rd of 3
1979	Virginia	45th House District	Independent	James W. Johnson	4,865	36.6 / 100	2nd of 2
1980	California	1st Senate District	Libertarian	Steve Sparling	16,259	5.84 / 100	3rd of 4
1980	California	11th Senate District	Libertarian	John R. Redding	13,393	6.10 / 100	3rd of 3

== 1981–2000 ==
Notable third party state legislature performances (1981–2000)
Year	State	District	Party	Nominee	# Votes	% Votes	Place
1982	Delaware	19th Senate District	American Independent	Donald L. Donovan	258	5.03 / 100	2nd
1982	Massachusetts	1st Worcester District	Independent	C. Paul Bush	1,613	10.5 / 100	3rd of 3
1982	New York	96th Assembly District	Conservative (NY)	Patricia DeFreest	2,035	6.74 / 100	3rd
1983	Alabama	38th House District	Independent	Bill Fuller	3,010	47.37 / 100	**Elected**
1983	Alabama	38th House District	Independent	Dorothy W. Morris	1,391	21.89 / 100	3rd
1984	California	12th Assembly District	Libertarian	Fred E. Foldvary	10,983	12.5 / 100	2nd of 3
1984	California	23rd Assembly District	Libertarian	Dante De Amicis	10,726	12.2 / 100	2nd of 2
1984	California	25th Assembly District	Libertarian	Mark Hinkle	7,431	8.3 / 100	2nd of 2
1986	California	55th Assembly District	Peace and Freedom	Michael Zinzun	2,723	7.3 / 100	3rd of 4
1986	California	74th Assembly District	Libertarian	Don Ellis	12,041	12.5 / 100	2nd of 2
1986	California	8th Senate District	Independent	Quentin L. Kopp	81,501	46.9 / 100	**Elected**
1986	California	38th Senate District	Libertarian	Betsy A. Mill	31,826	14.9 / 100	2nd of 2
1986	Delaware	23rd House District	American Independent	Nancy S. Kelsch	184	6.56 / 100	2nd
1986	New York	14th Assembly District	Right to Life	Jean Ryan	1,926	5.64 / 100	3rd
1986	Vermont	Lamoille 3	Independent	H. Bruce Burnor	371	33.2 / 100	2nd of 3
1986	Vermont	Lamoille 3	Independent	Dennis Albanese	191	17.1 / 100	3rd of 3
1986	Vermont	Orleans 1	Independent	Bernard Peters	199	16.2 / 100	2nd of 2
1987	Massachusetts	1st Hampden District	Independent	Joseph S. Knapp	1,232	16.6 / 100	3rd of 3
1988	California	17th Senate District	Peace and Freedom	Shoshana Towers	5,826	5.15 / 100	3rd
1988	Vermont	Windham 2-2 District	Liberty Union	Richard E. Ellison	202	15 / 100	2nd of 2
1990	New York	35th Assembly District	Conservative (NY)	Nicholas Narducci	551	7.29 / 100	2nd
1990	New York	34th Senate District	Right to Life	Thomas Byrne	2,522	8.70 / 100	2nd
1990	Vermont	Chittenden 7-1	Independent	Lanny Watts	1,011	19.2 / 100	3rd of 4
1990	Vermont	Chittenden 7-3	Independent	Dean Corren	924	27.4 / 100	3rd of 4
1990	Vermont	Chittenden 7-7	Progressive	Tom O. Smith	1,159	29.9 / 100	**Elected**
1990	Vermont	Chittenden 7-7	Independent	Ron Latour Sr	200	5.2 / 100	5th of 5
1990	Vermont	Essex 1	Independent	Malcolm Downing	478	40.6 / 100	2nd of 2
1990	Vermont	Franklin 3	Independent	Mike Moran	515	29.0 / 100	2nd of 3
1990	Vermont	Windham 2-2	Independent	Shoshana Rihn	459	43.0 / 100	2nd of 2
1992	California	14th Assembly District	Peace and Freedom	Marsha Feinland	27,468	17.86 / 100	2nd
1992	California	1st Senate District	Green	Kent Smith	32,717	9.47 / 100	3rd
1992	California	13th Senate District	Libertarian	John H. Webster	19,258	8.31 / 100	3rd
1992	Vermont	Addison-Rutland 2 District	Independent	Colleen E. Bertrand	306	14.8 / 100	3rd of 3
1992	Vermont	Chittenden 7-3 District	Independent	Dean Corren	2,288	34.7 / 100	**Elected**
1992	Vermont	Chittenden 7-3 District	Independent	Jim Court	1,420	21.5 / 100	3rd of 3
1992	Vermont	Chittenden 7-4 District	Progressive	Terry Bouricius	1,097	100 / 100	**Elected (unopposed)**
1994	Georgia	3rd House District	Independent	Charles C. Proctor Sr.	3,626	41.90 / 100	2nd
1994	Kansas	46th House District	Libertarian	Ena J. Wheeler	609	9.79 / 100	3rd
1996	California	14th Assembly District	Green	Hank Chapot	12,851	9.41 / 100	3rd
1996	Delaware	1st House District	Libertarian	J. Burke Morrison	522	9.67 / 100	2nd
1996	Delaware	4th House District	Natural Law	Jacqueline Kossoff	282	8.61 / 100	2nd
1998	Kansas	30th House District	Libertarian	Michael Kerner	808	15.16 / 100	2nd
2000	Florida	13th House District	Independent	Susan Eldridge	8,420	20.87 / 100	2nd
2000	Vermont	Chittenden-7-4 district	Progressive	Carina Driscoll	863	76.30 / 100	**Elected**

== 2001–2020 ==
Notable third party state legislature performances (2001–2020)
Year	State	District	Party	Nominee	# Votes	% Votes	Place
2002	California	1st Assembly District	Green	Doug Thron	15,315	11.6 / 100	3rd of 3
2002	California	7th Assembly District	Libertarian	David Kozlowski	24,386	14.58 / 100	2nd of 2
2002	California	12th Assembly District	Libertarian	Michael F. Denny	5,985	6.4 / 100	3rd of 3
2002	California	36th Senate District	Libertarian	Michael S. Metti	13,258	14.58 / 100	3rd of 3
2002	Florida	5th House District	Libertarian	Ricardo Meijas	5,988	14.58 / 100	2nd of 2 (Note: The only other candidate in the race was a Republican.)
2002	Florida	17th House District	Libertarian	Ty Price	8,573	20.92 / 100	2nd of 2 (Note: The only other candidate in the race was a Republican.)
2002	Florida	64th House District	Libertarian	Michael Krech	8,878	25.10 / 100	2nd of 2 (Note: The only other candidate in the race was a Republican.)
2002	Florida	77th House District	Libertarian	Scott Hudmon	6,644	19.57 / 100	2nd of 2 (Note: The only other candidate in the race was a Republican.)
2002	Florida	81st House District	Libertarian	John Roszman	12,306	24.35 / 100	2nd of 2 (Note: The only other candidate in the race was a Republican.)
2002	Florida	119th House District	Libertarian	Mark Eckert	7,190	27.77 / 100	2nd of 2 (Note: The only other candidate in the race was a Republican.)
2002	Illinois	8th House District	Green	Julie Samuels	3,355	9.66 / 100	3rd
2002	Maine	118th Senate District	Green	John Eder	1,796	67.1 / 100	**Elected**
2002	Minnesota	60th Senate District	Green	Nick Granath	6,776	19.77 / 100	2nd of 2
2002	New York	95th Assembly District	Green	Ellen C. Jaffee	1,956	6 / 100	3rd of 4
2004	California	10th Assembly District	Libertarian	Cullene Lang	39,016	24.4 / 100	2nd of 2 (Note: The only other candidate in the race was a Republican.)
2004	California	24th Assembly District	Libertarian	Zander Y. Collier III	8,337	5.3 / 100	3rd of 3
2004	Georgia	76th House District	Libertarian	Ken Parmalee	1,487	9.48 / 100	2nd
2004	Maine	118th Senate District	Green	John Eder	2,417	50.9 / 100	**Reelected**
2006	California	30th Senate District	Libertarian	Karl N. Dickey	15,683	12.21 / 100	2nd
2006	Florida	81st House District	Green	Kristina Wright	4,699	5.17 / 100	3rd
2006	Florida	1st Senate District	Constitution	Louis Jack Tart	30,207	18.79 / 100	2nd
2006	Florida	12th Senate District	Constitution	C. Bert Linthicum	34,895	28.90 / 100	2nd
2006	Kansas	46th House District	Libertarian	Marcus Kirby	876	13.71 / 100	2nd
2006	Kentucky	2nd Senate District	Independent	Bob Leeper	15,497	41.08 / 100	**Reelected as Independent**
2008	Florida	81st House District	Green	Kristina Wright	4,699	5.17 / 100	3rd
2008	Florida	1st Senate District	Constitution	Louis Jack Tart	30,207	18.79 / 100	2nd
2008	Illinois	12th House District	Green	Tim Quirk	7,100	15.57 / 100	2nd
2008	Illinois	21st House District	Green	Rita Maniotis	3,464	8.73 / 100	3rd
2008	Maine	118th Senate District	Green	John Eder	1,534	48.4 / 100	2nd
2010	Alabama	29th House District	Independent	Harri Anne Smith	23,800	55.21 / 100	**Reelected as Independent.**
2010	California	22nd Assembly District	Libertarian	T.J. Campbell	6,478	5.83 / 100	3rd
2010	California	36th Assembly District	Libertarian	Herbert G. Peters	10,840	5.65 / 100	3rd
2010	California	10th Senate District	American Independent	Ivan Chou	11,871	5.66 / 100	3rd
2011	Mississippi	13th Senate District	Independent	Clayton Barksdale	2,358	21.20 / 100	2nd
2012	Delaware	14th House District	Libertarian	Margaret V. Melson	925	10.08 / 100	2nd
2012	Illinois	52nd House District	Independent	Dee Beaubien	18,392	40.7 / 100	2nd
2012	Nevada	1st Senate District	Constitution	Gregory Hughes	13,221	31.3 / 100	2nd
2012	New Mexico	10th Senate District	Independent	Joseph Carraro	8,474	45.7 / 100	2nd
2012	Texas	26th House District	Green	Chris Christal	10,588	6.0 / 100	3rd
2012	Texas	26th House District	Libertarian	N. Ruben Flores Perez	22,989	5.3 / 100	2ns
2012	Texas	48th House District	Libertarian	Joe Edgar	4,134	5.3 / 100	3rd
2012	Texas	51st House District	Libertarian	Arthur DiBianca	4,411	11.8 / 100	2nd
2012	Vermont	Chittenden 6-4	Progressive	Christopher A. Pearson	863	39.7 / 100	2nd of 2
2014	Alabama	29th House District	Independent	Harri Anne Smith	17,830	52.38 / 100	**Reelected**
2014	Florida	5th House District	Libertarian	Karen Schoen	11,813	23.6 / 100	2nd
2014	Florida	12th House District	Green	Karen Lea Morian	20,496	31.7 / 100	2nd
2014	Texas	4th House District	Libertarian	Rick Stralow	3,253	10.9 / 100	2nd
2014	Texas	8th House District	Libertarian	John Wilford	3,581	12.1 / 100	2nd
2014	Texas	48th House District	Libertarian	Ben Easton	11,126	21.9 / 100	2nd
2014	Texas	51st House District	Libertarian	Arthur DiBianca	3,105	12.6 / 100	2nd
2014	Minnesota	65A House District	Green	Lena Buggs	1,308	14.06 / 100	3rd of 3
2014	Wisconsin	5th Senate District	Libertarian	Wendy Friedrich	19,997	26.38 / 100	2nd of 2
2015	Mississippi	51st Senate District	Libertarian	Boyd T. Kendall	1,746	16.95 / 100	2nd
2016	Alaska	District F	Independent	Tim Hale	4,750	27.89 / 100	2nd
2016	Alaska	District L	Independent	Tom Johnson	1,088	7.40 / 100	3rd
2016	California	1st Assembly District	Libertarian	Donn Coenen	52,871	26.24 / 100	2nd
2016	California	2nd Assembly District	Libertarian	Ken Anton	51,245	27.08 / 100	2nd
2016	California	37th Assembly District	Independent	Edward Fuller	71,944	35.92 / 100	2nd
2016	California	51st Assembly District	Libertarian	Mike Everling	17,724	13.87 / 100	2nd
2016	California	62nd Assembly District	Libertarian	Baron Bruno	8,958	5.59 / 100	3rd
2016	Connecticut	39th House District	Green	Ronna Stuller	440	8.23 / 100	2nd
2016	Connecticut	71st House District	Independent	Danielle Albert	1,588	20.13 / 100	2nd
2016	Connecticut	84th House District	Green	Matt Went	678	14.09 / 100	2nd
2016	Connecticut	122nd House District	Green	Angela Capinera	1,440	13.80 / 100	2nd
2016	Connecticut	125th House District	Green	Hector Lopez	1,288	12.21 / 100	2nd
2016	Connecticut	15th Senate District	Independent	James K. Russell	4,407	17.83 / 100	2nd
2016	Florida	1st House District	Independent	Bill Fetke	17,192	23.56 / 100	2nd
2016	Florida	5th House District	Independent	Jamey Westbrook	24,443	32.05 / 100	2nd
2016	Florida	31st House District	Independent	Robert Rightmyer	20,380	26.79 / 100	2nd
2016	Florida	90th House District	Libertarian	Artie Lurie	13,088	20.46 / 100	2nd
2016	Hawaii	13th House District	Green	Nick Nikhilananda	2,773	12.21 / 100	2nd
2016	Kansas	19th House District	Libertarian	John Taube	806	5.85 / 100	3rd
2016	Minnesota	33rd Senate District	Libertarian	Jay Nygard	3,080	6.08 / 100	3rd of 3
2016	Nevada	36th Assembly District	Libertarian	Dennis Hof	10,675	39.24 / 100	2nd
2016	Nevada	40th Assembly District	Constitution	John Wagner	2,173	7.24 / 100	3rd
2016	Nevada	3rd Senate District	Libertarian	Jonathan Friedrich	2,889	8.22 / 100	3rd
2016	Nevada	7th Senate District	Libertarian	Kimberly Schjang	12,454	30.46 / 100	2nd
2016	New York	45th Assembly District	Conservative (NY)	Boris Gintchanski	4,692	20.77 / 100	2nd
2016	New York	47th Assembly District	Conservative (NY)	Malka Shahar	2,416	11.35 / 100	2nd
2016	New York	81st Assembly District	Conservative (NY)	Alah H. Reed	3,010	8.26 / 100	2nd
2016	New York	88th Assembly District	Conservative (NY)	Anthony Decintio Jr.	7,643	15.23 / 100	2nd
2016	New York	101st Assembly District	Conservative (NY)	Maria E. Kelso	5,322	10.56 / 100	3rd
2016	New York	103rd Assembly District	Conservative (NY)	Jack Hayes	12,105	22.37 / 100	2nd
2016	New York	114th Assembly District	Green	Robin M. Barkenhagen	7,562	15.02 / 100	2nd
2016	New York	127th Assembly District	Conservative (NY)	Michael J. Becallo	4,064	6.23 / 100	3rd
2016	New York	45th Senate District	Green	Stephen Matthew Ruzbacki	12,553	11.92 / 100	2nd
2016	South Dakota	5th House District	Independent	Chuck Haan	1,882	11.65 / 100	4th
2016	South Dakota	15th House District	Independent	Mike Myers	1,784	20.89 / 100	3rd
2016	South Dakota	15th House District	Independent	Eric Leggett	1,719	20.13 / 100	4th
2016	Texas	51st House District	Green	Kat Gruene	6,162	5.77 / 100	2nd
2016	Texas	127th House District	Libertarian	Scott Ford	7,486	12.33 / 100	2nd
2016	Texas	127th House District	Green	Joseph McElligott	3,501	5.77 / 100	3rd
2016	Utah	16th House District	Libertarian	Brent Zimmerman	1,214	8.45 / 100	3rd
2016	Utah	46th House District	Libertarian	Lee Anne Walker	3,932	23.86 / 100	2nd
2016	Utah	68th House District	Constitution	Kirk Pearson	1,597	10.56 / 100	3rd
2016	Wisconsin	41st Assembly District	Independent	Bradley Pearson	7,382	29.42 / 100	2nd of 2
2016	Wisconsin	78th Assembly District	Independent	Chris Fisher	6,661	20.80 / 100	2nd of 2
2018	Alabama	1st House District	Independent	Bobby James Dolan III	4,336	30.45 / 100	2nd
2018	California	4th Assembly District	Libertarian	Brandon Z. Nelson	40,398	24.78 / 100	2nd
2018	California	6th Senate District	Independent	Eric Frame	93,217	30.45 / 100	2nd
2018	Delaware	15th House District	Libertarian	Amy Merlino	1,011	12.12 / 100	2nd
2018	Florida	87th House District	Green	Samson LeBeau Kpadenou	4,622	15.41 / 100	2nd
2018	Georgia	29th House District	Independent	Nancy Stead	4,595	32.08 / 100	2nd
2018	Nevada	13th Assembly District	Constitution	Leonard Foster	9,228	35.2 / 100	2nd
2018	New York	61st Assembly District	Working Families	Patricia Kane	2,956	9.9 / 100	2nd
2018	New York	61st Assembly District	Green	Daniel Falcone	1,672	5.6 / 100	3rd
2018	New York	66th Assembly District	Working Families	Cynthia Nixon	8,013	17.5 / 100	2nd
2018	New York	84th Assembly District	Working Families	Amanda Septimo	1,209	6 / 100	3rd of 4
2018	New York	62nd Senate District	Green	Peter Diachun	10,539	15.41 / 100	2nd
2018	Ohio	14th House District	Libertarian	Ryan McClain	9,143	28.03 / 100	2nd
2018	Texas	127th House District	Libertarian	Ryan Woods	10,981	19.8 / 100	2nd
2018	Wyoming	55th House district	Libertarian	Bethany Baldes	1,592	49.01 / 100	2nd of 2
2020	Arkansas	14th House District	Independent	Christia Jones	954	8.0 / 100	3rd
2020	Arkansas	50th House District	Libertarian	Stephen Edwards	3,469	32.5 / 100	2nd
2020	California	7th Assembly District	Libertarian	James O. Just	52,543	26.06 / 100	2nd
2020	California	58th Assembly District	Green	Margaret Villa	41,100	9.09 / 100	2nd
2020	Illinois	18th House District	Independent	Sean Matlis	16,699	27.7 / 100	2nd
2020	Illinois	55th House District	Libertarian	Glenn Olofson	12,000	27.4 / 100	2nd
2020	Illinois	87th House District	Green	Angel Sides	7,666	15.5 / 100	2nd
2020	Illinois	92nd House District	Libertarian	Chad Grimm	9,890	25.5 / 100	2nd
2020	Maine	22nd House District	Green	Michael Barden III	937	16.6 / 100	3rd
2020	Maine	42nd House District	Green	Carolyn Silvius	567	11 / 100	3rd
2020	Maine	62nd House District	Independent	John Michael	1,519	48.6 / 100	2nd
2020	Maine	68th House District	Independent	Patrick Scully	2,726	47.1 / 100	2nd
2020	Texas	4th House District	Libertarian	K. Nicole Sprabary	17,437	20.9 / 100	2nd
2020	Texas	8th House District	Libertarian	R. Edwin Adams	8,271	14.1 / 100	2nd
2020	Texas	127th House District	Libertarian	Neko Antoniou	25,653	29.7 / 100	2nd
2020	Wyoming	38th House district	Libertarian	Shawn Johnson	1,068	24.47 / 100	2nd
2020	Wyoming	**39th House district**	Libertarian	**Marshall Burt**	**1,696**	53.60 / 100	**Elected**
2020	Wyoming	47th House district	Libertarian	Lela Konecny	886	21.10 / 100	2nd
2020	Wyoming	55th House district	Libertarian	Bethany Baldes	2,026	49.44 / 100	2nd
2020	Wyoming	58th House district	Libertarian	Joseph Porambo	646	19.04 / 100	2nd
2020	Wyoming	30th Senate district	Libertarian	Wendy Degroot	1,762	22.43 / 100	2nd

== 2021–present ==
Notable third party state legislature performances (2021–present)
Year	State	District	Party	Nominee	# Votes	% Votes	Place
2021	Pennsylvania	22nd Senate district	Green	Marlene Sebastianelli	5,373	9.09 / 100	3rd of 4
2021	Virginia	70th House District	Independent	David Vaught	8,435	38.9 / 100	2nd of 2 (Note: The only other candidate in the race was a Democrat.)
2022	Alabama	6th House District	Libertarian	Greg Turner	2,597	18.8 / 100	2nd of 2 (Note: The only other candidate in the race was a Republican.)
2022	Alabama	8th House District	Libertarian	Angela Walser	1,255	14.7 / 100	2nd of 2 (Note: The only other candidate in the race was a Republican.)
2022	Alabama	9th House District	Libertarian	Gregory Bodine	953	14.7 / 100	2nd of 2 (Note: The only other candidate in the race was a Republican.)
2022	Alabama	13th House District	Libertarian	Mark Davenport	663	5.5 / 100	2nd of 2 (Note: The only other candidate in the race was a Republican.)
2022	Alabama	18th House District	Libertarian	Talia Shrimp	571	5 / 100	2nd of 2 (Note: The only other candidate in the race was a Republican.)
2022	Alabama	29th House District	Libertarian	Clifford Valentin	779	5.8 / 100	2nd of 2 (Note: The only other candidate in the race was a Republican.)
2022	Alabama	38th House District	Libertarian	Charles Temm Jr.	1,161	11.2 / 100	2nd of 2 (Note: The only other candidate in the race was a Republican.)
2022	Arizona	10th Senate District	Independent	Nick Fierro	34,382	38.9 / 100	2nd of 2 (Note: The only other candidate in the race was a Republican.)
2022	California	8th Assembly District	Libertarian	Thomas Nichols	28,013	25.7 / 100	2nd of 2 (Note: The only other candidate in the race was a Republican.)
2022	California	11th Assembly District	Independent	Jenny Callison	48,620	40.5 / 100	2nd of 2 (Note: The only other candidate in the race was a Republican.)
2022	California	59th Assembly District	Independent	Leon Sit	27,302	28.0 / 100	2nd of 2 (Note: The only other candidate in the race was a Republican.)
2022	Florida	55th House District	Constitution	Charles Hacker Jr.	16,708	22.4 / 100	2nd of 2 (Note: The only other candidate in the race was a Republican.)
2022	Florida	11th Senate District	Green	Brian Moore	64,119	25 / 100	2nd of 2 (Note: The only other candidate in the race was a Republican.)
2022	Connecticut	127th House District	Working Families Party	John Hennessy	312	8.5 / 100	3rd of 3, lost reelection as Working Families Party
2022	Delaware	30th House District	Libertarian	Justin Brant	655	9.8 / 100	2nd of 2 (Note: The only other candidate in the race was a Republican.)
2022	Idaho	8A House District	Constitution	Steven Feil	3,088	20.3 / 100	2nd of 2
2022	Idaho	8B House District	Constitution	Tony Ullrich	2,482	16.5 / 100	2nd of 2
2022	Idaho	16A House District	Independent	Wayne Richey	1,039	5.9 / 100	3rd of 3
2022	Idaho	21A House District	Constitution	Daniel S. Weston	881	5.1 / 100	3rd of 4
2022	Idaho	25B House District	Independent	Liyah Babayan	3,155	27.6 / 100	2nd of 2
2022	Indiana	45th House District	Independent	Cody Alsman	5,805	30.2 / 100	2nd of 2
2022	Indiana	52nd House District	Libertarian	Morgan Rigg	3,000	18.3 / 100	2nd of 2
2022	Indiana	76th House District	Independent	Cheryl Batteiger-Smith	1,860	8.9 / 100	3rd of 3
2022	Indiana	77th House District	Libertarian	Jada Burton	2,508	23.3 / 100	2nd of 2
2022	Indiana	93rd House District	Independent	Karl Knable	875	6.3 / 100	3rd of 3
2022	Iowa	25th Senate District	Libertarian	Jordan Taylor	4,451	23.6 / 100	2nd of 2
2022	Kansas	74th House District	Libertarian	Henry Hein	1,938	23.2 / 100	2nd of 2
2022	Massachusetts	14th Norfolk District	Green-Rainbow	David Rolde	1,167	7.6 / 100	2nd of 2 (Note: The only other candidate in the race was a Democrat.)
2022	Minnesota	65A House District	Legal Marijuana Now	Miki Frost	1,302	13.21 / 100	3rd of 3
2022	Nevada	4th Assembly District	Libertarian	Darby Burns	9,452	39.4 / 100	2nd of 2
2022	Nevada	26th Assembly District	Libertarian	Reed Mitchell	9,455	28.3 / 100	2nd of 2
2022	New York	81st Assembly District	Working Families	Jessica Altagracia Woolford	3,518	14.2 / 100	2nd of 2
2022	New York	81st Assembly District	Conservative (NY)	Kevin Pazmino	2,516	10.1 / 100	3rd of 3
2022	New York	21st Senate District	Working Families	David Alexis	11,581	20 / 100	2nd of 2
2022	New York	48th Senate District	Conservative (NY)	Justin M. Coretti	7,217	7 / 100	3rd of 3
2022	North Dakota	6th Senate District	Independent	Robert Tolar	1,533	17.2 / 100	2nd of 2
2022	North Dakota	39th Senate District	Independent	Thea Lee	1,844	29.3 / 100	2nd of 2
2022	Tennessee	6th House District	Independent	Joel Goodman	4,283	23.5 / 100	2nd of 2
2022	Tennessee	27th House District	Independent	Michael Potter	6,380	29.3 / 100	2nd of 2
2022	Texas	5th Senate District	Libertarian	Tommy Estes	76,317	31.29 / 100	2nd of 2
2022	Texas	14th Senate District	Libertarian	Steven Haskett	57,305	17.8 / 100	2nd of 2
2022	Texas	22nd Senate District	Libertarian	Jeremy Schroppel	66,204	25.7 / 100	2nd of 2
2022	Utah	9th House District	Libertarian	Jacob Johnson	723	7.3 / 100	3rd of 3
2022	Utah	15th House District	United Utah	Ammon Gruwell	3,147	22.3 / 100	2nd of 2
2022	Utah	20th House District	Libertarian	Daniel Cottam	764	5.7 / 100	3rd of 3
2022	Utah	30th House District	United Utah	Evan Rodgers	638	6.2 / 100	3rd of 3
2022	Vermont	Chittenden 19 district	Libertarian	Spencer Sherman	628	11.6 / 100	3rd of 3
2022	Vermont	Lamoille 1 district	Independent	Jed Lipsky	1,386	39.79 / 100	**Elected**
2022	West Virginia	12th Senate District	Libertarian	Austin Lynch	8,529	31.31 / 100	2nd of 2
2022	West Virginia	House of Delegates, 91st District	ACT	S. Marshall Wilson	1,666	39.79 / 100	2nd of 2
2024	Arkansas	8th House District	Libertarian	Michael Kalagias	3,398	23.7 / 100	2nd of 2
2024	Arkansas	61st House District	Libertarian	Garrett Sheeks	2,196	22.2 / 100	2nd of 2
2024	Florida	2nd House District	Independent	Kim Kline	6,515	7.0 / 100	3rd of 3
2024	Florida	105th House District	Libertarian	Joshua Hlavka	12,501	20.2 / 100	2nd of 2
2024	Hawaii	12th House District	Green	Rita Ryan	649	6.9 / 100	3rd of 3
2024	Hawaii	48th House District	Green	Asheemo Daily	1,537	16.6 / 100	2nd of 2
2024	Massachusetts	17th House District	Pirate	Joseph Onoroski	2,663	22.2 / 100	2nd of 2
2024	Minnesota	21A House District	Independence-Alliance	Creedence Petroff	3,517	15.8 / 100	2nd of 2
2024	Minnesota	44B House District	Libertarian	Trenton (T.J.) Hawthorne	1,298	5.91 / 100	3rd of 3
2024	Minnesota	61A House District	Green	Toya López	3,284	15.11 / 100	2nd of 2
2024	New York	52nd Assembly District	Conservative (NY)	Brett Wynkoop	3,517	5.47 / 100	2nd of 2
2024	New York	16th Senate District	Conservative (NY)	Juan M. Pagan	11,679	15.65 / 100	2nd of 2
2024	New York	36th Senate District	Conservative (NY)	Irene Estrada	6,751	7.11 / 100	2nd of 2
2024	Oregon	14th Senate District	Libertarian	Katy Brumbelow	10,149	14.4 / 100	2nd of 2 (Note: The only other candidate in the race was a Democrat.)
2024	Rhode Island	69th House District	Independent	Sergei Sharenko	2,065	36.2 / 100	2nd of 2
2024	South Carolina	7th House District	Libertarian	Hunter Savirino	1,368	9.05 / 100	2nd of 2 (Note: The only other candidate in the race was a Republican.)
2024	Vermont	Chittenden 17 District	Progressive	Missa Aloisi	935	37.4 / 100	2nd of 2 (Note: The only other candidate in the race was a Democrat.)
2024	Vermont	Windham 3 District	Independent	Casey K. Cota	2,004	25.9 / 100	3rd of 4
2025	Oklahoma	8th Senate District	Independent	Steve Sanford	436	8.71 / 100	3rd of 3

== See also ==
- List of third-party performances in United States House elections
