= List of third-party and independent United States governors =

This is a list of third party and independent United States governors. It includes governors who have not been members of the Democratic, Republican, Whig, National Republican, Democratic-Republican, or Federalist parties.

Since its founding, the United States has been a two-party system, and it is rare for independents or members of third parties to be elected to high offices such as the governorship. However, it has happened on several occasions, which are documented below. The most recent-serving independent governor is Bill Walker of Alaska, who served 2014–2018. The most recent member of a third party (not an independent) elected to a governorship is Jesse Ventura, a member of the Independence Party of Minnesota who was elected Governor of Minnesota in 1998.

While there have been few third parties that have gained traction at the national level, several states have been three-party systems at one point or another. These include Minnesota with the Farmer–Labor Party from 1918–1944, North Dakota with the Nonpartisan League from 1915–1956, Wisconsin with the Progressive Party from 1934–1946, Nevada with the Silver Party from 1892–1911, Virginia with the Readjuster Party from 1877–1895, and South Carolina with the Nullifier Party from 1828–1839.

Not included are governors who were elected before the state's ratification of the United States Constitution or governors of U.S. territories prior to their admission to the Union. Also not included are military or appointed governors of former Confederate states after the American Civil War.

== Pre-Reconstruction (1787–1865) ==
State	Portrait	Governor	Party	Start of term	End of term	Notes
Massachusetts		John Hancock	Independent	May 30, 1787	October 8, 1793	Massachusetts ratified the U.S. Constitution on February 6, 1788, died in office
Georgia		George Handley	Independent	January 26, 1788	January 7, 1789	
Pennsylvania		Thomas Mifflin	Independent	November 5, 1788	December 17, 1799	Titled "President" 1788–90
Virginia		Beverley Randolph	Independent	December 1, 1788	December 1, 1791	
Delaware		Jehu Davis	Independent	March 29, 1789	June 2, 1789	Titled "President"
Rhode Island		Arthur Fenner	Country	May 5, 1790	October 15, 1805	Rhode Island ratified the U.S. Constitution on May 29, 1790, died in office
Massachusetts		Samuel Adams	Independent	October 8, 1793	June 2, 1797	Acting Governor from 1793–94
Rhode Island		Henry Smith	Country	October 15, 1805	May 7, 1806	
Rhode Island		Isaac Wilbour	Country	May 7, 1806	May 6, 1807	Acting governor
Vermont		Thomas Chittenden	Independent	March 4, 1791	August 25, 1797	Governor of the Vermont Republic 1778–89; 90–91, died in office
Maryland		George Plater	Independent	November 14, 1791	February 10, 1792	Died in office
Massachusetts		Moses Gill	Independent	June 7, 1799	May 20, 1800	Acting Governor, died in office
Virginia		Hardin Burnley	Independent	December 7, 1799	December 11, 1799	Acting governor
Virginia		John Pendleton Jr.	Independent	December 11, 1799	December 19, 1799	Acting governor
Connecticut		Oliver Wolcott Jr.	Toleration	May 8, 1817	May 2, 1827	
Illinois		Shadrach Bond	Independent	October 6, 1818	December 5, 1822	
Illinois		Edward Coles	Independent	December 5, 1822	December 6, 1826	
North Carolina		Hutchins Gordon Burton	Independent	December 7, 1824	December 8, 1827	
Indiana		James B. Ray	Independent	February 12, 1825	December 7, 1831	
South Carolina		Stephen Decatur Miller	Nullifier	December 10, 1828	December 9, 1830	
South Carolina		James Hamilton Jr.	Nullifier	December 9, 1830	December 10, 1832	
Vermont		William A. Palmer	Anti-Masonic	October 18, 1831	November 2, 1835	
South Carolina		Robert Y. Hayne	Nullifier	December 10, 1832	December 9, 1834	
Pennsylvania		Joseph Ritner	Anti-Masonic	December 15, 1835	January 15, 1839	
Rhode Island		Samuel Ward King	Rhode Island Party	May 2, 1839	May 2, 1843	Governorship disputed 1842–43, see Dorr Rebellion
Rhode Island		Thomas Wilson Dorr	Dorr Rebellion	May 1, 1842	January 23, 1843	Extralegal governor, disputed with Samuel Ward King, see Dorr Rebellion
Rhode Island		James Fenner	Law and Order	May 2, 1843	May 6, 1845	
Alabama		Joshua L. Martin	Independent	December 10, 1845	December 16, 1847	
Rhode Island		Byron Diman	Law and Order	May 6, 1846	May 4, 1847	
Georgia		Howell Cobb	Constitutional Union	November 5, 1851	November 9, 1853	
Mississippi		Henry S. Foote	Union	January 10, 1852	January 5, 1854	
Massachusetts		Henry Gardner	American	January 4, 1855	January 7, 1858	
Connecticut		William T. Minor	American	May 2, 1855	May 6, 1857	
New Hampshire		Ralph Metcalf	American	June 7, 1855	June 4, 1857	
Kentucky		Charles S. Morehead	American	September 4, 1855	August 30, 1859	
California		J. Neely Johnson	American	January 6, 1856	January 8, 1858	
Maryland		Thomas Holliday Hicks	American	January 13, 1858	January 8, 1862	
Texas		Sam Houston	Independent	December 31, 1859	March 28, 1861	Previously served as President of the Republic of Texas 1836–1838; 1841–1844 and Governor of Tennessee from 1827–1829
Maryland		Augustus Bradford	Union	January 8, 1862	January 10, 1866	
Ohio		John Brough	Union	January 11, 1864	August 29, 1865	Died in office

== Post-Reconstruction (1865–present) ==
State	Portrait	Governor	Party	Start of term	End of term	Notes
Alabama		Robert M. Patton	Independent	December 13, 1865	July 24, 1868	Had been a Whig prior to the Civil War
Missouri		Benjamin Gratz Brown	Liberal Republican	January 4, 1871	January 3, 1873	
West Virginia		John J. Jacob	People's Independent Party	March 4, 1871	March 4, 1877	Jacob was elected as a Democrat, and reelected under the umbrella of the People's Independent Party in 1872 after failing to win the Democratic nomination.
Maine		Harris M. Plaisted	Greenback	January 13, 1881	January 3, 1883	Also endorsed by the Democrats
Virginia		William E. Cameron	Readjuster	January 1, 1882	January 1, 1886	
North Dakota		Eli Shortridge	Democratic-Independent	January 3, 1893	January 10, 1895	
Kansas		Lorenzo D. Lewelling	Populist	January 9, 1893	January 14, 1895	
Washington		John Rankin Rogers	Populist	January 11, 1897	December 26, 1901	Also endorsed by the Democrats, became a Democrat in 1900, died in office
Colorado		Davis Hanson Waite	Populist	January 10, 1893	January 8, 1895	
Nebraska		Silas A. Holcomb	Populist	January 3, 1895	January 5, 1899	Also endorsed by the Democrats
Nevada		John Edward Jones	Silver	January 7, 1895	April 10, 1896	Died in office
Nevada		Reinhold Sadler	Silver	April 10, 1896	January 5, 1903	Succeeded to the governorship after the death of Jones
Nevada		John Sparks	Silver	January 5, 1903	May 22, 1908	Also endorsed by the Democrats, died in office
Nevada		Denver S. Dickerson	Silver	May 22, 1908	January 2, 1911	Also endorsed by the Democrats, succeeded to the governorship after the death of Sparks
South Dakota		Andrew E. Lee	Populist	January 1, 1897	January 8, 1901	
Kansas		John W. Leedy	Populist	January 11, 1897	January 9, 1899	
Nebraska		William A. Poynter	Populist	January 5, 1899	January 3, 1901	Also endorsed by the Democrats
Wyoming		Joseph M. Carey	Progressive	January 2, 1911	January 4, 1915	Elected as a Republican, became a Progressive in 1912
California		Hiram Johnson	Progressive	January 3, 1911	March 15, 1917	Elected as a Republican, became a Progressive in 1912, resigned in 1917 in order to become a U.S. Senator
Florida		Sidney Johnston Catts	Prohibition	January 2, 1917	January 4, 1921	
North Dakota		Lynn Frazier	Nonpartisan League	January 3, 1917	November 23, 1921	Recalled
North Dakota		Ragnvald Nestos	Independent Voters Association	November 23, 1921	January 7, 1925	Won the recall election
North Dakota		Arthur G. Sorlie	Nonpartisan League	January 7, 1925	August 28, 1928	Died in office
North Dakota		Walter Maddock	Nonpartisan League	August 28, 1928	January 9, 1929	Succeeded to the governorship after the death of Sorlie
North Dakota		George F. Shafer	Independent Voters Association	January 9, 1929	December 31, 1932	
Minnesota		Floyd B. Olson	Farmer–Labor	January 6, 1931	August 22, 1936	Died in office
Oregon		Julius Meier	Independent	January 12, 1931	January 14, 1935	
North Dakota		William Langer	Nonpartisan League	December 31, 1932	June 21, 1934	Removed from office in 1934, elected again in 1936
North Dakota		Ole H. Olson	Nonpartisan League	June 21, 1934	January 7, 1935	Succeeded to the governorship after the removal of Langer
North Dakota		Walter Welford	Nonpartisan League	February 2, 1935	January 6, 1937	Succeeded to the governorship after the removal of Thomas H. Moodie due to ineligibility
Minnesota		Hjalmar Petersen	Farmer–Labor	August 22, 1936	January 4, 1937	Succeeded to the governorship after the death of Olson
Minnesota		Elmer Austin Benson	Farmer–Labor	January 4, 1937	January 2, 1939	
Wisconsin		Philip La Follette	Progressive	January 7, 1935	January 2, 1939	
Wisconsin		Orland Steen Loomis	Progressive	N/A	N/A	Died a month before he was to take office
Maine		James B. Longley	Independent	January 2, 1975	January 3, 1979	
Alaska		Wally Hickel	Alaskan Independence	December 3, 1990	December 5, 1994	Previously served as a Republican from 1966–1969, became a Republican in April 1994
Connecticut		Lowell P. Weicker	A Connecticut Party	January 9, 1991	January 4, 1995	
Maine		Angus King	Independent	January 5, 1995	January 8, 2003	
Minnesota		Jesse Ventura	Reform/Independence	January 4, 1999	January 6, 2003	Elected as Reform, later switched to the Independence Party of Minnesota in 2000
Florida		Charlie Crist	Independent	January 2, 2007	January 4, 2011	Elected as a Republican, became an independent on May 13, 2010
Rhode Island		Lincoln Chafee	Independent	January 4, 2011	January 6, 2015	Switched to the Democratic Party on May 30, 2013
Alaska		Bill Walker	Independent	December 1, 2014	December 3, 2018	Also endorsed by the Democrats

== See also ==
- Third party officeholders in the United States
- List of current United States governors
- List of third party performances in United States elections
