= List of third-party and independent performances in Louisiana state legislative elections =

Hundreds of third-party and independent candidates have run for state legislative seats in the state of Louisiana. Louisiana state law disallows write-in candidates for public office. Only candidates who achieved more than 5% of the vote since 1982 are included.

== Candidate won seat outright or won runoff election ==
=== State house ===
Election	District	Party	Candidate	Race	Votes	%	Place	Ref
2019 (general)	HD 62	Independent	Roy Daryl Adams	Primary	5,854	38.0 / 100	Advanced to runoff 1st of 4	
2019 (general)	HD 62	Independent	Roy Daryl Adams	Runoff	9,491	53.3 / 100	Elected; 1st of 2	
2019 (general)	HD 85	Unaffiliated	Joseph Marino	Only candidate to file				
2019 (special)	HD 62	Independent	Roy Daryl Adams	Primary	1,556	30.8 / 100	Advanced to runoff 2nd of 5	
2019 (special)	HD 62	Independent	Roy Daryl Adams	Runoff	2,925	53.6 / 100	Elected; 1st of 2	
2016 (special)	HD 85	Unaffiliated	Joseph Marino	Only candidate to file				
2015	HD 22	Other	Terry Brown	Primary	6,627	52.4 / 100	Elected; 1st of 2	
2011	HD 22	Other	Terry Brown	Primary	4,724	33.3 / 100	Advanced to runoff 2nd of 3	
2011	HD 22	Other	Terry Brown	Runoff	6,015	52.4 / 100	Elected; 1st of 2	
2011	HD 55	Unaffiliated	Dee Richard	Primary	8,123	78.0 / 100	Elected; 1st of 2	
2007	HD 55	Unaffiliated	Dee Richard	Primary	5,562	40.7 / 100	Advanced to runoff 1st of 4	
2007	HD 55	Unaffiliated	Dee Richard	Runoff	4,120	58.6 / 100	Elected; 1st of 2	
2007	HD 45	Other	Joel Robideaux	Only candidate to file				
2004	HD 45	Other	Joel Robideaux	Primary	1,622	27.1 / 100	Advanced to runoff 2nd of 5	
2004	HD 45	Other	Joel Robideaux	Runoff	2,751	55.3 / 100	Elected; 1st of 2	
1991	HD 22	Other	Steve Gunn	Primary	6,087	32.8 / 100	Advanced to runoff 2nd of 3	
1991	HD 22	Other	Steve Gunn	Runoff	9,931	50.2 / 100	Elected; 1st of 2	
1987	HD 43	Other	Odon L. Bacque Jr.	Primary	6,473	40.0 / 100	Advanced to runoff 2nd of 3	
1987	HD 43	Other	Odon L. Bacque Jr.	Runoff	6,811	57.2 / 100	Elected; 1st of 2	

== Candidate advanced to runoff ==
=== State senate ===
Election	District	Party	Candidate	Race	Votes	%	Place	Ref
1991	SD 18	Other	Jeff Diez	Primary	20,975	44.8 / 100	Advanced to runoff 2nd of 3	
1991	SD 18	Other	Jeff Diez	Runoff	25,436	47.9 / 100	2nd of 2	

=== State house ===
Election	District	Party	Candidate	Race	Votes	%	Place	Ref
2023	HD 57	Unaffiliated	Russ Wise	Primary	1,573	15.9 / 100	Advanced to runoff 2nd of 8	
2023	HD 57	Unaffiliated	Russ Wise	Runoff	2,398	34.8 / 100	2nd of 2	
2019	HD 21	Independent	Glen B. McGlothin Jr.	Primary	3,018	23.3 / 100	Advanced to runoff 2nd of 4	
2019	HD 21	Independent	Glen B. McGlothin Jr.	Runoff	5,528	41.3 / 100	2nd of 2	
2019	HD 50	Unaffiliated	Raymond Harris Jr.	Primary	2,961	25.1 / 100	Advanced to runoff 2nd of 5	
2019	HD 50	Unaffiliated	Raymond Harris Jr.	Runoff	5,601	41.9 / 100	2nd of 2	
2015	HD 21	Other	James Barker	Primary	4,240	25.6 / 100	Advanced to runoff 2nd of 4	
2015	HD 21	Other	James Barker	Withdrew from runoff				
2011	HD 57	Unaffiliated	Russ Wise	Primary	3,768	28.8 / 100	Advanced to runoff 2nd of 5	
2011	HD 57	Unaffiliated	Russ Wise	Runoff	2,548	31.0 / 100	2nd of 2	
2011	HD 96	Other	Eric Martin	Primary	3,760	40.7 / 100	Advanced to runoff 2nd of 6	
2011	HD 96	Other	Eric Martin	Runoff	3,654	44.1 / 100	2nd of 2	
1991	HD 29	Other	Ron Johnson	Primary	3,831	33.2 / 100	Advanced to runoff 2nd of 5	
1991	HD 29	Other	Ron Johnson	Runoff	5,698	40.9 / 100	2nd of 2	

== Other candidates ==
The following candidates did not advance to a runoff, as they did not place 2nd or better in a race where no candidate earned 50% of the vote.

=== State senate ===
Election	District	Party	Candidate	Votes	%	Place	Ref
2023	SD 37	Independent	Ivan M. Scioneaux Jr.	3,197	13.4 / 100	3rd of 3	
2019	SD 6	Libertarian	Rufus H. Craig	7,596	20.5 / 100	2nd of 2	
2019	SD 24	Unaffiliated	Cory Levier I	7,922	24.5 / 100	2nd of 2	
2019	SD 37	Independent	Debbie Hollis	6,593	28.9 / 100	2nd of 2	
2015	SD 6	Unaffiliated	Eric Weil	5,208	15.7 / 100	2nd of 3	
2015	SD 16	Other	Brent Campanella	4,564	14.0 / 100	3rd of 3	
2015	SD 20	Unaffiliated	Mark Atzenhoffer	1,456	6.2 / 100	3rd of 3	
2015	SD 23	Other	Terry Hughes	5,235	16.1 / 100	2nd of 2	
2011 (special)	SD 22	Unaffiliated	David Groner	2,534	11.8 / 100	3rd of 6	
2007	SD 4	Unaffiliated	Clayton Joffrion	897	5.9 / 100	3rd of 3	
2007	SD 10	Unaffiliated	Mike Zito	8,752	31.1 / 100	2nd of 2	
2007	SD 15	Other	James E. Slaughter	5,877	19.9 / 100	2nd of 2	
2007	SD 16	Libertarian	Richard Fontanesi	3,995	9.0 / 100	3rd of 3	
2007	SD 24	Unaffiliated	Bradford Jackson	5,796	16.6 / 100	2nd of 3	
2003	SD 3	Other	Jason Neville	1,528	6.1 / 100	3rd of 3	
2003	SD 4	Other	Greg Kahn	1,366	5.1 / 100	3rd of 3	
2003	SD 39	Other	Jim Slagle	1,819	7.7 / 100	5th of 5	
1999 (general)	SD 27	Other	Thimco Francis Sr.	1,522	5.2 / 100	3rd of 3	
1999 (general)	SD 33	Other	Colvin L. Wines	2,685	8.9 / 100	2nd of 2	
Feb 1999 (special)	SD 3	Other	Leroy Douglas	757	7.3 / 100	4th of 4	
1995	SD 24	Other	John Miller	8,901	26.2 / 100	2nd of 2	
1995	SD 32	Other	Paul A. Nugent	5,048	12.5 / 100	3rd of 3	
1995	SD 36	Other	Ralph L. Rentz	4,168	16.9 / 100	2nd of 2	
1995	SD 38	Other	Jim Crowley	2,652	8.7 / 100	3rd of 3	
1991	SD 7	Other	Jim Gaudet	1,720	6.3 / 100	5th of 6	
1991	SD 10	Other	Robert V. J. Buras	3,161	9.5 / 100	3rd of 3	
1991	SD 12	Other	Roy L. Crawford	4,701	12.6 / 100	3rd of 3	
1991	SD 16	Other	Michael S. Wolf	2,391	5.3 / 100	3rd of 4	
1991	SD 21	Other	Eddie Albares	5,232	14.5 / 100	2nd of 2	
1987	SD 7	Other	Roy Juncker	5,746	24.2 / 100	2nd of 2	
1987	SD 10	Other	John W. Bode	3,389	11.5 / 100	3rd of 3	
1987	SD 11	Other	W. L. Aarden-Wells	2,617	6.2 / 100	4th of 4	
1987	SD 15	Other	Ken Ward	2,063	6.1 / 100	4th of 5	
1983	SD 36	Other	Michael Tritico	3,943	25.1 / 100	2nd of 2	

=== State house ===
Election	District	Party	Candidate	Votes	%	Place	Ref
2023	HD 19	Independent	Norm Davis	2,442	22.1 / 100	2nd of 2	
2023	HD 30	Independent	William "BJ" Jones	967	14.9 / 100	2nd of 2	
2023	HD 85	Unaffiliated	Andrew Bennett	409	6.2 / 100	3rd of 3	
2023	HD 90	Libertarian	Heide Alejandro-Smith	772	8.6 / 100	3rd of 3	
2022 (special)	HD 101	Independent	Terry Hebert	278	9.7 / 100	3rd of 3	
2019	HD 21	Independent	Clint Vegas	2,815	21.7 / 100	4th of 4	
2019	HD 24	Independent	Willie Banks	1,402	10.0 / 100	3rd of 3	
2019	HD 28	Unaffiliated	Ramondo Ramos	641	5.0 / 100	4th of 4	
2019	HD 50	Unaffiliated	Javon Charles	1,367	11.6 / 100	5th of 5	
2019	HD 62	Unaffiliated	Derald Spears Sr.	1,569	10.2 / 100	4th of 4	
2019	HD 69	Libertarian	Ryan Chase Lee	2,924	21.2 / 100	2nd of 2	
2019	HD 72	Unaffiliated	Marylee Bellau	2,268	19.1 / 100	2nd of 2	
2019	HD 90	Libertarian	Heide Alejandro-Smith	1,046	9.6 / 100	3rd of 3	
2019	HD 96	Independent	Bob Titus II	2,274	22.4 / 100	2nd of 4	
2017 (special)	HD 77	Unaffiliated	Lisa Condrey Ward	1,785	20.9 / 100	3rd of 4	
2015 (general)	HD 44	Other	Desmond Onezine	1,319	15.9 / 100	2nd of 2	
2015 (special)	HD 66	Unaffiliated	Susan Nelson	483	11.4 / 100	3rd of 4	
2011	HD 16	Unaffiliated	James M. Murphy	482	7.5 / 100	4th of 4	
2011	HD 32	Unaffiliated	John Arthur Williams	2,563	21.7 / 100	2nd of 2	
2011	HD 39	Unaffiliated	Jamie Arnaud	2,103	20.5 / 100	3rd of 3	
2011	HD 45	Libertarian	W. David Chance	1,918	21.2 / 100	2nd of 2	
2011	HD 51	Unaffiliated	Howard John Castay Jr.	2,448	28.2 / 100	2nd of 2	
2011	HD 54	Unaffiliated	Micah Hebert	3,859	41.4 / 100	2nd of 2	
2011	HD 70	Unaffiliated	Greg Baldwin	2,033	22.6 / 100	2nd of 2	
2011	HD 72	Unaffiliated	Johnny "I Can" Duncan	2,032	16.9 / 100	2nd of 2	
2011	HD 86	Unaffiliated	David Ridder	1,099	12.3 / 100	4th of 5	
2011	HD 95	Unaffiliated	Matthew Mitchell	682	6.4 / 100	3rd of 3	
2011	HD 96	Other	Vincent Alexander	509	5.5 / 100	5th of 6	
2009 (special)	HD 40	Unaffiliated	Bradford Jackson	831	13.9 / 100	4th of 10	
2007	HD 16	Unaffiliated	Benjamin P. Arnold	749	5.6 / 100	3rd of 3	
2007	HD 31	Other	Nancy Landry	7,332	49.9 / 100	2nd of 2	
2007	HD 32	Unaffiliated	Dickey Crider	714	5.3 / 100	4th of 4	
2007	HD 44	Unaffiliated	Terry C. Landry	2,090	23.1 / 100	3rd of 5	
2007	HD 64	Unaffiliated	Joe Achord	2,216	15.1 / 100	2nd of 3	
2007	HD 64	Unaffiliated	Wally North	1,170	8.0 / 100	3rd of 3	
2007	HD 91	Other	Bob Murray	407	6.3 / 100	5th of 7	
2007	HD 102	Unaffiliated	Riki Lombard	1,014	14.4 / 100	3rd of 3	
2007	HD 103	Unaffiliated	Joseph Cao	895	14.1 / 100	5th of 6	
2007 (special)	HD 40	Unaffiliated	Bradford Jackson	1,099	19.6 / 100	3rd of 6	
Dec 2004 (special)	SD 4	Other	Clayton J. Joffrion	623	8.7 / 100	2nd of 3	
Dec 2004 (special)	SD 4	Other	Adam D. Wilson	384	5.4 / 100	3rd of 3	
Sep 2004 (special)	HD 40	Other	Bradford Jackson	611	5.2 / 100	6th of 10	
Mar 2004 (special)	HD 45	Other	Beverly Broussard Wilson	652	10.9 / 100	3rd of 5	
2003	HD 24	Other	Jack Adair	1,677	11.8 / 100	3rd of 3	
2003	HD 27	Other	Pete Ferrington	4,519	39.0 / 100	2nd of 2	
2003	HD 36	Other	Mike Johnson	2,771	19.2 / 100	2nd of 2	
2003	HD 38	Other	Brent Sanders	2,336	19.4 / 100	2nd of 2	
2003	HD 39	Other	Tiger Guillory	1,714	12.0 / 100	3rd of 3	
2003	HD 58	Other	Wayne Lawson	2,357	14.5 / 100	2nd of 2	
2003	HD 69	Other	Robelynn Hood Abadie	3,091	19.5 / 100	2nd of 3	
2003	HD 84	Other	Geoffrey Charles Rodriguez	2,024	19.9 / 100	2nd of 2	
2003	HD 88	Other	Willis Blackwell	975	6.5 / 100	5th of 5	
2003	HD 93	Other	Les Evenchick	754	11.4 / 100	2nd of 2	
2003	HD 105	Other	Bobby Riggs	1,682	11.4 / 100	3rd of 4	
2003	HD 105	Other	Dan Thompson	1,152	7.8 / 100	4th of 4	
2000 (special)	HD 11	Other	Huey Dean	892	14.3 / 100	3rd of 4	
1999	HD 33	Other	R.D. Boykin	1,306	10.8 / 100	2nd of 2	
1999	HD 34	Other	Donald Jackson	687	7.0 / 100	3rd of 4	
1999	HD 58	Other	A. Wayne Lawson	928	5.9 / 100	3rd of 3	
1999	HD 67	Other	Rhadd Noel Hunt	451	7.7 / 100	3rd of 3	
1999	HD 68	Other	Glenda Natale	1,734	12.9 / 100	2nd of 2	
1999	HD 72	Other	Nick Duncan	1,472	10.2 / 100	3rd of 3	
1999	HD 100	Other	Twin Alcorn	1,345	13.2 / 100	2nd of 2	
1995	HD 24	Other	Matt Chachere	3,831	24.1 / 100	2nd of 2	
1995	HD 26	Other	Noland Howard	766	9.0 / 100	3rd of 3	
1995	HD 34	Other	D. D. Jackson	1,862	19.1 / 100	2nd of 2	
1995	HD 53	Other	Paul A. Lapeyrouse	797	7.0 / 100	5th of 6	
1995	HD 61	Other	Verna M. Bradley-Jackson	1,592	17.2 / 100	2nd of 2	
1995	HD 70	Other	Steve Myers	6,666	44.9 / 100	2nd of 2	
1995	HD 75	Other	Jacqueline Carr	916	7.1 / 100	4th of 4	
1995	HD 82	Other	Eddie Lirette	862	7.2 / 100	3rd of 3	
1995	HD 90	Other	Claire Hudock Torrey	2,313	17.4 / 100	2nd of 2	
1991 (general)	HD 7	Other	E. G. Asseff	2,451	20.4 / 100	2nd of 2	
1991 (general)	HD 9	Other	Kermit K. Westmoreland	2,983	25.9 / 100	2nd of 2	
1991 (general)	HD 15	Other	James R. Elee	882	6.4 / 100	3rd of 3	
1991 (general)	HD 80	Other	Raymond Waguespack	2,224	20.5 / 100	2nd of 2	
1991 (general)	HD 93	Other	Marilyn Jean Alexander	743	9.0 / 100	3rd of 4	
1991 (general)	HD 99	Other	Raymond Brown	1,106	10.7 / 100	2nd of 3	
Feb 1991 (special)	HD 50	Other	Pam Daniels	1,759	19.3 / 100	3rd of 4	
1987	HD 8	Other	Freddy Shewmake	3,465	29.8 / 100	2nd of 3	
1987	HD 68	Other	Ben Peabody	3,311	19.1 / 100	3rd of 3	
1987	HD 70	Other	Richard J. Brazan Jr.	1,807	9.5 / 100	4th of 4	
