= John Pendleton Jr. =

American politician

Governor of Virginia (Acting)
- In office December 11, 1799 – December 19, 1799
- Preceded by: Hardin Burnley
- Succeeded by: James Monroe

Personal details
- Born: 1749 Colony of Virginia
- Died: 1806 (aged 56–57) Richmond, Virginia, U.S.

John Pendleton Jr. (1749 – August 10, 1806) was a Virginia government official, most notably serving as the acting Governor of Virginia for eight days in December, 1799.

A nephew of Edmund Pendleton, Pendleton served as clerk of the Virginia Committee of Safety from 1775 to 1776. In 1776, the Virginia General Assembly named him the first clerk of the Senate of Virginia, and he served until June 1777. Pendleton also served on the Richmond Common Council from 1783 to 1784. From 1796 to 1802 he served as a member of the Council of State. In December 1799, James Wood resigned as governor shortly before the end of his term. Hardin Burnley, a member of the Council of Safety, was selected to act as governor for four days. Pendleton was then chosen to act as governor, and he served for eight days. He was succeeded by James Monroe.

Pendleton died in Richmond on August 10, 1806.

== Sources ==
John Pendleton Biography at National Governors Association
