= Independent Party of Louisiana =

- Dissolved: August 1, 2025
- Membership: 150,000+
- Political position: Center
- Louisiana House of Representatives: 0 / 105
- Louisiana State Senate: 0 / 39

The Independent Party of Louisiana was a third party in the U.S. state of Louisiana which became ballot-qualified in December 2016. It was dissolved on August 1, 2025. It was the third largest political party in Louisiana, behind the Democratic and Republican parties, with more than 150,000 registrants as of 2025. In 2014, the legislature repealed a law preventing political parties with the word "Independent" in the name from becoming ballot-qualified. It was not affiliated with any other third or independent party in the United States.

After bringing back party primaries in federal and some state elections, the legislature once again barred the names "Independent Party" or "Independent" for political parties. The party agreed that it should be dissolved, so that its members can vote in the Democratic and Republican primaries.

== Best results in state and federal elections ==
Source (From Secretary of State web site)

U.S. Senate campaigns
Year	Seat	Candidate	Popular votes	Percentage	Place
2022	Class III	Bradley McMorris	5,388	0.39%	9th of 13
2020	Class II	Vinny Mendoza	7,811	0.38%	11th of 15

U.S. House campaigns
Year	Seat	Candidate	Popular votes	Percentage	Place
2022	LA 3	Gloria R. Wiggins	3,255	1.45%	6th of 8
2020	LA 2	Noonie Man Batiste	12,268	3.87%	5th of 6
2018	LA 1	Fred Jones	2,443	0.91%	6th of 6
2018	LA 2	Noonie Man Batiste	17,260	7.31%	3rd of 4

Statewide executive campaigns
Year	Seat	Candidate	Popular votes	Percentage	Place
2023	Gubernatorial	Hunter Lundy	52,165	4.91%	5th of 5
2023	Gubernatorial	Benjamin Barnes	5,190	0.49%	9th of 15
2023	Gubernatorial	Jeffery Istre	3,400	0.32%	11th of 15
2023	Gubernatorial	Frank Scurlock	1,131	0.11%	15th of 15
2023	Lieutenant gubernatorial	Bruce Payton	17,195	1.66%	5th of 6
2019	Gubernatorial	Gary Landrieu	10,084	0.75%	6th of 6

== See also ==
- Political party strength in Louisiana
