= List of third-party and independent performances in Hawaii state legislative elections =

Since statehood, hundreds of third-party and independent candidates have run for state office in the state of Hawaii. Only candidates who achieved more than 5% of the vote are included.

== State senate ==
Election	District	Party	Candidate	Votes	%	Place
2022	SD 6	Green	Mish Shishido	1,056	6.7 / 100	3rd of 3
2022	SD 8	Aloha ʻĀina	Kapana Thronas-Kaho'onei	1,235	5.0 / 100	3rd of 4
2022	SD 13	Independent	Michelle Kwock	989	6.7 / 100	3rd of 4
2022	SD 13	Green	Kapono Souza	877	5.9 / 100	4th of 4
2020	SD 2	Aloha ʻĀina	Ron G. Ka-ipo	4,694	22.4 / 100	2nd of 2
2020	SD 20	Libertarian	Feena M. Bonoan	6,172	28.2 / 100	2nd of 2
2018	SD 1	Libertarian	Kimberly Arianoff	1,792	11.4 / 100	2nd of 2
2018	SD 3	Libertarian	Mike Last	2,773	18.7 / 100	2nd of 2
2018	SD 6	Green	Mish Shishido	4,379	29.7 / 100	2nd of 2
2016	SD 1	Libertarian	Kimberly Arianoff	1,816	10.4 / 100	2nd of 2
2016	SD 2	Libertarian	Frederick F. Fogel	2,488	16.3 / 100	2nd of 2
2016	SD 10	Libertarian	Arnold T. Phillips	2,712	13.7 / 100	2nd of 2
2016	SD 15	Libertarian	Roman Kalinowski	1,711	13.8 / 100	2nd of 2
2014	SD 1	Libertarian	Kobata Arianoff	1,860	12.6 / 100	2nd of 2
2014	SD 3	Libertarian	Mike Last	1,891	16.2 / 100	2nd of 2
2014	SD 4	Libertarian	Alain Schiller	2,536	20.7 / 100	2nd of 2
2014	SD 6	Libertarian	Bronson Kekahuna Kaahui	1,196	9.4 / 100	3rd of 3
2014	SD 17	Independent	Roger Clemente	3,531	27.5 / 100	2nd of 2
2008	SD 6	Independent	John Blumer-Buell	2,171	18.4 / 100	2nd of 2
2002	SD 2	Green	Kahealanikuulei Aipia	1,666	10.1 / 100	3rd of 4
1998	SD 6	Libertarian	Michael M. Dyer	1,497	8.4 / 100	3rd of 3
1998	SD 10	Libertarian	Darrel D. Gardner	2,813	20.7 / 100	2nd of 2
1998	SD 17	Libertarian	Robert Grayson	2,548	14.2 / 100	2nd of 2
1998	SD 19	Libertarian	Li Zhao	1,106	8.0 / 100	2nd of 2
1996	SD 12	Libertarian	Tracy Ahn Ryan	3,623	26.9 / 100	2nd of 2
1994	SD 24	Best	Lovell F. Kaleikini	1,183	6.8 / 100	3rd of 3
1992	SD 20	Green	Edwina A.L. Wong	752	5.6 / 100	3rd of 3
1982	SD 12	Independent	Ken Akamine	1,030	7.3 / 100	3rd of 3
1980	SD 6 (2 seats)	Libertarian	John Mills	2,177	5.1 / 100	5th of 5
1966	SD 4 (4 seats)	Independent	William H. Crozier	5,032	14.3 / 100	9th of 9
1964	SD 4 (3 seats)	Independent	William H. Crozier	7,627	9.9 / 100	7th of 7

== State house ==
Election	District	Party	Candidate	Votes	%	Place
2026	HD 14	Green	Paʻele Kiakona	2,991	41.1 / 100	Elected
2024	HD 12	Green	Rita M. Ryan	840	6.4 / 100	3rd of 3
2024	HD 48	Green	Koda Daily	1,787	14.8 / 100	2nd of 2
2022	HD 3	Aloha 'Aina	Devin McMackin	1,229	17.1 / 100	2nd of 2
2022	HD 12	Green	Summer Starr	1,111	10.3 / 100	3rd of 3
2022	HD 13	Green	Nick Nikhilananda	639	7.0 / 100	3rd of 3
2022	HD 14	Aloha 'Aina	Leonard K. Nakoa	1,037	14.3 / 100	3rd of 3
2022	HD 28	Aloha 'Aina	Ernest Caravalho	1,057	22.0 / 100	2nd of 2
2020	HD 2	Aloha 'Aina	Devin McMackin	1,589	12.9 / 100	2nd of 2
2020	HD 4	Aloha 'Aina	Desmon Haumea	1,384	11.7 / 100	3rd of 3
2020	HD 5	Libertarian	Mike Last	1,636	13.4 / 100	2nd of 3
2020	HD 5	Aloha 'Aina	Citalli Decker	843	6.9 / 100	3rd of 3
2020	HD 9	Aloha 'Aina	Kahala Jen Chrupalyk	1,383	14.6 / 100	2nd of 2
2020	HD 10	Aloha 'Aina	Travis Gyldstrand	606	5.8 / 100	3rd of 3
2020	HD 11	Aloha 'Aina	Howard E. Greenberg	2,668	22.3 / 100	2nd of 2
2020	HD 13	Aloha 'Aina	Theresa Kapaku	2,000	16.6 / 100	2nd of 3 (Note: Beat Republican nominee)
2020	HD 19	Independent	Mike Parrish	1,964	15.3 / 100	2nd of 3
2020	HD 24	Aloha 'Aina	Umi Sexton	2,121	19.7 / 100	2nd of 2
2020	HD 35	Aloha 'Aina	Keline-Kameyo Kahau	611	7.1 / 100	3rd of 3
2020	HD 43	Aloha 'Aina	Shaena Hoohuli	613	7.1 / 100	3rd of 3
2020	HD 44	Aloha 'Aina	Joseph K. Simpliciano	721	9.7 / 100	3rd of 3
2018	HD 3	Libertarian	Fred F. Fogel	1,675	20.1 / 100	2nd of 2
2018	HD 10	Green	Jen Kamaho'i Mather	1,171	17.6 / 100	3rd of 3
2018	HD 13	Green	Nick Nikhilananda	2,298	26.1 / 100	2nd of 2
2018	HD 17	Green	Alan Yim	1,694	15.2 / 100	2nd of 2
2016	HD 3	Green	Kealoha Pisciotta	1,333	14.6 / 100	2nd of 3
2016	HD 3	Libertarian	Gregory Arianoff	813	8.9 / 100	3rd of 3
2016	HD 4	Independent	Luana Jones	1,247	14.4 / 100	2nd of 3
2016	HD 4	Constitution	Mike Stephens	648	7.5 / 100	3rd of 3
2016	HD 5	Libertarian	Mike Last	1,766	19.5 / 100	2nd of 2
2016	HD 13	Green	Nick Nikhilananda	2,773	30.0 / 100	2nd of 2
2016	HD 19	Libertarian	Anthony Higa	1,173	11.2 / 100	3rd of 3
2016	HD 22	Libertarian	Michelle Rose Tippens	659	7.3 / 100	3rd of 3
2014	HD 1	Libertarian	Eric Drake Weinert	1,452	17.4 / 100	2nd of 2
2014	HD 3	Libertarian	Fred F. Fogel	811	11.2 / 100	3rd of 3
2014	HD 11	Libertarian	Pat Brock	1,362	19.6 / 100	2nd of 2
2014	HD 19	Libertarian	Susan Kehaulani	3,474	31.3 / 100	2nd of 2
2014	HD 20	Green	Keiko Bonk	2,047	23.3 / 100	2nd of 3 (Note: Beat Republican nominee)
2014	HD 41	Libertarian	Tom Berg	956	15.2 / 100	3rd of 3
2014	HD 44	Green	Cedric Asuega Gates	1,025	22.0 / 100	2nd of 3
2014	HD 44	Libertarian	Al Frenzel	722	15.5 / 100	3rd of 3
2012	HD 3	Libertarian	Frederick F. Fogel	860	9.6 / 100	3rd of 3
2012	HD 20	Green	Keiko Bonk	3,143	30.0 / 100	2nd of 3 (Note: Beat Republican nominee)
2010	HD 5	Libertarian	Fred Fogel	1,699	21.8 / 100	2nd of 2
2006	HD 4	Green	Aaron Anderson	609	8.9 / 100	3rd of 3
2002	HD 2	Green	Anuty Tu Nakkim	486	6.4 / 100	3rd of 3
2002	HD 5	Green	Jack Kelly	2,539	36.9 / 100	2nd of 3 (Note: Beat Republican nominee)
2002	HD 30	Libertarian	John Orendt	654	11.6 / 100	2nd of 2
2000	HD 4	Green	Ginny Aste	1,797	19.4 / 100	3rd of 4
2000	HD 4	Libertarian	Aaron Anderson	815	8.8 / 100	4th of 4
2000	HD 10	Aloha 'Aina	Malia Gibson	1,076	13.8 / 100	3rd of 3
2000	HD 12	Natural Law	Ann E. West-Tickle	1,133	13.3 / 100	2nd of 2
2000	HD 44	Aloha 'Aina	Morri Kamahele	673	15.0 / 100	3rd of 3
1998	HD 2	Libertarian	Jim O'Keefe	424	5.1 / 100	3rd of 3
1998	HD 4	Libertarian	Aaron Anderson	1,612	17.3 / 100	3rd of 3
1998	HD 34	Libertarian	Guy Monahan	1,193	14.2 / 100	2nd of 2
1996	HD 47	Green	Karen Archibald	1,705	20.8 / 100	3rd of 3
1994	HD 18	Green	Christopher Walker	1,281	15.8 / 100	2nd of 2
1994	HD 21	Libertarian	Alfred Nyle Roberts	314	5.6 / 100	3rd of 3
1994	HD 23	Green	Toni Worst	3,571	38.8 / 100	2nd of 2
1994	HD 40	Best	Loree Johnson	644	10.0 / 100	3rd of 3
1994	HD 41	Best	Mary Ann Miyashiro	768	9.9 / 100	3rd of 3
1994	HD 44	Best	Alvin K. Awo	830	16.8 / 100	3rd of 3
1994	HD 47	Green	Karen Archibald	2,930	36.6 / 100	2nd of 2
1994	HD 50	Green	Bruce MacPherson	807	9.1 / 100	3rd of 3
1992	HD 1	Green	Lynn Nakkim	533	6.3 / 100	3rd of 3
1992	HD 4	Green	Kristine Kubat	1,867	21.7 / 100	3rd of 3
1992	HD 19	Libertarian	Merrielera Dolle'	1,447	16.8 / 100	2nd of 2
1992	HD 21	Libertarian	Alfred Nyle Roberts	371	5.4 / 100	3rd of 3
1992	HD 23	Libertarian	Roger Lee Taylor	1,307	13.7 / 100	2nd of 2
1992	HD 25	Green	Jack Morse	454	6.5 / 100	3rd of 3
1992	HD 32	Green	Connie Beltran Chun	1,993	35.9 / 100	2nd of 3 (Note: Beat Republican nominee)
1992	HD 41	Green	Jeff Alexander	842	13.4 / 100	2nd of 2
1982	HD 12	Independent	John Del Rosario	551	8.3 / 100	3rd of 3
1982	HD 25	Independent	Gimo M. Manuel	1,774	32.4 / 100	2nd of 2
1982	HD 48	Independent	Fred G. Minuth	437	6.3 / 100	3rd of 3
1982	HD 49	Independent	Jacqueline Lewis	741	14.0 / 100	3rd of 3
1980	HD 8 (2 seats)	Libertarian	George W. Mason	1,492	12.5 / 100	3rd of 3
1980	HD 25 (2 seats)	Libertarian	Harry L. McConkey	1,464	12.7 / 100	3rd of 3
1976	HD 5 (2 seats)	Independent	Michael J. Durkan	2,900	23.2 / 100	4th of 4
1976	HD 6 (2 seats)	Independent	Johnny B. Midgett	703	5.8 / 100	4th of 4
1976	HD 11 (2 seats)	Independent	Larry Olsen	840	7.6 / 100	5th of 5
1976	HD 13 (3 seats)	Independent	Barbara Dentine	1,174	6.9 / 100	7th of 7
1976	HD 23	Independent	Debbie Figueroa	399	5.3 / 100	3rd of 3
1966	HD 7 (4 seats)	Independent	Al Klahre	1,769	12.0 / 100	9th of 9
