= Hardin Burnley =

American politician

Governor of Virginia (Acting)
- In office December 7, 1799 – December 11, 1799
- Preceded by: James Wood
- Succeeded by: John Pendleton, Jr.

Personal details
- Born: March 19, 1761 Orange County, Colony of Virginia, British America
- Died: March 11, 1809 (aged 47) Hanover County, Virginia, U.S.

Hardin Burnley (March 19, 1761 – March 11, 1809) was a Virginia lawyer and political figure who served in the Virginia House of Delegates and the Virginia Council of State. As President of the Council, Burnley was the acting Governor of Virginia for three days in 1799, pending the swearing in of James Monroe.
