= Aloha ʻĀina Party =

Political party in Hawaii

Aloha ʻĀina Party Hawaiian: ʻAoʻao Aloha ʻĀina
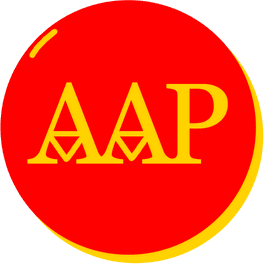
- Chairperson: Joyclynn Costa
- Founded: June 1, 2015; 11 years ago
- Headquarters: Honolulu
- Ideology: Aloha ʻĀina; Hawaii native interests Hawaiian sovereignty
- Colors: Red and yellow
- Seats in the Upper House: 0 / 25
- Seats in the Lower House: 0 / 51

Website
- www.instagram.com/votealoha/

The Aloha ʻĀina Party (Hawaiian for "love of the land") is a political party in the US state of Hawaiʻi that advocates for the Hawaiian sovereignty movement and the promotion of Native Hawaiian culture.

== History ==
The Aloha ʻĀina Party was convened in 2015 by founding members Donald Kaulia, Pua Ishibashi, and Desmon Haumea as a political action group. After two failed attempts at getting ballot access in 2016 and 2018, the party collected enough signatures to be certified as a political party for the 2020 election.

In 2020, the party fielded candidates in fifteen state legislative races on a platform to bring kanaka maoli (Native Hawaiian) values into governance. According to the Aloha ʻĀina Party Founders, the party was founded because of frustration with the state's handling of issues concerning both Kanaka Maoli as well as the citizens of Hawaiʻi at large, and the limited natural resources in Hawaiʻi including the Thirty Meter Telescope project on Mauna Kea. None of the candidates fielded by the party during the 2020 election won their races, with the two highest-performing candidates, state Senate candidate Ron Ka-Ipo and House of Representatives candidate Howard Greenberg, receiving about 20% of the vote. Other candidates averaged about 12–16% of the vote within their respective districts.

In 2022, the party nominated several candidates for local office, including one for state Senate and three for state Representative. They also nominated their first statewide candidate, Dan Decker, for the 2022 United States Senate election in Hawaii.

In 2023, the party was notified by the state Office of Elections that it failed to meet the minimum vote threshold to remain a qualified party.

In August 2024, the party did not appear on the Primary Election ballot.

The Office of Elections told the Honolulu Civil Beat that the party was still in existence as part of a June 6, 2025, report on third parties, stating that the party was seeking to regain ballot access.

== Ideology ==
According to its website, the Aloha ʻĀina party advocates for a sovereign Hawaiʻi through the framework of hoʻoponopono ("making right what is wrong"), believing the overthrow of the Hawaiian Kingdom to have been an unjust act. It also promotes other Hawaiian values such as Mālama ʻĀina ("taking care of the land") and Aloha Kānaka ("love and care for the people").

While the party brands itself largely on Native Hawaiian issues, co-founder Pua Ishibashi has stated that "the AAP is not only for Hawaiians and is not limited to Hawaiian issues. The AAP is inclusive, welcomes all, and address the needs and concerns of all the people of Hawaiʻi".

== Executive committee ==
Name	Position
Joyclynn Costa	Chair
	Vice Chair
J Kahala Chrupalyk	Secretary
J Kahala Chrupalyk	Treasurer
Puanani Rogers	Director
Duke London Kaulia	Director

== See also ==
- Green Party of Hawaii
- Democratic Party of Hawaii
- Hawaii Republican Party
