= List of third-party and independent performances in Arkansas state legislative elections =

Hundreds of third-party, independent, and write-in candidates have run for state office in the state of Arkansas. Only candidates who achieved more than 5% of the vote are included.

== State senate ==
Election	District	Party	Candidate	Votes	%	Place	Ref
2024	SD 1	Libertarian	Asher Williams	6,713	22.64 / 100	2nd of 2	
2024	SD 4	Libertarian	Lonny Mack Goodwin	5,658	19.26 / 100	2nd of 2	
2022	SD 4	Independent	Lonny Mack Goodwin	4,687	20.92 / 100	2nd of 2	
2022	SD 8	Libertarian	David Dinwiddie	5,275	27.43 / 100	2nd of 2	
2022	SD 15	Libertarian	Charles Guidry	2,625	13.85 / 100	2nd of 2	
2022	SD 16	Libertarian	Jaron Salazar	6,649	24.28 / 100	2nd of 2	
2022	SD 21	Libertarian	Alfred Jefferson Holland III	3,596	16.15 / 100	2nd of 2	
2022	SD 26	Libertarian	Gabriel Andreuccetti	4,117	16.22 / 100	2nd of 2	
2022	SD 34	Libertarian	JP DeVilliers	9,236	30.20 / 100	2nd of 2	
2022	SD 35	Libertarian	Doug Peterson	6,578	26.32 / 100	2nd of 2	
2018 (general)	SD 8	Libertarian	William Whitfield Hyman	5,698	23.68 / 100	2nd of 2	
2018 (general)	SD 10	Libertarian	Bobbi Hicks	7,989	37.59 / 100	2nd of 2	
2018 (general)	SD 17	Libertarian	Kevin Vornheder	5,321	20.10 / 100	2nd of 2	
2018 (special)	SD 8	Libertarian	William Whitfield Hyman	1,968	29.05 / 100	2nd of 2	
2016	SD 26	Libertarian	Elvis Presley	5,703	21.33 / 100	2nd of 2	
2016	SD 32	Libertarian	Jacob A. Mosier	9,351	24.98 / 100	2nd of 2	
2014	SD 14	Libertarian	George Pritchett	8,460	28.82 / 100	2nd of 2	
2012	SD	Independent	Paul White	3,540	10.34 / 100	3rd of 3	
2012	SD 25	Libertarian	David E. Dinwiddie	4,138	17.18 / 100	2nd of 2	
2012	SD 31	Libertarian	Glen Schwarz	3,917	13.83 / 100	2nd of 2	
2002	SD 5	Independent	Jimmie L. Wilson	3,859	22.26 / 100	2nd of 2	
2002	SD 16	Write-in	Rose McGee	1,555	9.97 / 100	2nd of 2	
2002	SD 31	Libertarian	Dennis Young	8,112	39.52 / 100	2nd of 2	
2000	SD 22	Independent	Brown Elliott	6,238	36.08 / 100	2nd of 2	
1992	SD 7	Independent	Tony Quinn	4,990	20.70 / 100	2nd of 3 Beat Republican	
1992	SD 34	Independent	Kim Hendren	12,314	46.47 / 100	2nd of 2	
1990	SD 27	Independent	Stanley Norriss	4,404	33.06 / 100	2nd of 3 Beat Republican	
1986	SD 21	Independent	Tony Huffman	4,297	21.64 / 100	2nd of 2	
1986	SD 30	Independent	Bill Lewellen	5,705	32.63 / 100	2nd of 2	
1984	SD 6	Independent	Charles S. Howard	1,991	12.82 / 100	2nd of 2	
