= List of justices of the Alaska Supreme Court =

This is a list of persons who have served as justices of the Alaska Supreme Court.

== List of justices ==
#	Justice	Hometown	Born–died	Began term	Ended term	Term as chief justice	Appointed by	Reason for termination
1	Buell A. Nesbett	Anchorage	1910–1993	August 1959	March 1970	1959–1970	Egan (D)	resignation
2	John H. Dimond	Juneau	1918–1985	August 1959	November 30, 1971	—	Egan (D)	resignation
3	Walter Hartman Hodge	Nome	1896–1975	August 1959	March 1960	—	Egan (D)	appointed to D. Alaska
4	Harry Arend	Fairbanks	1903–1966	May 1960	January 1965	—	Egan (D)	lost retention election
5	Jay Rabinowitz	Fairbanks	1927–2001	March 8, 1965	February 28, 1997	1972–1975; 1978–1981; 1984–1987; 1990–1992	Egan (D)	mandatory retirement
6	Roger G. Connor	Anchorage	1926–1999	December 2, 1968	May 1, 1983	—	Hickel (R)	resignation
7	George Frank Boney	Anchorage	1930–1972	December 2, 1968	August 30, 1972	1970–1972	Hickel (R)	death
8	Robert Erwin	Anchorage	1934–2020	August 3, 1970	April 15, 1977	—	Miller (R)	resignation
9	Robert Boochever	Juneau	1917–2011	March 22, 1972	October 1980	1975–1978	Egan (D)	appointed to 9th Cir.
10	James Martin Fitzgerald	Anchorage	1920–2011	December 1972	March 1975	—	Egan (D)	elevation to D. Alaska
11	Edmond W. Burke	Anchorage	1935–2020	April 4, 1975	December 1, 1993	1981–1984	Hammond (R)	resignation
12	Warren Matthews	Anchorage	1939–	May 26, 1977	April 5, 2009	1987–1990; 1997–2000	Hammond (R)	mandatory retirement
13	Allen T. Compton	Juneau	1938–2008	December 12, 1980	November 1998	1995–1997	Hammond (R)	resignation
14	Daniel A. Moore Jr.	Anchorage	1933–2022	July 10, 1983	December 1995	1992–1995	Sheffield (D)	resignation
15	Robert L. Eastaugh	Anchorage	1943–	April 18, 1994	November 2, 2009	—	Hickel (AI)	resignation
16	Dana Fabe	Anchorage	1951–	January 1996	June 2016	2000–2003; 2006–2009; 2012–2015	Knowles (D)	resignation
17	Alex Bryner	Anchorage	1943–	February 1997	October 2007	2003–2006	Knowles (D)	resignation
18	Walter L. Carpeneti	Juneau	1945–	November 1998	January 2013	2009–2012	Knowles (D)	resignation
19	Daniel Winfree	Fairbanks	1953–	January 2008	February 6, 2023	2021–2023	Palin (R)	mandatory retirement
20	Morgan Christen	Anchorage	1961–	April 5, 2009	January 10, 2012	—	Palin (R)	appointed to 9th Cir.
21	Craig Stowers	Anchorage	1954–2022	December 3, 2009	June 1, 2020	2015–2018	Parnell (R)	resignation
22	Peter J. Maassen	Anchorage	1955–	August 9, 2012	January 13, 2025	2023–2025	Parnell (R)	mandatory retirement
23	Joel Bolger	Anchorage	1955–	February 1, 2013	June 30, 2021	2018–2021	Parnell (R)	resignation
24	Susan M. Carney	Fairbanks	1962–	June 2016	incumbent	2025–present	Walker (I)	—
25	Dario Borghesan	Fairbanks	1979–	July 1, 2020	incumbent	—	Dunleavy (R)	—
26	Jennifer S. Henderson	Anchorage	1976–	July 7, 2021	incumbent	—	Dunleavy (R)	—
27	Jude Pate	Sitka	—	March 22, 2023	incumbent	—	Dunleavy (R)	—
28	Aimee A. Oravec	—	—	January 31, 2025	incumbent	—	Dunleavy (R)	—

== Chief justices ==
The Supreme Court had only one chief justice, Buell Nesbett, during its first decade of existence. Alaska voters approved a constitutional amendment in 1970, months after Nesbett's retirement, which set the current limits for chief justices, namely that they are allowed to serve three-year non-consecutive terms.

Chief Justice
Nesbett	1959–1970
Boney	1970–1972
Rabinowitz	1972–1975
Boochever	1975–1978
Rabinowitz	1978–1981
Burke	1981–1984
Rabinowitz	1984–1987
Matthews	1987–1990
Rabinowitz	1990–1992
Moore	1992–1995
Compton	1995–1997
Matthews	1997–2000
Fabe	2000–2003
Bryner	2003–2006
Fabe	2006–2009
Carpeneti	2009–2012
Fabe	2012–2015
Stowers	2015–2018
Bolger	2018–2021
Winfree	2021–2023
Maassen	2023–2025
Carney	2025–present

== Succession of seats ==
Seat 1
Seat established 1959
Nesbett	1959–1970
Erwin	1970–1977
Matthews	1977–2009
Christen	2009–2012
Maassen	2012–2025
Oravec	2025–present

Seat 2
Seat established 1959
Dimond	1959–1971
Boochever	1972–1980
Compton	1980–1998
Carpeneti	1998–2013
Bolger	2013–2021
Henderson	2021–present

Seat 3
Seat established 1959
Hodge	1959–1960
Arend	1960–1965
Rabinowitz	1965–1997
Bryner	1997–2007
Winfree	2008–2023
Pate	2023–present

Seat 4
Seat established 1968
Connor	1968–1983
Moore	1983–1995
Fabe	1996–2016
Carney	2016–present

Seat 5
Seat established 1968
Boney	1968–1972
Fitzgerald	1972–1975
Burke	1975–1993
Eastaugh	1994–2009
Stowers	2009–2020
Borghesan	2020–present

== Retention election history ==
Justices face a retention election in the first regularly scheduled election after they have served three full years, and every ten years thereafter. Only one justice, Harry Arend, has lost a retention election.

Election Year	Justice Name	Yes Votes	Percentage	No Votes	Percentage
1962	Nesbett	37,872	72.1%	14,679	27.9%
1962	Dimond	38,873	73.4%	14,083	26.6%
1964	Arend	29,884	46.7%	34,055	53.3%
1968	Rabinowitz	48,484	65.3%	25,802	34.7%
1972	Connor	63,502	72.8%	23,752	27.2%
1974	Erwin	54,907	67.5%	26,460	32.5%
1976	Boochever	73,062	67.3%	35,476	32.7%
1978	Burke	73,841	68.6%	33,806	31.4%
1978	Rabinowitz	72,978	67.8%	34,729	32.2%
1980	Matthews	75,991	53.5%	66,095	46.5%
1982	Connor	104,275	61.5%	65,240	38.5%
1984	Compton	125,759	69.6%	54,968	30.4%
1986	Moore	107,420	69.0%	48,159	31.0%
1988	Burke	124,827	73.0%	46,124	27.0%
1988	Rabinowitz	100,789	59.1%	69,707	40.9%
1990	Matthews	110,036	65.1%	58,897	34.9%
1994	Compton	119,089	64.3%	66,157	35.7%
1998	Eastaugh	127,794	64.9%	69,031	35.1%
2000	Bryner	138,749	61.4%	87,347	38.6%
2000	Fabe	130,620	57.1%	98,183	42.9%
2000	Matthews	134,657	60.8%	86,806	39.2%
2002	Carpeneti	130,566	66.7%	65,117	33.3%
2008	Eastaugh	172,440	63.5%	98,944	36.5%
2010	Fabe	126,885	54.4%	106,524	45.6%
2012	Winfree	165,777	64.9%	89,553	35.1%
2014	Stowers	146,829	62.9%	86,534	37.1%
2016	Bolger	157,225	57.9%	114,440	42.1%
2016	Maassen	154,304	57.5%	114,205	42.5%
2020	Carney	200,598	63.0%	117,660	37.0%
