= Tobeluk v. Lind =

Court case about Native Alaskan education

- Court: Alaska Supreme Court
- Full case name: Anna Tobeluk and Henry A. Tobeluk, minors, by their father and next friend John Tobeluk, et al., Appellants, v. Marshall L. Lind, as Commissioner of Education, et al., Appellees.
- Decided: January 26, 1979
- Citation: 589 P.2d 873

Court membership
- Judges sitting: Robert Boochever, Jay Rabinowitz, Roger G. Connor, Edmond W. Burke, Warren W. Matthews Jr.

Case opinions
- Decision by: Connor
- Concurrence: Matthews
- Concur/dissent: Rabinowitz, Boochever

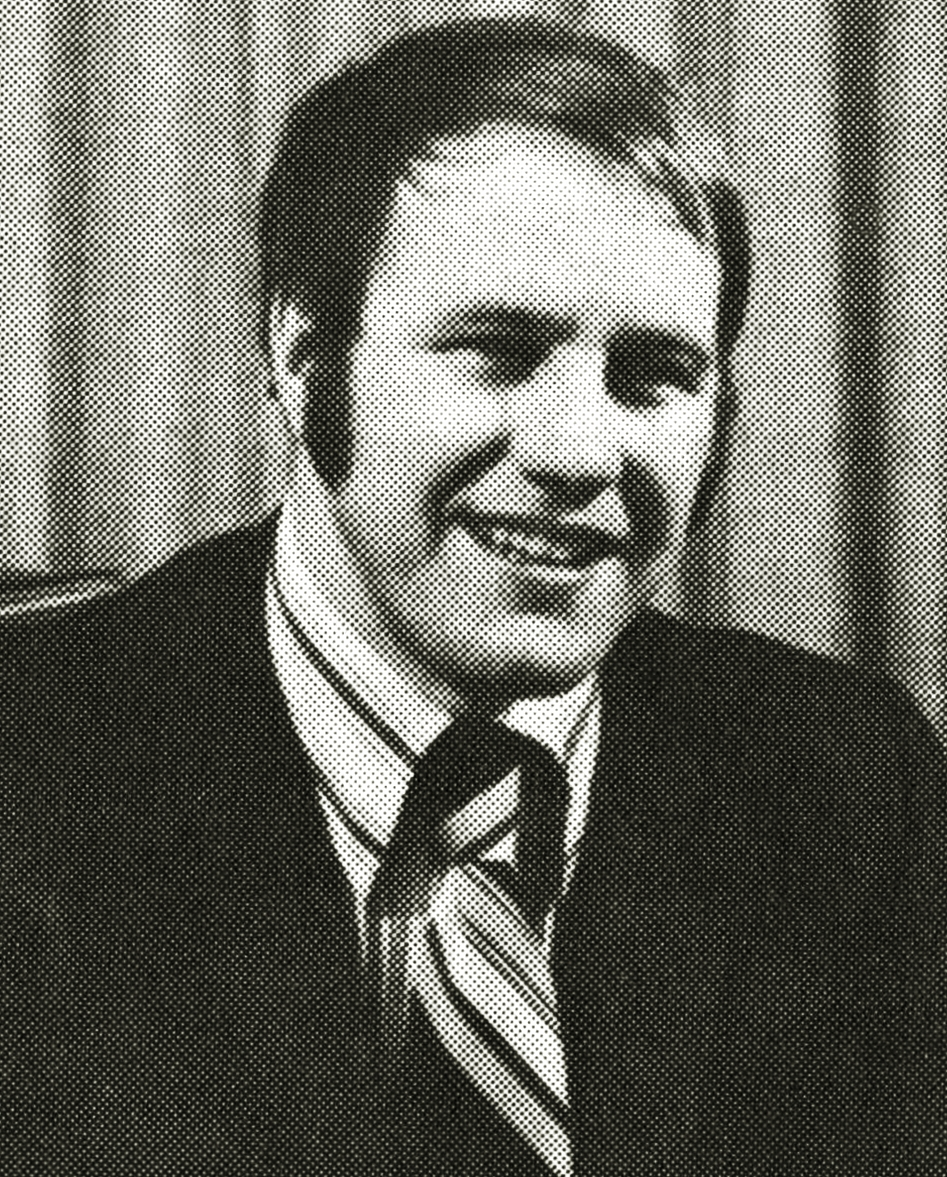
Marshall Lind (shown in 1973) was commissioner of the Alaska Department of Education from 1971 to 1982. He was the lawsuit's named defendant by virtue of his position.

Tobeluk vs. Lind, 589 P.2d 873, is a landmark case in Alaskan Native education. The 27 teenage plaintiffs brought suit against the State of Alaska, claiming that Native American boarding schools were discriminatory and unjust. The case is widely known as the "Molly Hootch Case" after the first plaintiff named.

At the time of the case, Alaskan Native parents were forced to send their children away for schooling because of a lack of quality local educational facilities in their towns. Boarding schools had historically been used as a tactic of assimilating Native students into white culture. Alaskan Native children were sent far from their parents for their secondary education, often heading to the contiguous 48 states and boarding with local non-Native families. They were thus immersed in a situation that was both geographically (Oregon, Oklahoma, etc.) and culturally removed from their place of origin. The plaintiffs alleged that this situation led to mistreatment of the Native students and a high dropout rate among them (65% within two years, in one documented case), signs of educational inequality.

In October 1976, the signing of the Tobeluk Consent Decree committed the government to building local high schools in Alaska, which they have since done with positive results on retention rates. The state by means of the consent decree agreed to create a secondary school in any village with at least fifteen high school-aged children.
