= Dana Fabe =

American judge (born 1951)

Associate Justice of the Alaska Supreme Court
- In office March 1996 – June 1, 2016
- Appointed by: Tony Knowles
- Preceded by: Daniel A. Moore Jr.
- Succeeded by: Susan M. Carney

Personal details
- Born: March 29, 1951 (age 75) Cincinnati, Ohio, U.S.
- Spouse: Randall Simpson
- Children: 1
- Education: Cornell University (BA); Northeastern University (JD)

Dana Anderson Fabe (born March 29, 1951) is an American lawyer, retired judge, and mediator. She served as a justice of the Alaska Supreme Court from 1996 to 2016, including three terms (2000–2003, 2006–2009, and 2012–2015) as the court's chief justice. She previously served as an Alaska trial court judge for nearly eight years, from 1988 to 1996. Fabe was the first woman appointed to the Alaska Supreme Court, as well as its first female chief justice.

== Early life and education ==
Fabe was born in Cincinnati, Ohio in 1951. She grew up in Hyde Park, a Cincinnati neighborhood, and attended the Seven Hills School in the city. She earned a Bachelor of Arts degree from Cornell University in Ithaca, New York in 1973 and a Juris Doctor degree from the Northeastern University School of Law in Boston in 1976.

== Career ==
After completing law school in 1976, Fabe moved to Alaska for a clerkship with Justice Edmond W. Burke on the Alaska Supreme Court. After a year there, in 1977 she accepted a position as a staff attorney for the Alaska Public Defender Agency, working in appeals, then misdemeanor trials, next in felony trials, and then becoming the head of the appellate division. In 1981, she was appointed by Governor Jay Hammond as the chief public defender for Alaska, replacing Brian Shortell when he was appointed as a judge. She served in that position until 1988, when she became a judge.

In 1988, Governor Steve Cowper appointed Fabe to the Alaska Superior Court in Anchorage. She served as a judge on the court from 1988 to 1996, including serving as the deputy presiding judge of the Third Judicial District from 1992 to 1995, and as a training judge for the district. In March 1996, Governor Tony Knowles appointed Fabe to the Alaska Supreme Court, to fill the seat vacated by the retirement of Justice Daniel A. Moore Jr. Her fellow justices elected her three times to a three-year term as the court's chief justice (2000–2003, 2006–2009, and 2012–2015). She was the first woman to serve as justice and as chief justice, and the second individual to serve three terms as chief justice, after Jay Rabinowitz who served four.

After the retirement of Justice David Souter from the Supreme Court of the United States in 2009, U.S. Senator Mark Begich recommended her as a possible successor in a letter to President Barack Obama. During her terms as chief justice one of the areas on which she focused was outreach to tribal courts. An Indian Law and Order Commission report in 2013 of its investigation into public safety and justice system in Alaska Native villages, commended her efforts to adapt traditional Native practices in sentencing, calling them "innovative, impressive and welcome." Fabe retired from the bench on June 1, 2016. She continued to serve Alaska appellate courts as needed, as a pro tempore judge and she has conducted a private mediation practice.

== Professional organizations and honors ==
Fabe is a sustaining elected member of the American Law Institute, a Life Fellow of the American Bar Foundation, a former president of the National Association of Women Judges, and a former member of the board of directors and second vice president of the Conference of Chief Justices.

She received the Sandra Day O’Connor Civic Outreach Award from the National Center for State Courts in 2017, the Distinguished Service Award from the same organization in 2012, and the Justice Vaino Spencer Leadership Award from the National Association of Women Judges in 2012. She was named as a member of the inaugural class of the Alaska Women's Hall of Fame in 2009, and as a Woman of Achievement by the YWCA in 2002.

== Personal life ==
Fabe is married to Randall Simpson. They have a daughter and at least one grandchild. She has been an active supporter of arts, civic, and various community organizations including being a trustee of the Anchorage Museum and the Soroptimists.

== See also ==
- List of female state supreme court justices

Legal offices
Preceded by Brian Shortell	Chief Public Defender for Alaska; August 1981 – August 1988	Succeeded by John B. Salemi
Preceded by Seaborn Buckalew Jr.	Judge, Alaska Superior Court, Anchorage; August 26, 1988 – January 1996	Succeeded by Eric Sanders
Preceded by Daniel Alton Moore Jr.	16th Justice of the Alaska Supreme Court; January 26, 1996 – June 1, 2016	Succeeded by Susan M. Carney
Preceded by Warren Matthews	13th Chief Justice of the Alaska Supreme Court; July 1, 2000 – June 30, 2003	Succeeded by Alex Bryner
Preceded by Alex Bryner	15th Chief Justice of the Alaska Supreme Court; July 1, 2006 – June 30, 2009	Succeeded by Walter L. Carpeneti
Preceded by Walter L. Carpeneti	17th Chief Justice of the Alaska Supreme Court; July 1, 2012 – June 30, 2015	Succeeded by Craig Stowers
