= Alaska v. Amerada Hess =

15-year-long civil lawsuit

Alaska v. Amerada Hess et al.
- Court: Alaska Supreme Court, Ninth Circuit Court of Appeals
- Full case name: State of Alaska v. Amerada Hess et al.
- Decided: July 8, 1997
- Citation: 1JU-77-877

Court membership
- Judges sitting: Walter Carpeneti, Andrew Kleinfeld, Robert C. Belloni (Federal Court)

Keywords
- Oil industry malfeasance; Royalty dispute; Alaska politics

Alaska v. Amerada Hess et al., officially known as State v. Amerada Hess et al. (1JU-77-877) was a 15-year-long civil lawsuit levied by the state of Alaska against 17 of the world's largest oil companies for underpayment of oil production royalties. The case was named after Amerada Hess, the first company in the alphabetical list of defendants. The case cost the state more than $100 million to prosecute, and all 17 companies settled out of court rather than face trial. The total settlements amounted to just over $600 million of the $902 million the state alleged had been underpaid. Additional settlements covering underpaid natural gas royalties and refining royalties amounted to another $400 million.

Under a law passed by the Alaska Legislature, the settlement money was invested in a separate account of the Alaska Permanent Fund. The Amerada Hess account, worth more than $424 million as of June 30, 2013, may not be used for the payment of Alaska Permanent Fund Dividends and instead is used for infrastructure projects. Since the case was settled, it has been used as an example of oil industry malfeasance in political and popular arguments.

== Background ==
In 1955, representatives from across Alaska met at the University of Alaska to draft the Alaska Constitution, a document that would not become effective until 1959, when Alaska became a state. Many of the delegates were aware that the new state would be heavily dependent upon development of its natural resources, an attitude typified by a speech made by Bob Bartlett, then Alaska's non-voting delegate to Congress: "The financial welfare of the future state and the well-being of its present and unborn citizens depend upon the wise administration and oversight of these [resource] development activities, [and] without adequate safeguards, the state of Alaska will wend a precarious way along the road that leads eventually to financial insolvency."

In response to the concerns of Bartlett and others, the resulting constitution requires the Alaska Legislature to maximize resource development for the "benefit of its people." To provide a concrete tool for that goal, the constitution authorizes legislators to "provide for the leasing of ... any part of the public domain."

While most governments at the time raised revenue through production taxes, conservation taxes, income taxes and property taxes, allowing the leasing of public land meant the state could also garner bonuses, rent, and royalties from anyone leasing public land for development. In Alaska, especially in relation to oil production, a bonus is the amount paid by a company for the right to lease a piece of property. Rent is the amount paid on a regular basis to maintain that lease. A royalty is a portion of anything produced by that piece of land.

After statehood, one of the first actions of the Alaska Legislature was to pass the Alaska Lands Act, which established the framework for Alaska's oil revenue system. The Alaska Lands Act created a bonus and rent system and established that the state must collect a royalty of at least 12.5 percent from its leased public land. To implement the Alaska Lands Act, the state created a master lease agreement, named DL-1. Under the terms of the agreement, the royalty (which could be paid in oil or cash value) was to be assessed on the value of the oil "at the well."

In 1964, oil companies began exploring state land on Alaska's North Slope for oil deposits. On. December 26, 1967, the 40-person crew of Prudhoe Bay State No. 1 well heard a noise that one geologist said sounded like the rumbling of four jumbo jets. It was an enormous plume of natural gas signifying the discovery of the Prudhoe Bay Oil Field. On September 10, 1969, the state held an oil lease sale for Prudhoe Bay and netted more than $900 million. Eight years and one of the world's largest construction projects later, the Trans-Alaska Pipeline System was ready to ship its first oil to Valdez, Alaska and shipment outside the state.

In the weeks before shipments began, the state learned that the oil companies had a different interpretation of the terms of DL-1 than the state did. The state sent letters and proposals to resolve the agreement, then set a deadline of September 1, 1977, for them to respond. When no response was received, the state filed a formal court complaint in Alaska Superior Court against all 18 companies leasing oil-producing ground on the North Slope.

== Charges ==
In its complaint against the oil companies, the state said the oil companies were interpreting the phrase "at the well" incorrectly and were thus violating the terms of the Prudhoe Bay lease agreement. This came to be known as the "where" argument. At Prudhoe Bay, crude oil comes out of the ground thick, under great pressure, and mixed with substances including water, butane and pentane. During the crude oil production process, the pressure must be reduced and suspended substances must be removed. Only once this has taken place does the oil enter the Trans-Alaska Pipeline system at Pump Station No. 1. At the pump station are "Lease Automatic Custody Meters" that measure the flow through the pipeline. The state argued that the proper place to measure the royalty oil was at the LACT meters, after it had been purified and readied for transport. This oil was worth more than the raw crude oil, and the oil companies favored a measuring point before purification. Such a measurement would lower their royalty payments to the state because the oil would be worth less.

The state also said producers were incorrectly valuing the royalty oil in their reports to the state and improperly "determining, allocating, computing or otherwise accounting" for expenses that could be deducted from royalty payments. According to the master lease, the state's royalty value was supposed to be the highest of three formulas: the actual market price at the well; the posted price at the field; or the prevailing price other producers got at the well. None of those methods worked at Prudhoe Bay because there were no buyers on the North Slope. In place of those formulas, the state figured out a "netback" pricing formula to determine the value of the oil at the oil well by subtracting transportation costs from a hypothetical value at one of two markets, the West Coast or the Gulf Coast. The state alleged that the oil companies understated the value of their oil and overstated their transportation costs.

== 'Where' argument ==
In November 1977, the state of Alaska filed for summary judgment on the first count of its lawsuit, the so-called "where" argument. The state argued that using the LACT meters as a measuring point was an appropriate interpretation of "at the well," because before that point, the oil was not marketable and ready for transport. In oral arguments before Alaska Superior Court judge Allen Compton in December 1978, the state compared oil extraction to the logging industry. When a tree is cut down, it must first be stripped of branches and bark before it is taken to a mill for refinement into lumber. The state also pointed to the fact that oil fields on the Kenai Peninsula and Cook Inlet had used LACT meters as the definition of "at the well" with no prior argument.

The oil companies responded that using the LACT meters was a practice inspired by federal rules, and when the state crafted its constitution, it had intended to move away from federal rules. Therefore, it was not appropriate to base Prudhoe Bay royalties on prior practices established in southern Alaska before statehood.

In April 1979, Compton ruled in favor of the state, saying the LACT meters were the appropriate point for measurement and that it was improper to take deductions before that point. Following his initial ruling, however, the process of reviewing his decision turned into a 17-month affair that ended in August 1980 when the litigants agreed to settle the issue out of court. Both sides agreed that the LACT meters were the correct location for measurement, but the state agreed to allow a field cost deduction of 42 cents per barrel for pre-1980 oil and 42 cents times the result of the Producer Price Index for the previous year, divided by the PPI for June 1977, for post-1980 oil.

== Delays ==
In the years that followed the settlement on count one of the lawsuit, the case was repeatedly delayed by the legal maneuvering of both parties. Contemporary and historical accounts, however, place most of the blame for the delays on the oil companies. "The disputed millions of dollars, after all, were literally in [the oil companies'] pockets; they were making interest on it, and they were in no hurry to get rid of it," wrote William Johnson in a history of the case.

Judge Compton stepped down from the case for personal reasons and was replaced by Rodger Pegues in 1982. Soon after his appointment, it was revealed that he had worked for several oil companies as an attorney in Alaska. This created a potential conflict of interest, and Superior Court Judge Walter Carpeneti replaced Pegues on September 9, 1983. In December 1982, Bill Sheffield, a Democrat, replaced Jay Hammond, a Republican as governor of Alaska. Under the new administration, the state became more aggressive about prosecuting its case. In spring 1983, the state amended its lawsuit with a claim for damages, saying producers had shorted it $902 million between 1977 and 1986. Since six years of royalties were contested, the state was persuaded that it was owed a sizable amount.

As the case moved into its discovery phase, the state requested several years' worth of oil company records but was met with stern opposition. The companies involved believed that those records could provide an advantage to their competitors if they were made public. In 1984, the state agreed to a protective order: The records taken in discovery could be labeled either confidential or "highly confidential." Under the former designation, they were kept with normal courtroom secrecy. Under the latter designation, the documents were kept under tighter protection determined by both sides in the lawsuit.

== Federal court ==
In 1987, one day before Judge Carpeneti was to set a trial date, Standard Oil, Chevron Corporation and Exxon asked to transfer the case to federal court. Based on the existence of the Alaska Permanent Fund, they claimed that they could not receive a fair trial in Alaska because any potential jurors were potential recipients of the proceeds of the case. The Permanent Fund, established by governor Hammond to receive profits from the state's oil taxation and royalty system, is designed to distribute an annual dividend payment to all Alaska residents who have lived in the state for at least one year. In their complaint, the companies said a trial could result in a $2 billion windfall for the state, worth $1,200 per Alaskan if distributed through the Permanent Fund.

Federal district court judge Andrew Kleinfeld heard the case but recused himself because he was an Alaska resident and thus a Permanent Fund Dividend recipient. The Ninth Circuit Court of Appeals assigned Robert C. Belloni, a non-Alaskan, to the case. In June 1988, he ruled that the case could go forward but that there were constitutional concerns that needed to be addressed. The oil companies appealed to the Ninth Circuit Court in an attempt to have the lawsuit thrown out, based on Belloni's findings, but the court ruled that would be premature without giving the state time to respond. In 1989 and again in 1991, the Alaska Legislature passed legislation that required any proceeds from the Amerada Hess case be set aside in a separate account of the Permanent Fund, inaccessible to the dividend program. The U.S. Supreme Court decided not to hear an appeal of the Ninth Circuit's decision, and the case returned to Alaska Superior Court, where it moved toward trial.

== Settlement ==
Starting in 1989, the oil companies sued by the state of Alaska began to settle out of court rather than face a trial. Amerada Hess Corp. was the pioneer of this approach, agreeing in December 1989 to pay the state $319,000 to settle its part of the lawsuit, the full amount claimed by the state plus costs, interest and attorneys' fees. ARCO, which was accused of shorting the state of more than $320 million in royalty payments and interest, was the second company to settle. It paid $287 million, about 60 percent of the amount the state was seeking, and the state agreed to drop a $100 million fraud lawsuit against ARCO as well.

The two settlements set a precedent, and one by one, other producers settled with the state. The lone holdout was Exxon, which was alleged to owe $170 million. It waited until the day jury selection began before agreeing to pay $128.5 million to close the case.

While Exxon was the last of the defendants in the original Amerada Hess case, the state spent four more years prosecuting lawsuits against subsidiary companies affected by the issue. These included refineries and companies that produced or transported liquefied natural gas products through the Trans-Alaska pipeline system. The last of these cases was settled out of court in April 1995, putting an end to the last aspects of the Amerada Hess case.

== After the lawsuit ==
In total, the state spent nearly $100 million building its lawsuit and earned about $1 billion in total settlements. The result of the case have been contested as either a victory for the oil companies or for the state. While Alaska's government received almost $1 billion in windfall revenue, it gave up hundreds of millions of dollars to achieve that settlement. The size of the case and the time needed to achieve a result has resulted in it becoming a common example of the need in Alaska politics to keep a careful watch on oil company activities.

Under the 1991 legislation approved by the Alaska Legislature, 75 percent of the Amerada Hess proceeds were deposited in the Alaska Constitutional Budget Reserve. The remaining quarter was deposited in a special account of the Alaska Permanent Fund. According to the 2013 annual report of the Alaska Permanent Fund Corporation, the Hess account had a balance of $424,399,000 as of June 30, 2013.
