= Robert Erwin =

American lawyer and judge (1934–2020)

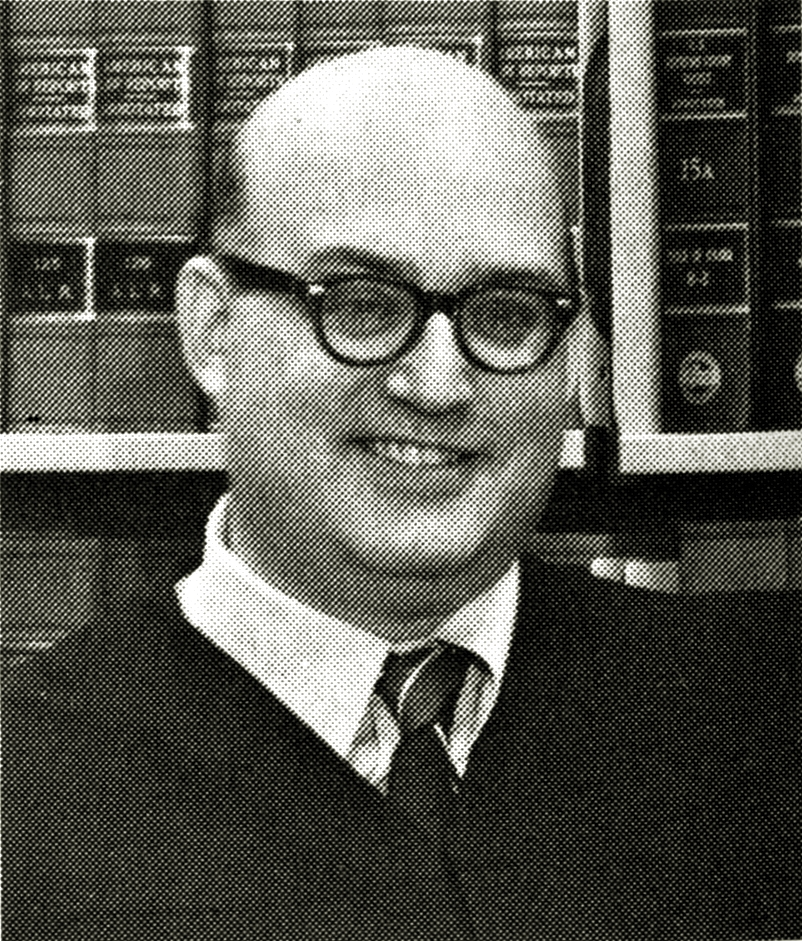

Robert Cecil Erwin (December 29, 1934 – January 24, 2020) was an American lawyer who served as a justice of the Alaska Supreme Court from August 3, 1970, to April 15, 1977. Born in Seward, Alaska, his older brother, William Matthews Erwin, was elected to represent the eastern Kenai Peninsula in the 1st and 2nd state legislatures.

Robert Erwin was a state prosecutor for the Nome area in the 1960s. He took the Alaska state bar examination in July 1960. As a prosecutor, he handled cases as mundane as failure to pay state school taxes and as exotic as unlicensed polar bear hunting.

Erwin was appointed to the court by Governor Keith Harvey Miller and was only the second Democrat to be appointed. Erwin was the only Alaskan-born justice until the 2007 appointment of Daniel Winfree. After seven years on the court, Erwin resigned, saying, "this is a crazy job and you sure can't help people from here". He returned to private practice in Anchorage. He said that as a private attorney he would be "able to take public stands" on political matters. From 2002 to 2003, he served as the only Catholic member of a panel convened to investigate and report on sexual abuse of minors by the Catholic Church in Alaska.

Political offices
Preceded by George F. Boney	Justice of the Alaska Supreme Court; 1970–1977	Succeeded by Warren Matthews
