= 2016 Alaska elections =

2016 general election for Alaska, USA

- November 8, 2016

A general election was held in the state of Alaska on November 8, 2016. Primary elections were held on August 16. Along with the presidential election, races for Alaska's at-large congressional district, 10 of the 20 seats in the Alaska Senate and all 40 seats in the Alaska House of Representatives were on the ballot.

== Federal races ==
=== U.S. President ===
2016 U.S. presidential election in Alaska
Party	Candidate	Votes	%
Republican	Donald Trump	163,387	51.28%
Democratic	Hillary Clinton	116,454	36.55%
Libertarian	Gary Johnson	18,725	5.88%
Green	Jill Stein	5,735	1.80%
Constitution	Darrell Castle	3,866	1.21%
Reform	Rocky De La Fuente	1,240	0.39%
Write-in		9,201	2.89%
Total votes		318,608	100%

=== U.S. House of Representatives ===
2016 Alaska U.S. House of Representatives general election
Party	Candidate	Votes	%
Republican	Don Young (incumbent)	155,088	50.32%
Democratic	Steve Lindbeck	111,019	36.02%
Libertarian	Jim McDermott	31,770	10.31%
NA	Bernie Souphanavong	9,093	2.95%
Write-ins	Others	1,228	0.40%
Majority		44,069	14.30%
Total votes		308,198	100%
Republican hold			

=== U.S. Senate ===
2016 United States Senate election in Alaska
Party	Candidate	Votes	%
Republican	Lisa Murkowski (Incumbent)	138,149	44.36%
Libertarian	Joe Miller	90,825	29.16%
Independent	Margaret Stock	41,194	13.23%
Democratic	Ray Metcalfe	36,200	11.62%
Independent	Breck A. Craig	2,609	0.84%
Independent	Ted Gianoutsos	1,758	0.56%
Write-In	Other write-in votes	706	0.23%
Total votes		311,441	100.00%
Republican hold			

== State races ==
=== State judiciary ===
==== State Supreme Court ====
Two justices on the Alaska Supreme Court were up for retention in 2016.

===== Justice Bolger retention =====
Justice Joel Bolger was appointed by Governor Sean Parnell in 2013.

Results by state house district Yes: 50–60%; 60–70%; 70–80%; No: 50–60%

Justice Bolger retention, 2016
Choice	Votes	%
For	157,225	57.87
Against	114,440	42.13
Total	271,665	100.00

===== Justice Maassen retention =====
Justice Peter J. Maassen was appointed by Governor Sean Parnell in 2012.

Results by state house district Yes: 50–60%; 60–70%; 70–80%; No: 50–60%

Justice Maassen retention, 2016
Choice	Votes	%
For	154,304	57.47
Against	114,205	42.53
Total	268,509	100.00

==== Court of Appeals ====
In the Alaska Court of Appeals, Judge Marjorie Allard was up for retention. She was appointed by Governor Sean Parnell in 2012.

Results by state house district Yes: 50–60%; 60–70%; 70–80%; No: 50–60%

Judge Allard retention, 2016
Choice	Votes	%
For	164,890	62.21
Against	100,171	37.79
Total	265,061	100.00

=== State legislature ===
==== Alaska House of Representatives ====
2016 Alaska House of Representatives election
Party	Votes	Percentage	Not up	Contested	Before	After	+/–
Republican	136,723	51.24%	0	31	23	21	▼2
Democratic	102,277	38.33%	0	32	16	17	▲1
Independent	16,669	6.25%	0	8	1	2	▲1
Constitution	4,634	1.74%	0	4	0	0	Steady
Alaskan Independence	730	0.27%	0	1	0	0	Steady
Write-ins	5,791	2.17%	0	40	0	0	Steady

Party	Leader	Seats
Coalition	Bryce Edgmon	22 (Note: 3 Republicans and 2 Independents joined all 17 Democrats to form a governing coalition.)
Republican	Charisse Millett	18
Total		40

==== Alaska Senate ====
2016 Alaska Senate election
Party	Votes	Percentage	Not up	Contested	Before	After	+/–
Republican	80,123	59.96%	7	7	14	14	Steady
Democratic	36,138	27.05%	3	3	6	6	Steady
Independent	14,610	10.93%	0	3	0	0	Steady
Write-ins	2,749	2.06%	0	10	0	0	Steady

== Ballot measures ==
Two statewide ballot measures appeared on the ballot on November 8, 2016.

=== Measure 1 ===
The Alaska Voter Registration via the Permanent Fund Dividend Application Measure would allow voters to register to vote when submitting an annual permanent fund dividend application.

Results by state house district Yes: 50–60%; 60–70%; 70–80%

Ballot Measure 1
Choice	Votes	%
For	197,702	64.57
Against	108,467	35.43
Total	306,169	100.00
Source: Alaska Division of Elections

=== Measure 2 ===
The Alaska State Government Debt for Postsecondary Student Loans Amendment would allow the state debt to be contracted for postsecondary student loans.

Results by state house district Yes: 50–60%; No: 50–60%; 60–70%

Ballot Measure 2
Choice	Votes	%
For	130,867	44.19
Against	165,275	55.81
Total	296,142	100.00
Source: Alaska Division of Elections
