= Craig Stowers =

American judge (1954–2022)

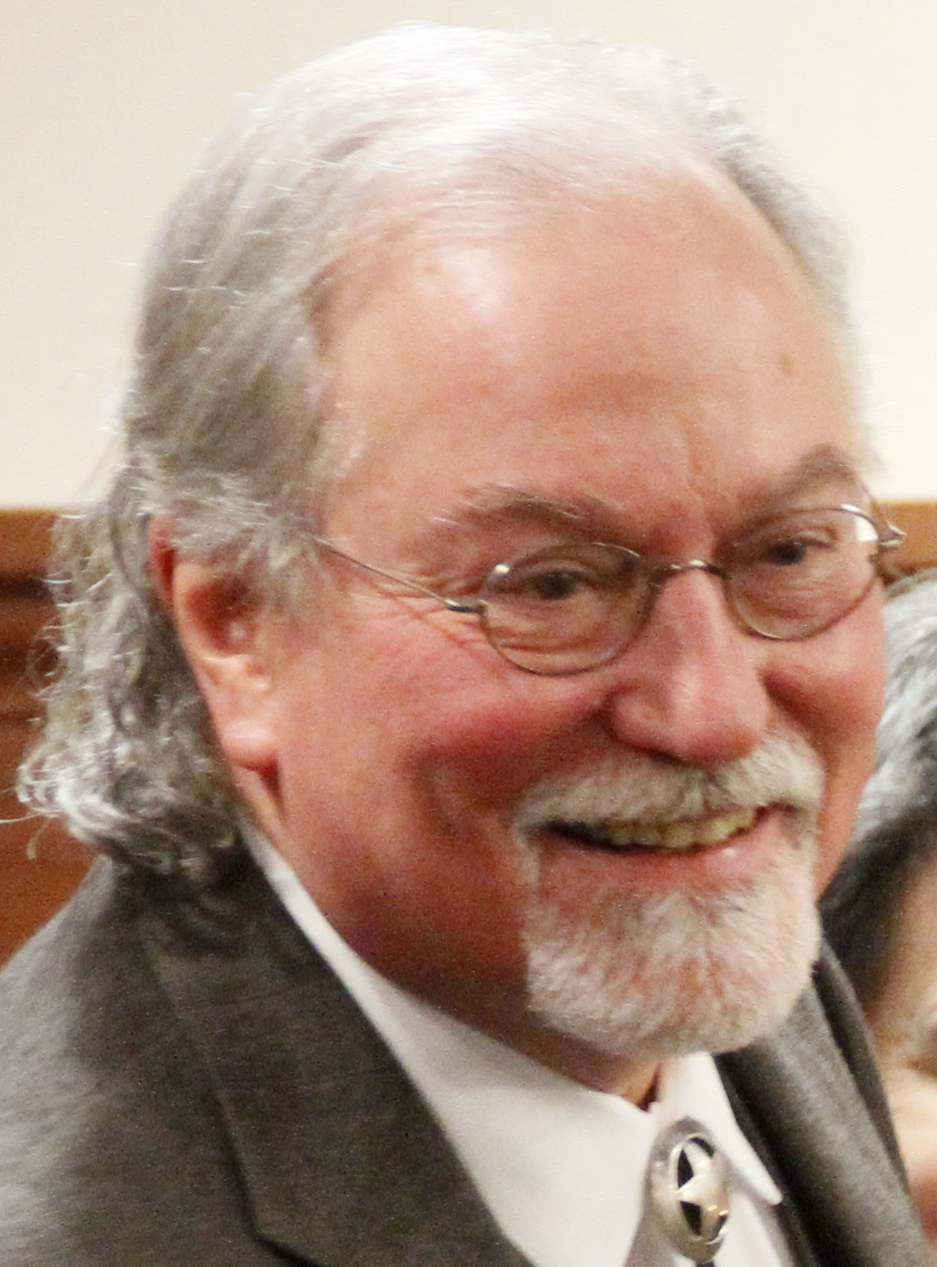
- Stowers, February 2020

Chief Justice of the Alaska Supreme Court
- In office July 1, 2015 – July 1, 2018
- Preceded by: Dana Fabe
- Succeeded by: Joel Bolger

Associate Justice of the Alaska Supreme Court
- In office December 3, 2009 – June 1, 2020
- Appointed by: Sean Parnell
- Preceded by: Robert Eastaugh
- Succeeded by: Dario Borghesan

Judge of the Alaska Superior Court
- In office 2004–2009
- Appointed by: Frank H. Murkowski
- Preceded by: John Reese
- Succeeded by: Andrew Guidi

Personal details
- Born: June 11, 1954 Daytona Beach, Florida
- Died: February 10, 2022 (aged 67)
- Education: Blackburn College, (BS); University of California, Davis, (JD)

Craig F. Stowers (June 11, 1954 – February 10, 2022) was an American lawyer and jurist who served as an associate justice, and the 18th chief justice, of the Alaska Supreme Court. He was appointed by Governor Sean Parnell in 2009 as an associate justice to replace retiring Justice Robert Eastaugh. Stowers was one of seven candidates recommended to the Governor by the Alaska Judicial Council out of a record 25 applicants.

Stowers was born in Daytona Beach, Florida on June 11, 1954, and grew up in Yorktown, Virginia. He earned his Bachelor of Science degree in biology from Blackburn College in Carlinville, Illinois in 1975. He then served as a park ranger with the National Park Service at Colonial National Historical Park in Virginia before transferring to Mount McKinley National Park in Alaska in 1977. After leaving the National Park Service he earned his Juris Doctor degree in 1985 from the University of California, Davis School of Law in Davis where he was inducted into the Order of the Coif honor society. Stowers then was a law clerk for U.S. Ninth Circuit Court of Appeals judge Robert Boochever and then served as a law clerk for Alaska Supreme Court Justice Warren Matthews.

In 1987, Stowers joined the law firm of Atkinson, Conway & Gagnon until leaving in 1995 to become a founding partner of the law firm of Clapp, Peterson and Stowers. In 2004, he left Clapp, Peterson and Stowers when he was appointed a Superior Court judge for the Third Judicial District in Anchorage by Governor Frank Murkowski.

Before his appointment to the Supreme Court by Governor Sean Parnell in 2009, Stowers was president of the board of directors of Christian Health Associates. He also was a board member of the Alaska Natural History Association, Brother Francis Shelter, and the Anchorage Neighborhood Health Center. Stowers retired from the Supreme Court on June 1, 2020, and died on February 10, 2022, at the age of 67.

Legal offices
Preceded by Robert Eastaugh	Associate Justice of the Alaska Supreme Court; 2009–2020	Succeeded by Dario Borghesan
Preceded by Dana Fabe	Chief Justice of the Alaska Supreme Court; 2015–2018	Succeeded by Joel Bolger
