= Boochever =

Boochever is a surname. Notable people with the surname include:

- Connie Boochever (1919–1999), American performer, director, producer of community theater, and patron and advocate for the arts
- Robert Boochever (1917–2011), American judge
