= 2026 Alaska judicial election =

2026 election in Alaska, United States

One justice of the five-member Alaska Supreme Court, 16 judges of the 45-member Alaska Superior Court, and four of the 20 judges on the Alaska District Court were up for retention by Alaska voters on November 3, 2026, concurrently with other state elections. Terms for Supreme Court are ten years, terms for Superior Court are six years, and terms for District Court are four years. These elections are nonpartisan.

== Judicial merit ==
The Alaska Judicial Council reviewed judges prior to their retention elections.

== Supreme Court ==
One member of the Alaska Supreme Court were up for retention.

Result of retention vote held November 3, 2026
Position	Incumbent	First appointed	Status	Vote
At-large	Jude Pate	2023 (Note: Appointed by Governor Mike Dunleavy)	Incumbent retained	✓ Yes 59.0%; No 41.0%

== Superior Court ==
16 members of the Alaska Superior Court were up for retention.

Results of retention vote held November 3, 2026
Position	Incumbent	First appointed	Status	Vote
1	Marianna C. Carpeneti	2021	Incumbent retained	✓ Yes 67.0%; No 33.0%
1	Daniel E. Doty	2022	Incumbent retained	✓ Yes 70.6%; No 29.4%
1	Katherine H. Lybrand	2022	Incumbent retained	✓ Yes 73.2%; No 26.8%
2	David L. Roghair	2021	Incumbent retained	✓ Yes 60.7%; No 39.3%
3	Laura Hartz	2023	Incumbent retained	✓ Yes 58.4%; No 41.6%
3	Yvonne Lamoureux	2017 (Note: Appointed by Governor Bill Walker)	Incumbent retained	✓ Yes 56.5%; No 43.5%
3	Kelly J. Lawson	2023	Incumbent not retained	✗ No 58.3%; Yes 41.7%
3	Jack R. McKenna	2021	Incumbent retained	✓ Yes 57.2%; No 42.8%
3	David A. Nesbett	2023	Incumbent retained	✓ Yes 59.8%; No 40.2%
3	Christina Rankin	2023	Incumbent retained	✓ Yes 59.8%; No 40.2%
3	Christina Reigh	2017	Incumbent retained	✓ Yes 57.7%; No 42.3%
3	Ian Wheeles	2022	Incumbent retained	✓ Yes 57.2%; No 42.8%
3	Jonathan A. Woodman	2016	Incumbent retained	✓ Yes 60.0%; No 40.0%
4	Nathaniel Peters	2017	Incumbent retained	✓ Yes 63.4%; No 36.6%
4	Kirk Schwalm	2022	Incumbent retained	✓ Yes 64.4%; No 35.6%
4	Amy Welch	2023	Incumbent retained	✓ Yes 62.8%; No 37.2%

== District Court ==
Four members of the Alaska District Court were up for retention.

Results of retention vote held November 3, 2026
Position	Incumbent	First elected	Status	Vote
3	Chris Darnall	2024	Incumbent retained	✓ Yes 60.1%; No 39.9%
3	Martin Fallon	2019	Incumbent not retained	✗ No 59.2%; Yes 40.8%
3	Shawn D. Traini	2019	Incumbent retained	✓ Yes 59.8%; No 40.2%
4	Benjamin A. Seekins	2012 (Note: Appointed by Governor Sean Parnell)	Incumbent retained	✓ Yes 66.8%; No 33.2%

== See also ==
- 2026 Alaska elections
- 2026 United States judicial elections
