= Eastaugh =

Eastaugh is a surname. Notable people with the surname include:

- Frederick Orlebar Eastaugh (1913–1992), son-in-law of R. E. Robertson, and partner in Robertson's law firm
- John Eastaugh (1920–1990), Anglican bishop
- Robert L. Eastaugh (born 1943), justice of the Alaska Supreme Court
- Simon Eastaugh (born 1973), Australian rules footballer
- Stephen Eastaugh (born 1960), Australian contemporary artist

== See also ==
- Eastaugh, or Lyng Eastaugh, a hamlet in Lyng, Norfolk
- Cyril Easthaugh (1897–1988), British Anglican bishop whose family had previously been named Eastaugh
