= John H. Dimond =

American judge (1918–1985)

- Dimond shown with the first Alaska Supreme Court (the other justices are cropped out of the photo), 1959

Senior Judge of the Alaska Supreme Court
- In office November 30, 1971 – June 1985

Justice of the Alaska Supreme Court
- In office August 7, 1959 – November 30, 1971
- Appointed by: Bill Egan
- Preceded by: Newly established court
- Succeeded by: Robert Boochever

Personal details
- Born: John Henry Dimond; December 28, 1918 Valdez, Alaska
- Died: June 12, 1985 (aged 66) Seattle, Washington
- Citizenship: United States
- Parents: Anthony Dimond (father); Dorothea M. Dimond (mother)

Military service
- Allegiance: United States
- Branch/service: United States Army
- Years of service: 1942–1945
- Rank: Captain
- Unit: United States Army
- Battles/wars: World War II

John Henry Dimond (December 28, 1918 – June 12, 1985) was an American jurist who served as a justice of the Alaska Supreme Court from August 7, 1959, to November 30, 1971. He was one of Alaska's inaugural justices on the court serving with Buell Nesbett and Walter Hodge on the court's first ever bench. Born in Valdez, Alaska, he was the only son of Anthony Dimond and was briefly in private practice with his father prior to his death. The state courthouse in his adopted hometown of Juneau, Alaska, located across the street from the Alaska State Capitol, is named in his honor.

== Early life ==
Dimond was born on December 28, 1918, in Valdez, the middle child of three born to Dorothea M. Dimond, and future Valdez mayor and Alaska Territory delegate Anthony Dimond. He had two sisters and grew up with Anthony Dimond's godson, Bill Egan, Alaska's first governor. In the early 1930s, Egan gave John Dimond and future Anchorage Mayor George M. Sullivan boxing training, once leading to an incident where Dimond punched Egan hard and he fell out of a window. Sullivan and Dimond waited for minutes for Egan to re-appear, although as time went on, Egan was nowhere to be seen. Egan suddenly burst through the door and said "Ok, boys, the lesson is over for today."

Dimond went on expeditions with Father Bernard Hubbard, nicknamed the "Glacier Priest". Dimond was seriously burned in a boating accident, while helping build the National Shrine of St. Thérèse in Juneau. He was burned by the fumes from a nearby leaking gasoline tank which exploded.

Dimond served in the U.S. Army during World War II, receiving the Silver Star, the Bronze Star, the Purple Heart, the Asiatic Pacific Medal with two bronze stars, and the Philippine Liberation service medal with a bronze star.

== Career ==
Dimond was appointed to the inaugural state supreme court by Governor Bill Egan, on August 7, 1959. His law clerks included future Alaska Chief Justice Walter L. Carpeneti. After his retirement from the court, on November 30, 1971, Dimond continued to sit from time to time as a senior justice until his death at 66, in Seattle.

Political offices
Preceded by Newly established court	Justice of the Alaska Supreme Court; 1959–1971	Succeeded by Robert Boochever
