= Morgan Christen =

American judge (born 1961)

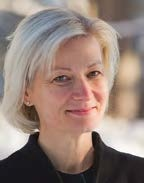

Judge of the United States Court of Appeals for the Ninth Circuit
- Incumbent
- Assumed office January 11, 2012
- Appointed by: Barack Obama
- Preceded by: Andrew Kleinfeld

Associate Justice of the Alaska Supreme Court
- In office April 5, 2009 – January 11, 2012
- Appointed by: Sarah Palin
- Preceded by: Warren Matthews
- Succeeded by: Peter J. Maassen

Personal details
- Born: Morgan Brenda Christen or Brenda June Christen; December 5, 1961 (age 63) Chehalis, Washington, U.S.
- Spouse: James Torgerson
- Children: 1
- Education: University of Washington (BA); Golden Gate University (JD)

Morgan Brenda Christen (born December 5, 1961) is an American lawyer and jurist who serves as a U.S. circuit judge of the U.S. Court of Appeals for the Ninth Circuit. She previously served as a state court judge on the Alaska Supreme Court from 2009 to 2012 and on the Alaska Superior Court from 2002 to 2009.

== Early life, education, and legal career ==
Christen was born in 1961 in Chehalis, Washington. She graduated from the University of Washington in 1983 with a Bachelor of Arts degree in international studies. She then attended the Golden Gate University School of Law, graduating with a Juris Doctor in 1986. She is married to James Torgerson and has one child.

After graduating from law school, Christen was a law clerk to Alaska Superior Court judge Brian Shortell from 1986 to 1987. From 1987 to 2002, she was in private practice at the law firm Preston Gates & Ellis, becoming a partner in 1993.

== Judicial career ==
=== Alaska state judicial service ===
Christen was a judge on the Alaska Superior Court from 2002 to 2009. In 2009, she was one of two candidates recommended by the seven-member Alaska Judicial Council to replace Justice Warren Matthews on the Alaska Supreme Court. Christen was opposed by anti-abortion advocacy groups due to her service as a Planned Parenthood board member in the mid-1990s. Nonetheless, on March 4, 2009, Governor Sarah Palin selected Christen to fill the vacancy on the Alaska Supreme Court.

=== Federal judicial service ===
On May 18, 2011, President Barack Obama nominated Christen to the seat on the Ninth Circuit vacated by Andrew Kleinfeld, who assumed senior status on June 12, 2010. On September 8, 2011, the Senate Judiciary Committee reported her nomination out of committee by a voice vote. The Senate confirmed Christen by a 95–3 vote on December 15, 2011. She received her commission on January 11, 2012 and maintains her chambers in Anchorage.

== See also ==
- List of first women lawyers and judges in Alaska

Legal offices
Preceded by Warren Matthews	Associate Justice of the Alaska Supreme Court; 2009–2012	Succeeded by Peter J. Maassen
Preceded by Andrew Kleinfeld	Judge of the United States Court of Appeals for the Ninth Circuit; 2012–present	Incumbent
