= Jennifer S. Henderson =

American judge (born 1976)

Jennifer Henderson

Associate Justice of the Alaska Supreme Court
- Incumbent
- Assumed office July 7, 2021
- Appointed by: Mike Dunleavy
- Preceded by: Joel Bolger

Personal details
- Born: Jennifer Erin Stuart; June 10, 1976 (age 49) La Mesa, California, U.S.
- Education: Claremont McKenna College (BA); Yale University (JD)

Jennifer Erin Henderson (née Stuart; born June 10, 1976) is an American lawyer from Alaska who has served as an associate justice of the Alaska Supreme Court since 2021. She was previously a judge of the Anchorage Superior Court from 2017 to 2021 and of the Alaska District Court from 2012 to 2017.

== Early life and education ==
Henderson was born Jennifer Erin Stuart in La Mesa, California. She studied politics, philosophy, and economics at Claremont McKenna College, graduating in 1998 with a Bachelor of Arts summa cum laude and Phi Beta Kappa membership. She then attended Yale Law School, graduating with a Juris Doctor in 2001. At Yale, Henderson was an editor of the Yale Journal of Law and Feminism.

== Legal career ==
After law school, she was a law clerk for Alaska Supreme Court justice Warren Matthews from 2001 to 2002, then for U.S. circuit judge Kim McLane Wardlaw of the U.S. Court of Appeals for the Ninth Circuit from 2002 to 2003.

From 2003 to 2007, she served as an Assistant District Attorney in the Anchorage District Attorney's Office. She served as an associate of the law offices of Farley & Graves in Anchorage from 2007 to 2012.

== Judicial career ==
=== Alaska state court service ===
Henderson was appointed to the district court by Alaska Governor Sean Parnell in 2012. She was then elevated to the superior court by Governor Bill Walker in 2017.

=== Alaska Supreme Court ===
In May 2021, the Alaska Judicial Council submitted three names, Dani Crosby, Yvonne Lamoureux, and Henderson to the governor. The vote was contentious after the governor raised questions why a nominee Superior Court Judge Paul Roetman had not been advanced; it was the second time the governor had to ask for new nominees from the council. On July 7, 2021, Governor Mike Dunleavy appointed Henderson as an associate justice of the Alaska Supreme Court.

Legal offices
Preceded by Joel Bolger	Associate Justice of the Alaska Supreme Court; 2021–present	Incumbent
