= Justice Burke =

Justice Burke may refer to:

- Adrian P. Burke (1904–2000), judge of the New York Court of Appeals
- Aedanus Burke (1743–1802), soldier, judge, and United States Representative from South Carolina
- Anne M. Burke (born 1944), Illinois Supreme Court Justice for the First Judicial District
- E. James Burke (born c. 1949), associate justice of the Wyoming Supreme Court
- Edmond W. Burke (1935–2020), associate justice of the Alaska Supreme Court
- Edward T. Burke (1870–1935), justice of the Supreme Court of North Dakota
- John Burke (North Dakota politician) (1859–1937), associate justice of the North Dakota Supreme Court
- Louis H. Burke (1905–1986), associate justice of the Supreme Court of California]
- Nicholas Charles Burke (1854–1923), associate justice of the Maryland Court of Appeals
- Thomas Burke (railroad builder) (1849–1925), American lawyer, railroad builder, and chief justice of the Supreme Court of the Washington Territory
- Thomas J. Burke (North Dakota judge) (1896–1966), associate justice of the North Dakota Supreme Court

== See also ==
- Judge Burke (disambiguation)
