= Walter L. Carpeneti =

American judge

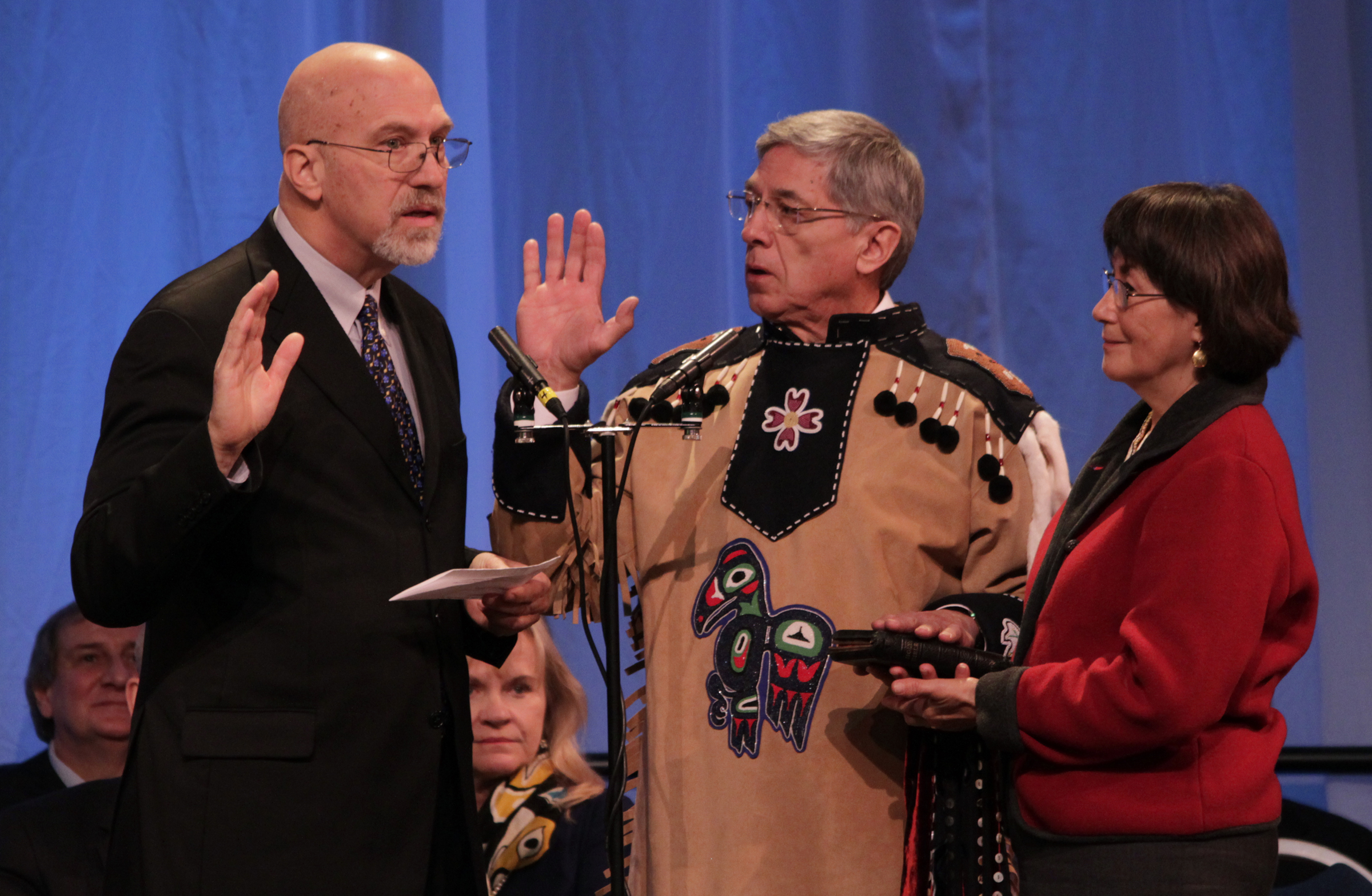
- Walter Carpeneti, at left, swearing in Byron Mallott as lieutenant governor of Alaska on December 1, 2014.

Chief Justice of the Alaska Supreme Court
- In office July 1, 2009 – June 30, 2012
- Preceded by: Dana Fabe
- Succeeded by: Dana Fabe

Associate Justice of the Alaska Supreme Court
- In office November 4, 1998 – January 2013
- Appointed by: Tony Knowles
- Preceded by: Allen T. Compton
- Succeeded by: Joel Bolger

Judge of the Alaska Superior Court for the First Division
- In office 1981–1998
- Appointed by: Jay Hammond
- Preceded by: Thomas B. Stewart
- Succeeded by: Patricia A. Collins

Personal details
- Born: January 25, 1945 (age 81) San Francisco, California, U.S.
- Education: Stanford University (BA); UC Berkeley (JD)

Walter Louis "Bud" Carpeneti (born January 25, 1945) is an American lawyer and former jurist, who served as the chief justice of the Alaska Supreme Court from 2009 to 2012. He attended Stanford University and UC Berkeley School of Law. He moved to Juneau, Alaska to clerk for two earlier Alaska Supreme Court justices.

== Early life and education ==
Carpeneti was born in San Francisco and grew up there. He is the son of San Francisco Superior Court Judge Walter I. Carpeneti. After receiving a Bachelor of Arts degree in history from Stanford University in Stanford, California in 1967 and a Juris Doctor degree from the UC Berkeley School of Law in Berkeley in 1970. Walter L. Carpineti was a law clerk for Alaska Supreme Court Justices John H. Dimond and Jay Rabinowitz.

== Early career ==
Returning to San Francisco in 1972 after being a clerk, Carpeneti initially entered private practice with Melvin Belli before joining in private practice with his father, retired Judge Walter I. Carpeneti, and his brother, Richard Carpeneti.

Leaving the family law practice, Walter L. Carpeneti returned to Alaska in 1974 to join the Alaska Public Defender Agency as supervising attorney of its Juneau office. He left the Public Defender Agency in 1978 to enter private practice with William T. Council. During that time, he was a member of the Alaska Judicial Council and of the committee which drafted the Alaska rules of evidence. He was the reporter to the Supreme Court's Criminal Pattern Jury Instructions Committee.

== Judge ==
On October 15, 1981, Governor Jay Hammond appointed Carpeneti to the Alaska Superior Court. While on the court, he was a member of the Alaska Commission on Judicial Conduct and of the Three-Judge Sentencing Panel. Additionally, he was chair of the Supreme Court's Criminal Sentencing Practices and Procedures Committee.

In 1998, Governor Tony Knowles, a Democrat, appointed Carpeneti to the Alaska Supreme Court. Carpeneti chaired the Supreme Court's Judicial Education Committee. He served as the 16th chief justice of the Alaska Supreme Court from 2009 to 2012. While chief justice, he served as second vice president on the board of directors of the national Conference of Chief Justices.

== Family life ==
In 1969, Carpeneti and Anne Dose married. They have four children: Chris, Marianna, Lia, and Bianca. Marianna Carpeneti was an attorney in Homer, Alaska before being appointed an Alaska Superior Court judge.

Legal offices
Preceded by Allen T. Compton	Associate Justice of the Alaska Supreme Court; 1998–2013	Succeeded by Joel Bolger
Preceded by Dana Fabe	Chief Justice of the Alaska Supreme Court; 2009–2012	Succeeded by Dana Fabe
