= Robert L. Eastaugh =

American judge (born 1943)

Robert Ladd Eastaugh (born November 12, 1943) is an American lawyer and jurist who served on the Alaska Supreme Court from 1994 to 2009. He is the grandson of R. E. Robertson and was formerly in private practice associated with the law firm founded by his grandfather.

Born in Seattle, Eastaugh received a BA degree in English literature from Yale University in New Haven, Connecticut, and a J.D. degree from the University of Michigan Law School in Ann Arbor. In 1993, when potential nominees were being vetted for the Supreme Court, Eastaugh was one of the two most popular candidates among the Alaskan lawyers surveyed by the state bar association. He retired from the court in 2009.

In 2020, Eastaugh was recalled to the court to fill in for recused Chief Justice Joel Bolger, in a case about the legality of an application to recall the governor.

Political offices
Preceded by Edmond W. Burke	Justice of the Alaska Supreme Court; 1994–2009	Succeeded by Craig Stowers
