= Bryner =

Bryner may refer to:

== Surname ==
- Alex Bryner, (born 1943) American jurist
- Lilian Bryner, Swiss female racing driver
- Hans Bryner, Swiss former Olympic sailor

== Given name ==
- Cadwaladr Bryner Jones, leading figure in Welsh agricultural education

== See also ==
- Yul Brynner
