= Whaley Children's Center =

US private organization

Coordinates: 43.02388°N 83.7054°W

The Whaley Children's Center is a private agency that focuses on caring for children and families in crisis. It is located in Flint, Michigan, neighboring Hurley Medical Center. Whaley Children's Center offers a wide variety of services to meet the basic needs of children and families in need.

== History ==
The Whaley Children's Center was conceived as an idea in the late 1880s by a man named Robert J. Whaley. Robert was inspired to open a children's center by the death of his son(Donald M. Whaley) at the age of eleven. His son was saving his earnings to voluntarily give to a children's orphanage in Detroit. While being inspired by his son's willingness to care for trouble children, Robert began to invest money into his will to build the Donald M. Whaley Home in memory of his son.

The Whaley Children's Center was built in 1926, with the leadership of Charles Stewart Mott, who was the first president of the Whaley Foundation. Since the building of the Whaley Children's Center, there has been many additions. In 1955, a recreational building was added, which included; a gym, craft room, and two classrooms. In 1964, the Children's Center went under major renovations for the first time since 1926 to improve the overall appearance. In 1977, Whaley's Children Center was the first agency to provide a foster care treatment program, that would provide children to live with specially trained families. During the same year, an educational center was also added to the recreational center. It included five classrooms, several offices and meeting rooms. In 1982, a special needs adoption program was also a new addition.

== Treatment programs ==
=== Optimist House ===
Established in 1994, the Optimist House is a program that focuses on six youth, ranging in ages 6–17 in a residential environment. With the support of many other agencies The Whaley's Children Center is able to provide these children with clothing, food, shelter and education. The youth that live in the Optimist House are able to get involved in community activities, and additional educational activities.

=== Rotary House ===
The Rotary House was established in 1985. This group home has a great amount of relation to the Optimist House. Six children have their own individual room in which they have chores and help prepare meals. The children also have the opportunity to be appointed a "job" for some extra cash.

=== Zonta House ===
The Zonta House was established in 1994. It helps six females ranging from ages 8–17 in a residential group home environment. With donations given by the community the girls are provided with meals, clothing, shelter and education. The youth that live in the Zonta House are actively involved in community extra-curricular activities.
