= Justice Compton =

Justice Compton may refer to:

- Allen T. Compton (1938–2008), associate justice of the Alaska Supreme Court
- Christian Compton (1929–2006), associate justice of the Supreme Court of Virginia
- Freeman W. Compton (1824–1893), associate justice of the Arkansas Supreme Court
- James C. Compton (18861–1981), associate justice of the New Mexico Supreme Court
