= Daniel A. Moore Jr. =

American judge (died 2022)

Associate Justice of the Alaska Supreme Court
- In office December 10, 1983 – December 1995
- Appointed by: Bill Sheffield
- Preceded by: Roger G. Connor
- Succeeded by: Dana Fabe

Personal details
- Died: on or before September 27, 2022 Wilsonville, Oregon, U.S.
- Education: University of Notre Dame, the University of Denver Law School

Daniel Alton Moore Jr. (died on about September 27, 2022) was a former justice of the Supreme Court of Alaska. He served from July 10, 1983, to December 31, 1995.

After attending Cathedral High in Duluth, Minnesota, graduating from the University of Notre Dame in 1955, serving for two years in the U.S. Marine Corps, and graduating from the University of Denver Law School, Moore settled in Anchorage, Alaska, where he practiced law as a defense attorney for 20 years. His in-laws, the Crawford family, are an Anchorage business family spanning multiple generations.

After serving for two years as a Superior Court judge, in 1983 Moore was appointed to the Alaska Supreme Court by Governor Bill Sheffield. On September 3, 1992, Moore was elected by his fellow justices to serve as chief justice for a three-year term. Moore's term ended in September 1995; the justices then chose Allen T. Compton to succeed Moore as chief justice.

Moore died in September 2022, of COVID-19 complications, in Oregon, where he had moved in retirement.

Political offices
Preceded by Roger G. Connor	14th Justice of the Alaska Supreme Court; 1983–1995	Succeeded by Dana Fabe
Preceded by Jay Rabinowitz	10th Chief Justice of the Alaska Supreme Court; 1992–1995	Succeeded by Allen T. Compton
