= Harry Arend =

American judge (1903–1966)

Justice of the Alaska Supreme Court
- In office May 1960 – January 1965
- Preceded by: Walter Hartman Hodge
- Succeeded by: Jay Rabinowitz

United States Attorney for the Fourth Division of Alaska Territory
- In office 1944–1949
- Preceded by: Ralph Rivers
- Succeeded by: Everett W. Hepp

Personal details
- Born: Harry Oscar Arend; October 26, 1903 Spokane, Washington, U.S.
- Died: June 28, 1966 (aged 62)
- Education: University of Washington (LLB, LLM)
- Profession: Jurist

Harry Oscar Arend (October 26, 1903 – June 28, 1966) was an American jurist who served as a justice of the Alaska Supreme Court from May 1960 to January 1965. He is the only member of this court to have lost an election for retention to office. A street is named in his honor in the outskirts of Ester, Alaska.

Born in Spokane, Washington, Arend received his Bachelor of Laws and Master of Laws degrees from the University of Washington.

Arend moved to Alaska in 1933, and was a schoolteacher for a year until his admission to the bar. He served as United States attorney for the District of Alaska, and in 1959 was appointed presiding judge for the Fourth Judicial District, and then associate justice of the Alaska Supreme Court. In 1964, he was defeated in a retention election following "a complicated dispute between the Supreme Court and the Alaska Bar Association".

After leaving the court, Arend served as a regional solicitor for the United States Department of the Interior.

Arend was a member of the Church of Jesus Christ of Latter-day Saints. In the mid-1950s Arend served as president of the Fairbanks branch of the church.

Legal offices
Preceded by Ralph Julian Rivers	United States Attorney for the Fourth Division of Alaska Territory; 1944–1949	Succeeded by Everett W. Hepp
Preceded by Walter Hartman Hodge	Justice of the Alaska Supreme Court; 1960–1965	Succeeded by Jay Andrew Rabinowitz
