= Judge Burke =

Judge Burgess may refer to:

- Harold P. Burke (1895–1981), judge of the United States District Court for the Western District of New York
- Liles C. Burke (born 1969), judge of the United States District Court for the Northern District of Alabama
- Lloyd Hudson Burke (1916–1988), judge of the United States District Court for the Northern District of California

== See also ==
- Justice Burke (disambiguation)
