= Roger G. Connor =

American judge (1926–1999)

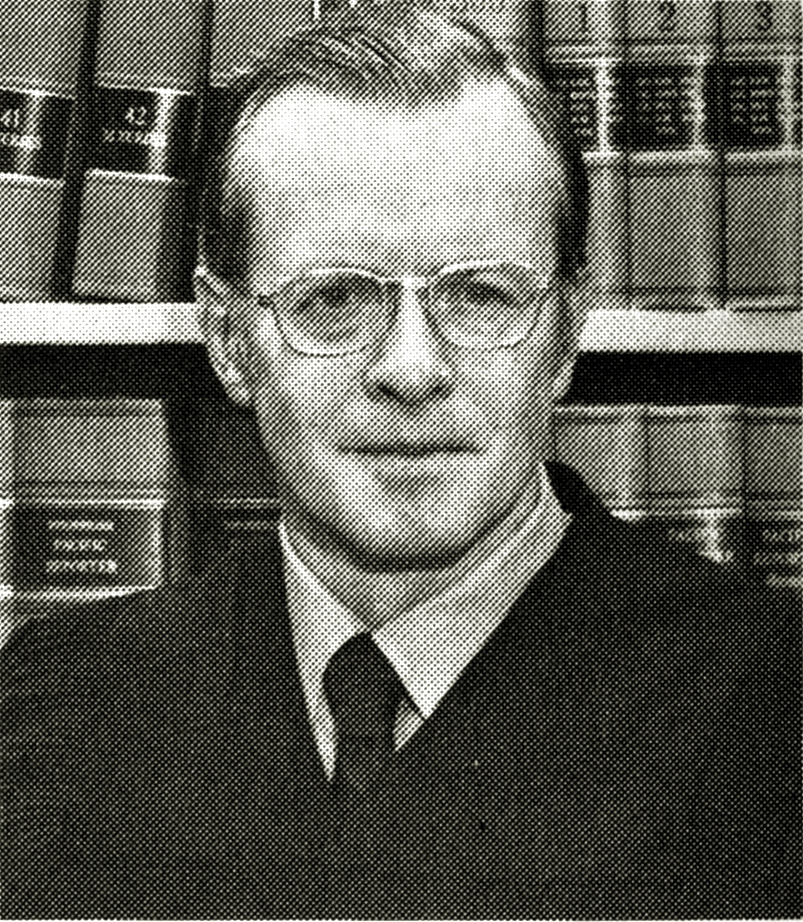
Roger G. Connor

Roger George Connor (April 23, 1926 – July 4, 1999) was a justice of the Alaska Supreme Court from December 2, 1968, to May 1, 1983.

Connor served in the United States Navy during World War II. He was one of sixteen applicants announced as having passed the Alaska state bar examination on March 1, 1955. In April 1956, he was named acting United States district attorney of Alaska's first division. The following month, President Dwight D. Eisenhower formally named Connor to be the United States attorney for that division. On April 23, 1959, Eisenhower accepted Connor's resignation from the post.

In 1968, the Alaska Supreme Court was expanded from three justices to five, and the two new seats were filled by the appointments of Connor and George F. Boney. In November 1982, Connor was injured in a car accident in which he was struck by a drunk driver, which ultimately led to his resignation from the court in May 1983.

Political offices
Preceded by Newly created seat.	Justice of the Alaska Supreme Court; 1968–1983	Succeeded by Daniel Alton Moore Jr.
