= Susan M. Carney =

American judge (born 1961)

Susan Carney
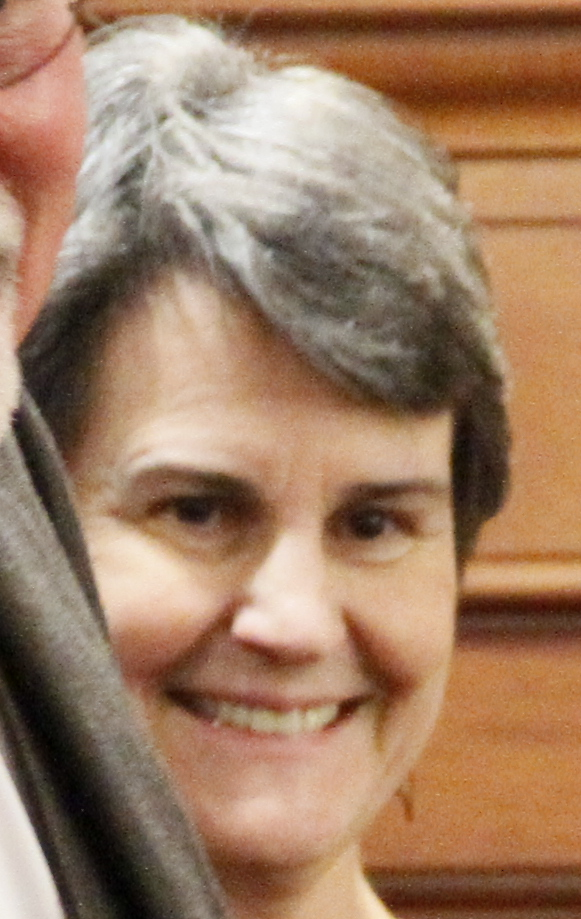

Chief Justice of the Alaska Supreme Court
- Incumbent
- Assumed office January 10, 2025
- Preceded by: Peter J. Maassen

Justice of the Alaska Supreme Court
- Incumbent
- Assumed office August 26, 2016
- Appointed by: Bill Walker
- Preceded by: Dana Fabe

Personal details
- Born: 1961 (age 64–65) Worcester, Massachusetts, U.S.
- Education: Harvard University (BA, JD)

Susan M. Carney (born June 17, 1961) is an American attorney and jurist. She has served as the chief justice of the Supreme Court of Alaska since 2025, while concurrently serving as an associate justice of the court. She was appointed on May 12, 2016, she was sworn in on August 26, 2016. In November 2024, she was named chief justice after the mandatory retirement of then-Chief Justice Peter J. Maassen.

== Biography ==
Carney was born in Worcester, Massachusetts. She earned a bachelor's degree in history and literature at Radcliffe College of Harvard University and graduated cum laude from Harvard Law School.

After law school, she clerked for Justice Jay Rabinowitz. Carney later worked as a defense attorney in the Office of Public Advocacy and with the Alaska Public Defender Agency.

Legal offices
Preceded by Dana Fabe	Justice of the Alaska Supreme Court; 2016–present	Incumbent
Preceded by Peter J. Maassen	Chief Justice of the Alaska Supreme Court; 2025–present	Incumbent
