= Jay Rabinowitz (jurist) =

American judge

Jay Andrew Rabinowitz
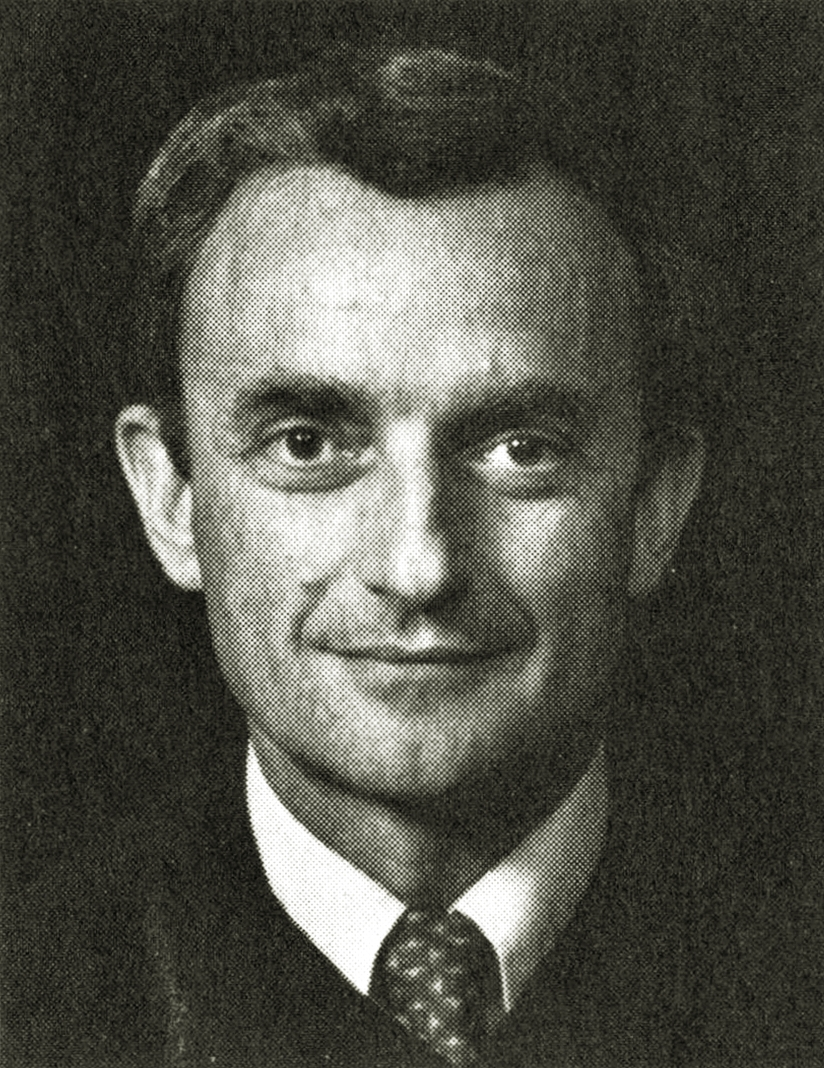
- Jay Rabinowitz during his first term as chief justice.

Chief Justice of Alaska Supreme Court
- In office 1972–1992
- Preceded by: George Boney
- Succeeded by: Allen T. Compton

Associate Justice of the Alaska Supreme Court
- In office March 4, 1965 – February 28, 1997
- Appointed by: Bill Egan
- Preceded by: Harry O. Arend
- Succeeded by: Alexander O. Bryner

Personal details
- Born: February 25, 1927 Philadelphia, Pennsylvania, U.S.
- Died: June 16, 2001 (aged 74) Seattle, Washington, U.S.
- Spouse: Anne

Jay Andrew Rabinowitz (February 25, 1927 – June 16, 2001) was an American lawyer, jurist, and chief justice of the Alaska Supreme Court for four non-consecutive terms, remaining active as a justice from February 1965 until his mandatory retirement in February 1997.

During his time on the Alaska Supreme Court, Rabinowitz wrote more than 1,200 court opinions, 200 of them dissenting. Rabinowitz wrote landmark opinions in cases involving privacy, reproductive freedom, search and seizure, self-incrimination, free speech, and marijuana use.

Before attending Syracuse University, Rabinowitz served in the U.S. Army Air Forces near the end of World War II. In 1952, he received his law degree from Harvard Law School.

== Early life and career ==
Rabinowitz was born in Philadelphia, Pennsylvania, to a Jewish-American family. His paternal grandfather had emigrated from Riga, Latvia to Woodbine, New Jersey, at age fourteen, leaving his own family behind. Jay Rabinowitz grew up in Brooklyn, New York where his father, Milton, a 1922 graduate of the Wharton School of the University of Pennsylvania, worked as a bookkeeper for a wholesale fish distributor during the Great Depression.

Near the end of World War II, Rabinowitz served in the U.S. Army Air Forces. During his service overseas, Rabinowitz happened to meet his great-uncle Chaim, whom he'd never before met, in a displaced persons camp in Germany. Chaim was the family's only relative in Europe who had survived the Holocaust.

After returning home, Rabinowitz attended Syracuse University, where he earned a bachelor of arts degree in 1949.

He graduated from Harvard Law School in 1952 and was admitted to the bar in New York State the same year. After practicing law in New York City for five years, Rabinowitz moved to Fairbanks, Alaska, in 1957, to accept a position as law clerk to U.S. Territorial Court judge Vernon Forbes.

In 1958, Rabinowitz was admitted to the Alaska Bar Association and clerked for the United States District Court in Fairbanks. He was appointed superior court judge in Fairbanks in 1960.

== Alaska Supreme Court ==
Following his appointment by Governor Bill Egan, Rabinowitz was sworn in as an Alaska Supreme Court justice on March 4, 1965. Rabinowitz remained on the state Supreme Court until February 28, 1997, having reached the mandated retirement age of 70 for judges in Alaska, during which time he served four non-consecutive three-year terms as chief justice. (The Alaska Constitution prohibits consecutive terms as chief supreme court justice.)

During his time on the bench, Rabinowitz wrote more than 1,200 court opinions, 200 of them dissenting. He was a strong and articulate voice for safeguarding the civil liberties of Alaskans. He wrote landmark opinions in cases involving privacy, reproductive freedom, search and seizure, self-incrimination, free speech, and marijuana use. He was particularly sensitive to the ways in which the law affected the legal rights of Alaska Natives and authored several noteworthy judicial opinions that respected Native traditions in areas of family rights and adoption, education, and law enforcement.

Rabinowitz's law clerks included Robert Coates and Andrew Kleinfeld, who became a judge of the Ninth Circuit.

Beginning in 1971, Rabinowitz also served on the National Conference of Commissioners on Uniform State Laws, where he headed three drafting committees and served on numerous others.

== Personal life ==
Rabinowitz was a competitive athlete, and pursued both tennis and skiing throughout his life, taking up long-distance running in middle age. He and his wife, Anne, had four children, including former Olympian Judy Rabinowitz. His brother is Robert Rabinowitz, creator of Beatlemania, a 1974 Broadway musical show; his cousins include media contributor Seth Rabinowitz and Barrie Cassileth.

== Death and legacy ==
Rabinowitz died on June 16, 2001, at the age of 74 from complications of leukemia in a Seattle hospital. In remembrance of him, Governor Tony Knowles ordered Alaska state flags to be lowered to half-staff for five days. Said Knowles,

"Jay Rabinowitz devoted his life to the law.... He began his career when Alaska was a young state. His steady, thoughtful manner resulted in a body of law that will have a lasting impact on Alaska as we know it. I personally sought his guidance and input on a number of critical issues facing our state. I will miss his sense of humor and his integrity. Jay's legacy will not be forgotten."

The Rabinowitz Courthouse in downtown Fairbanks, Alaska, and the Alaska Bar Association's Jay Rabinowitz Public Serive Award are named after him.

== See also ==
- List of Jewish American jurists

Legal offices
Preceded by Harry Arend	Associate Justice of the Alaska Supreme Court; 4 March 1965-29 February 1997	Succeeded by Alex Bryner
Preceded by George F. Boney	3rd Chief Justice of the Alaska Supreme Court; 25 September 1972-1975	Succeeded by Robert Boochever
Preceded by Robert Boochever	5th Chief Justice of the Alaska Supreme Court; October 1978-1981	Succeeded by Edmond W. Burke
Preceded by Edmond W. Burke	7th Chief Justice of the Alaska Supreme Court; 1984-1 October 1987	Succeeded by Warren Matthews
Preceded by Warren Matthews	9th Chief Justice of the Alaska Supreme Court; 1990-1992	Succeeded by Daniel A. Moore Jr.
