= Alex Bryner =

American judge

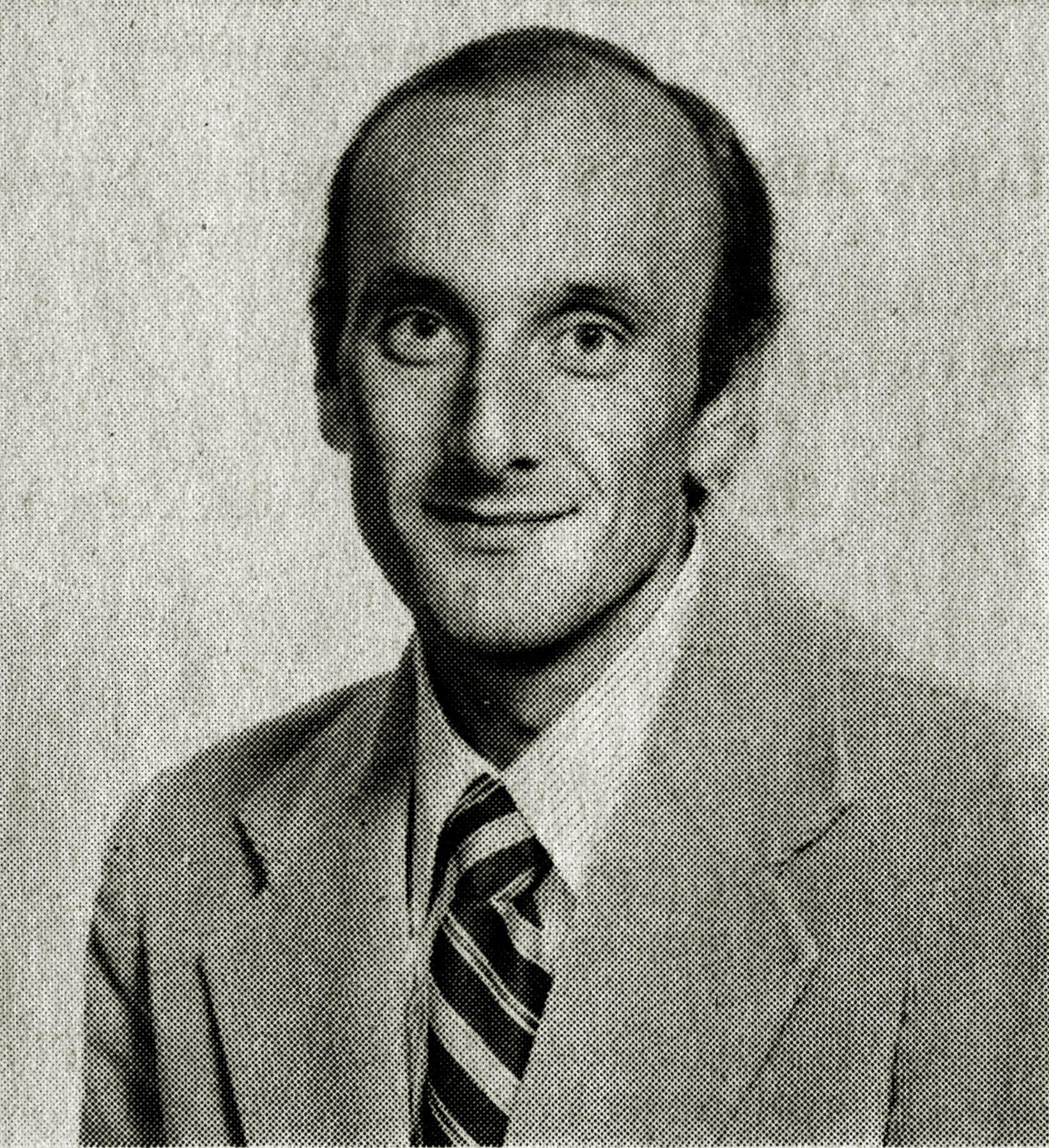
Alex Bryner in 1976

Alexander Ostroumov Bryner (born July 26, 1943) is a Chinese-born Russian American retired lawyer and jurist. Bryner was a justice of the Supreme Court of Alaska from February 1997 to October 2007.

Born in Tianjin, China, in 1943 to Russian immigrant parents, Bryner was raised in Menlo Park, California. He received his J.D. from Stanford University in 1969, thereafter moving to Alaska and serving as a law clerk for Alaska Supreme Court Chief Justice George Boney. He returned to Alaska to settle permanently in Anchorage in 1972. Bryner served as the U.S. attorney for Alaska from 1977 to 1980, when he was appointed to the newly created Alaska Court of Appeals. He served as that court's chief judge until he was appointed to the Supreme Court, replacing that court's longest-serving justice, Jay Rabinowitz. Bryner retired in 2007.

Bryner married Carol Crump, an artist, with whom he had a son and a daughter.

Legal offices
Preceded by James L. Swartz	United States Attorney for the District of Alaska; 1977 – 1980	Succeeded by Rene J. Gonzalez
Preceded by Jay Rabinowitz	Associate Justice of the Alaska Supreme Court; 1997 – 2007	Succeeded by Daniel Winfree
Preceded by Dana Fabe	Chief Justice of the Alaska Supreme Court; 2003 – 2006	Succeeded by Dana Fabe
