= Warren Matthews =

American judge

Justice of the Alaska Supreme Court
- In office May 26, 1977 – April 5, 2009
- Appointed by: Jay Hammond
- Preceded by: Robert Erwin
- Succeeded by: Morgan Christen

Personal details
- Born: April 5, 1939 (age 87) Santa Cruz, California, U.S.
- Education: Stanford University (BA); Harvard University (JD)

Warren Wayne Matthews Jr. (born April 5, 1939) is an American lawyer and jurist who was a justice of the Alaska Supreme Court from 1977 to 2009. He served as the 8th and 12th chief justice of the Alaska Supreme Court. He is the second-longest serving justice in Alaskan history (from May 1977 to April 2009), slightly less than that of Jay Rabinowitz.

Born in Santa Cruz, California, Matthews graduated from San Benito High School in Hollister, California in 1957. He says that he was inspired to become an attorney when a lawyer paid a visit to his classroom. He earned a Bachelor of Arts degree from Stanford University in Stanford, California in 1961 and a Juris Doctor degree from Harvard Law School in Cambridge, Massachusetts in 1964.

Matthews moved to Alaska in 1965 to serve as an associate at the law firm of Burr, Boney & Pease in Anchorage. In 1969, he formed the law firm of Matthews, Dunn and Bailey. He served as ethics committee chair for the Alaska Bar Association from 1968 to 1974. In 1977, Republican Governor Jay Hammond appointed Matthews as an associate justice of the Alaska Supreme Court. The other Supreme Court justices elected Matthews to be the 8th chief justice (from 1987 to 1990) and as the 12th chief justice (from 1997 to 2000). As chief justice, he also served concurrently as chairman of the Alaska Judicial Council. The nation's other chief justices elected Matthews as second vice president of the Conference of Chief Justices.

== Noted opinions ==
Matthews wrote the 4–1 majority opinion in the 1981 Supreme Court case of Nix v. Alaska, saying that an undercover police officer gaining access to a residence was not a violation of the Fourth Amendment prohibition against unreasonable searches and seizures. He said that "the use of undercover police agents 'is a highly necessary tool in fighting crime.'"

In 2007, Matthews dissented in the 3–2 Supreme Court decision of Alaska v. Planned Parenthood in which the Court struck down Alaska's law requiring parental consent for minors to obtain abortions. He supported the law, arguing: "Without a parent's consent, [minors] may not become licensed drivers or get married or obtain general medical or dental treatment." Later in 2007, he wrote the dissenting opinion in the 3–2 Supreme Court decision Godfrey, d/b/a Mendenhall Valley Tesoro v. State of Alaska, Community and Economic Development, in which the court supported Alaska's law holding retailers legally liable if their employees sold tobacco to minors, even unknowingly. Matthews opposed the law, saying that the law was too broad in not allowing a retailer to argue that a clerk was not negligent.

== Legacy ==
Several of his former law clerks became prominent statewide in Alaskan politics: Supreme Court Justice Craig F. Stowers, Attorney General Daniel S. Sullivan (Sullivan later became a U.S. senator from Alaska), and state representative Lindsey Holmes.

Since retiring from the Supreme Court in 2009, Matthews has served as a pro tem judge.

== Personal life ==
Warren Matthews and Donna, his wife married in 1963. They have two daughters: Holly (born ca. 1974), a psychiatric social worker; and Meredith (born ca. 1978), an attorney in private practice.

Legal offices
Preceded by Robert Cecil Erwin	Associate Justice of the Alaska Supreme Court; May 26, 1977 – April 5, 2009	Succeeded by Morgan Christen
Preceded by Jay Rabinowitz	8th Chief Justice of the Alaska Supreme Court; October 1, 1987 – September 30, 1990	Succeeded by Jay Rabinowitz
Preceded by Allen T. Compton	12th Chief Justice of the Alaska Supreme Court; July 1, 1997 – June 30, 2000	Succeeded by Dana Fabe
