= Rabinowitz Courthouse =

Coordinates: 64.844714°N 147.717823°W

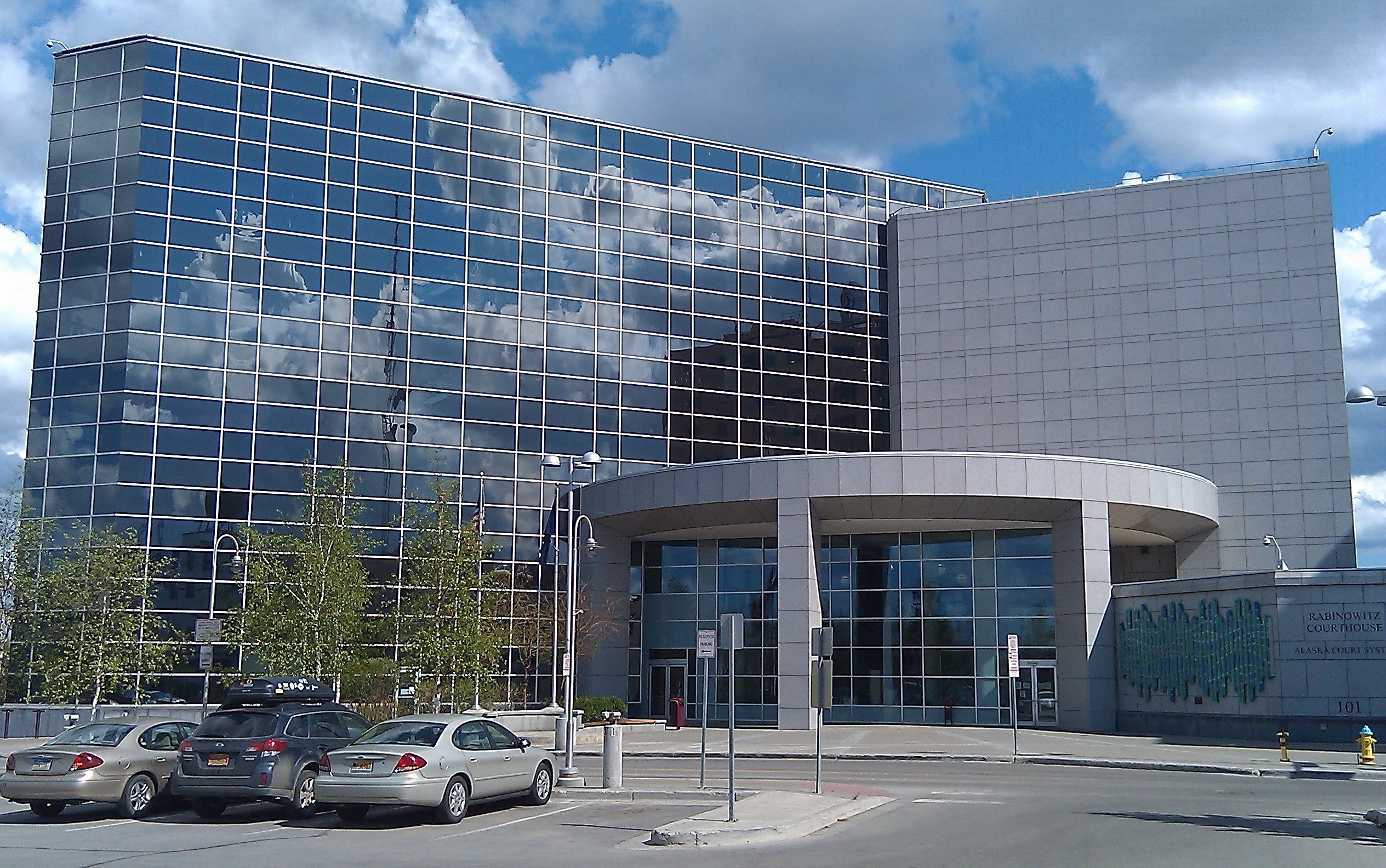
Rabinowitz Courthouse

Rabinowitz Courthouse is an Alaska Court of Appeals state courthouse in Fairbanks, Alaska named after former Chief Justice Jay Rabinowitz, situated at 101 Lacey Street, adjacent to the Chena River.

The 2001 building was designed by the firm, Charles Bettisworth & Company in collaboration with McCool Green Architects. The edifice incorporates Alaska art in a multitude of media formats.
