= Hurley Medical Center =

- Location of Flint, Michigan

Geography
- Location: Flint, Michigan, United States
- Coordinates: 43.02202°N 83.7046°W

Organization
- Funding: Non-profit hospital
- Type: Teaching
- Affiliated university: Michigan State University, University of Michigan

Services
- Emergency department: Level I Trauma Center, Level II Pediatric Trauma Center
- Beds: 457

History
- Opened: 1908 by James J Hurley (Born London 1850)

Links
- Website: www.hurleymc.com
- Lists: Hospitals in Michigan

Hurley Medical Center is a teaching hospital serving Genesee, Lapeer, and Shiawassee counties in eastern Michigan since December 19, 1908. Situated in Flint, Michigan, it is a 457-bed public non-profit hospital.

The emergency department is an ACS verified Level I Trauma Center and Level II Pediatric Trauma Center. Hurley also has the region's only Children's Hospital, Burn Unit, Neonatal Intensive Care Unit, Pediatric Intensive Care Unit, and Pediatric Emergency Department.

== History ==
James J. Hurley, an English immigrant, arrived in Flint penniless and worked his way up from a hotel porter to making a fortune from sawmills and soap. Remembering his early days of poverty when his wife struggled through a serious illness, Hurley donated $55,000 and land for a public hospital to the city of Flint. Hurley Hospital opened on December 19, 1908, as a 40-bed hospital with 8 nurses. Josiah Dallas Dort was also involved in its early business.

Many victims of the Flint water crisis were treated at Hurley. A study performed there determined that children were being poisoned by lead. Proceeds from Tegan Marie's single "Lucky Me" were used to benefit the patients.

== Notable people ==
=== Patients ===
- Kayla Rolland (1993–2000), A 6-year-old girl who was shot and killed by a classmate and was (at that point) the youngest school shooting victim. She died under cardiac arrest at Hurley.
- Woodrow Stanley (1950–2022), A democratic politician who died at Hurley.

=== Staff ===
- Connie Boochever (1919–1999), A stage actress and director who was a registered nurse at Hurley.
- Karen Weaver (born c.1959), A psychologist and former mayor of Flint who served on a number of committees in the city, including the Hurley's Board of Managers, Priority Children and the Community Foundation of Greater Flint.

== Affiliations ==
It is affiliated with the medical schools of Michigan State University and University of Michigan. It is also affiliated with nursing schools of the University of Michigan–Flint and Mott Community College.
