= Daniel Winfree =

American judge

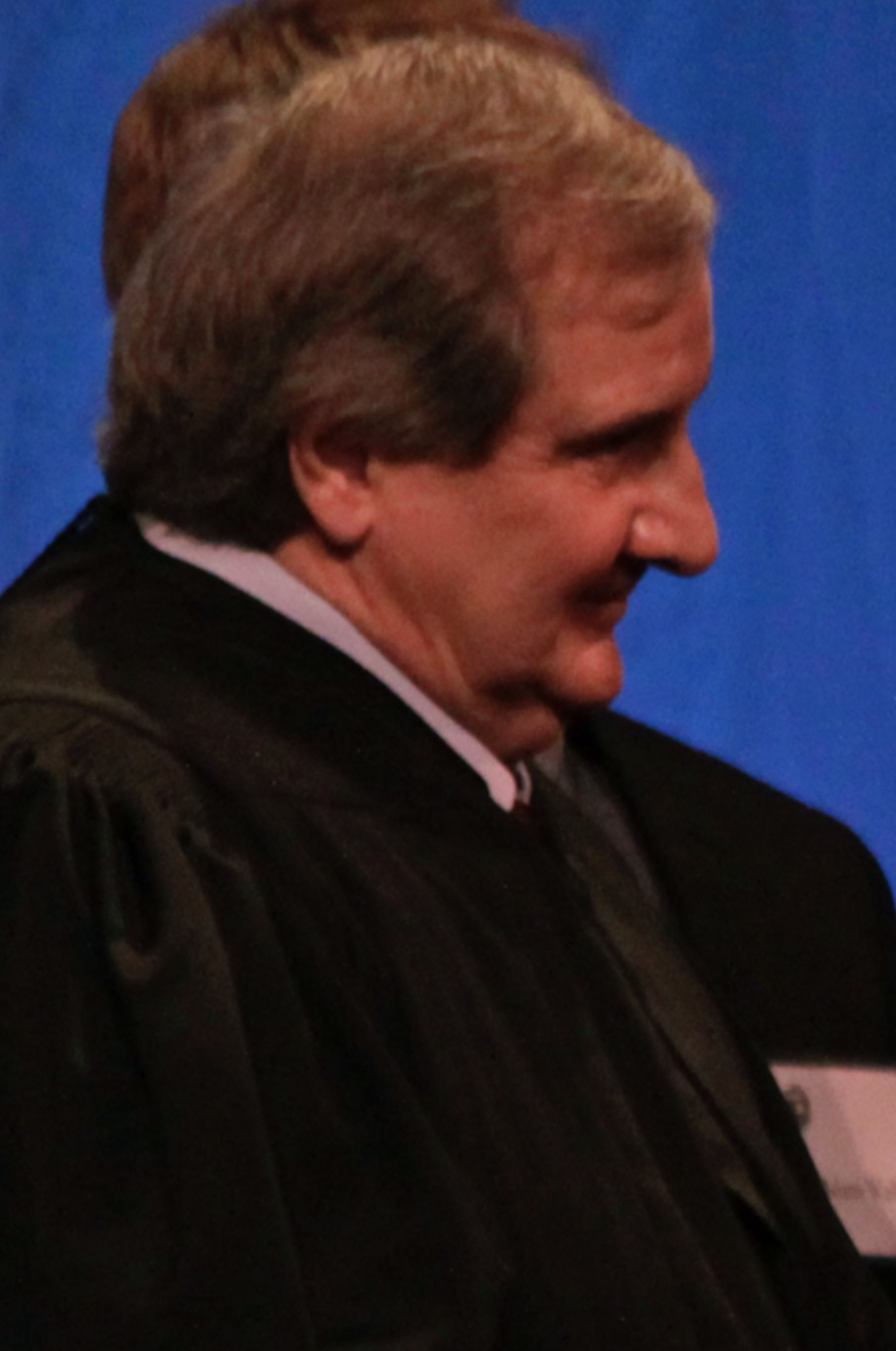

Chief Justice of the Alaska Supreme Court
- In office July 1, 2021 – February 6, 2023
- Preceded by: Joel Bolger
- Succeeded by: Peter J. Maassen

Justice of the Alaska Supreme Court
- In office February 13, 2008 – February 6, 2023
- Appointed by: Sarah Palin
- Preceded by: Alex Bryner
- Succeeded by: Jude Pate

Personal details
- Born: Daniel Edward Winfree; February 1953 (age 73) Fairbanks, Alaska, U.S.
- Education: University of Oregon (BS); University of California, Berkeley (MBA, JD)

Daniel Edward Winfree (born February 1953) is an American lawyer who served as chief justice of the Alaska Supreme Court from 2021 to 2023. He was appointed to the Alaska Supreme Court by Governor Sarah Palin in 2008. He was sworn in on February 13, 2008 and he retired in February 2023.

== Education ==
Winfree received a Bachelor of Science degree in finance from the University of Oregon in Eugene in 1977, a Master of Business Administration degree from the Haas School of Business at UC Berkeley in Berkeley, California and a Juris Doctor degree from UC Berkeley School of Law, earning both degrees in 1981.

== Alaska Supreme Court ==
He was appointed to the court in 2008 by Republican Governor Palin to succeed Alex Bryner, an associate justice. Winfree retired from the court in February 2023.

Legal offices
Preceded by Alex Bryner	Justice of the Alaska Supreme Court; 2008–2023	Succeeded by Jude Pate
Preceded by Joel Bolger	Chief Justice of the Alaska Supreme Court; 2021–2023	Succeeded by Peter J. Maassen
