= Jude Pate =

American judge

Justice of the Alaska Supreme Court
- Incumbent
- Assumed office March 22, 2023
- Appointed by: Mike Dunleavy
- Preceded by: Daniel Winfree

Personal details
- Born: Michael Jude Pate; 1965 (age 59–60) Nuremberg, Germany
- Education: University of Kansas (BS); Lewis and Clark College (JD)

Michael Jude Pate (born 1965)is an American lawyer who serves as a justice of the Alaska Supreme Court. He previously served as a judge of the Sitka Superior Court from 2018 to 2023.

== Early life and education ==
Pate was born in Nuremberg, Germany while his father was stationed in the U.S. Army, he spent his childhood primarily in the Netherlands and Kansas. He attended AFCENT High School in the Netherlands. He received a Bachelor of Science in journalism from the University of Kansas and a Juris Doctor from Lewis & Clark Law School.

== Career ==
From 1994 to 1999, Pate served as trial counsel for the Sitka Tribe of Alaska. From 1999 to 2006, he was in private practice and from 2006 to 2018 he was an assistant public defender. In February 2018, Governor Bill Walker appointed Pate as a judge of the Sitka superior court, to replace retiring Judge David George. He was sworn in on June 1, 2018.

=== Alaska Supreme Court ===
Pate was one of seven candidates who applied for the upcoming vacancy. On January 20, 2023, Governor Mike Dunleavy announced the appointment of Pate to the Alaska Supreme Court to fill the upcoming vacancy made by the mandatory retirement of Chief Justice Daniel Winfree. With his appointment, Pate is the first justice to come from someplace other than Juneau, Anchorage or Fairbanks since 1960. He assumed office in March 2023.

== Affiliations ==
Since 2010, Pate has coached the Sitka High School mock trials, been a member of the Judicial Conference Planning Committee since 2020 and a member of the Fairness, Diversity, and Equality Committee since 2018.

Legal offices
Preceded by Daniel Winfree	Justice of the Alaska Supreme Court; 2023–present	Incumbent
