= Stephen Eastaugh =

- Born: 28 July 1960 (age 65); Melbourne, Australia
- Occupation: Artist
- Years active: 1981-
- Known for: Semi-abstract Landscapes

Stephen Eastaugh (born 28 July 1960) is an Australian contemporary artist from Melbourne, Australia. He is known for producing semi-abstract, mixed media art, and his work is often informed by his experiences traveling.

== Career ==
Eastaugh studied at the Victorian College of the Arts from 1979 to 1981. After completing his Bachelors of Fine Art, he began to travel, first to New Zealand and Norway, and since then has not settled anywhere for more than a few months at a time. Since the early 1980s, he has participated in over 100 solo exhibitions and 100 group exhibitions in Australia and internationally. He is represented in many of Australia’s state and national art collections including the National Gallery of Australia, the National Gallery of Victoria and Parliament House Canberra.

In 2012 Eastaugh self-published Unstill Life, a book with a limited-edition of 500 copies, documenting his 30 years of traveling which he wrote over the winter of 2009 at Mawson station in Antarctica.

=== Artistic Style and Influences ===
Each of Eastaugh's semi-abstract, mixed-media artworks tells a story based on his travels, such as passing out after his drink was spiked in Peru (Drugs, 1990). Antarctichinoiserie-scape (2004), for example, was inspired by the rafting sea ice found in Antarctica while reminiscent of depictions of distance in Chinese landscape paintings.

Eastaugh calls his art of travel an ‘Unstill Life’. He has made nine trips to Antarctica: three trips as the official Australian Antarctic Arts fellow (2000, 2002–3, 2009), and six times as an artist-in-residence on tourist ships. He travelled twice to the North Pole as part of a Polar art residency on Russian icebreakers. Ulan Bator (Mongolia), Nuuk (Greenland), Nufa Alofa (Tonga), Ushuaia (Argentina) are among the 80 plus countries Eastaugh has visited. His 2006 Summer studio at Australia’s Davis Station in Antarctica was the subject of the ABC TV documentary AntarcticArt. On Eastaugh's third official trip to Antarctica he over-wintered at Mawson station.

The work Eastaugh produces in each country regularly uses materials that resonate with, or are particular to, the local culture. These materials have a strong textural quality: encaustic wax, oilsticks, medical bandages, rugs, fabric, embroidery, damaged paper and pearl shells. Rooted (Mongolia), 2004, for example, abstracts various Mongolian objects and views in 30 panels made from acrylic paint and embroidered medical bandages, wool and cotton thread.

== Personal life ==
An adopted child born in Melbourne, Australia Eastaugh made contact with his biological parents when he was 28. His biological father is a former Dutch sailor, based in Broome, Australia. In 2007 Eastaugh married Argentinian photographer and vigneron Carolina Furque in Hong Kong.

== Collections (selected) ==
- National Gallery of Australia, Canberra
- The National Gallery of Victoria, Melbourne
- The Art Gallery of Western Australia, Perth
- Museum of Contemporary Art, Sydney
- Tasmanian Museum and Art Gallery, Hobart
- Parliament House, Canberra
- Australian Antarctic Division Collection
- Kerry Stokes Collection, Perth
- Nevada Museum of Art, Reno

== Awards, grants, fellowships (selected) ==
- Asialink Residency, Hong Kong 2001 and Beijing 2012
- Art Gallery of NSW, Moya * Dyring Studio, Cite Internationale, Paris, 2001
- Australian Antarctic Division Artists' Program, 2000, 2002–3 and 2009
- Faber Castell National Drawing Award (Professional), 1991
