= Connie Boochever =

American actress

- Born: July 5, 1919
- Died: 1999 (aged 79–80)
- Occupations: Actress, director, producer

Lois Colleen Maddox (July 5, 1919 – 1999) better known as Connie Boochever was a performer, director and producer of community theater and lifelong patron and advocate for the arts.

== Early life and education ==
Lois Colleen Maddox was born in Decatur, Illinois, on July 5, 1919, to parents Kenneth and Flora Maddox. She later became known as Connie while attending Hurley Medical Center where she became a registered nurse.

== Career ==
Boochever worked as the chief surgery nurse on a military base where she met her future husband Robert Boochever.

She was a member of the first Alaska State Arts Council and then served as a governor’s appointee on the Council for 11 years. She founded Juneau, Alaska’s Community Theater and the Juneau Arts and Humanities Forum. She also founded Juneau Douglas Little Theater and served as its president. She was a board member of the Arts Alaska and the Alaska Repertory Theater.

== Awards and honors ==
She was named Juneau’s Woman of the Year in 1973. She received the Governor’s Award for the Arts for outstanding achievement in the arts in 1982 and was honored, in that year, by both houses of the State Legislature for her contributions to the arts in Alaska. In 2012, she was inducted into the Alaska Women's Hall of Fame for her contribution to the arts in Alaska. The Connie Boochever Artist Fellowship was created in 2001 by her family in her memory.

== Personal life ==
Boochever met first lieutenant and legal officer Robert Boochever while working on a base. They were married on April 22, 1943. Skier Hilary Lindh is one of their grandchildren.
