= Aimee A. Oravec =

American judge

Aimee Oravec

Justice of the Alaska Supreme Court
- Incumbent
- Assumed office January 31, 2025
- Appointed by: Mike Dunleavy
- Preceded by: Peter J. Maassen

Personal details
- Born: Aimee Cheri Anderson
- Education: College of Eastern Utah (AA); Southern Utah University (BA); Washington University (JD)

Aimee Anderson Oravec (born July 28, 1971) is an American lawyer who has served as a justice of the Alaska Supreme Court since 2025.

== Education ==
Oravec received an Associate of Arts from the College of Eastern Utah in 1991; a Bachelor of Arts from Southern Utah University in 1994 and a Juris Doctor from the Washington University School of Law in 1998, while receiving an Order of the Barristers.

== Career ==
From 1996 to 1998, Oravec was a law clerk and later associate at Schwartz, Herman & Davidson in St. Louis, Missouri. From 1999 to 2005, she was an associate attorney with Winfree Law Office, PC in Fairbanks. From May 2007 to May 2008 she was a of counsel and a contract attorney with Richmond & Quinn, PC in Anchorage. She also practiced as a sole practitioner from 2005 to 2008. From 2008 to 2014, she was a senior attorney at Oravec Law Group, LLC. From 2014 to 2016, she was vice president of Regulatory Strategy and Governance at Utility Services of Alaska, Inc. From 2016 to 2025, she was general counsel at Doyon Utilities, LLC.

=== Alaska Supreme Court ===
In November 2024, Oravec was one of three nominees submitted by the Alaska Judicial Council to the governor, all three nominees were women. On November 27, 2024, Governor Mike Dunleavy appointed Oravec to the Alaska Supreme Court to fill the vacancy left by the retirement of Justice Peter J. Maassen. With her appointment, the court gained a female majority for the first time. She was sworn into office on January 31, 2025.

== Personal life ==
Oravec's husband, Scott A. Oravec, is a lawyer who serves as a U.S. magistrate judge of the United States District Court for the District of Alaska.

Legal offices
Preceded by Peter J. Maassen	Justice of the Alaska Supreme Court; 2025–present	Incumbent
