= Peter J. Maassen =

American judge (born 1955)

Peter Maassen

Chief Justice of the Alaska Supreme Court
- In office February 7, 2023 – January 10, 2025
- Preceded by: Daniel Winfree
- Succeeded by: Susan M. Carney

Justice of the Alaska Supreme Court
- In office August 9, 2012 – January 13, 2025
- Appointed by: Sean Parnell
- Preceded by: Morgan Christen
- Succeeded by: Aimee A. Oravec

Personal details
- Born: January 14, 1955 (age 71) Anchorage, Alaska, U.S.
- Education: Hope College (BA); University of Michigan (JD)

Peter Jon Maassen (born January 14, 1955) is an American lawyer who served as the chief justice of the Alaska Supreme Court from 2023 to 2025. He was appointed in 2012, serving concurrently as an associate justice until 2025.

== Education ==
Maassen received a Bachelor of Arts from Hope College in 1977 and a Juris Doctor from the University of Michigan Law School in 1980.

== Career ==
From June to August 1979 Maassen was a law clerk in general litigation practice Maun, Green, Hayes, Simon, Murray and Johannesen in Minneapolis. From January 1980 to 1987 he was a law clerk turned associate with Burr, Pease and Kurtz, P.C. in Anchorage. In 1988 he worked in the Office of General Counsel at the United States Department of Commerce. From November 1988 to September 1989, he was an associate with Bishop, Cook, Purcell and Reynolds in Washington, D.C., he returned to Alaska and from 1990 to 1994, he was a partner with Burr, Pease and Kurtz, P.C. From 1994 to 2012, he was a founding partner with Ingaldson, Maassen and Fitzgerald, P.C.

=== Alaska Supreme Court ===
In August 2012, Maassen was appointed by Governor Sean Parnell to the Alaska Supreme Court to replace Justice Morgan Christen, who was elevated to the United States Court of Appeals for the Ninth Circuit.

In November 2022, he was named Chief Justice of the Alaska Supreme Court, succeeding Daniel Winfree. His term as chief justice began on February 7, 2023.

Legal offices
Preceded by Morgan Christen	Justice of the Alaska Supreme Court; 2012–2025	Succeeded by Aimee A. Oravec
Preceded by Daniel Winfree	Chief Justice of the Alaska Supreme Court; 2023–2025	Succeeded by Susan M. Carney
