= Allen T. Compton =

American judge (1938–2008)

Allen Trimble Compton (February 25, 1938 – October 11, 2008) was an American jurist who served as a justice of the Supreme Court of Alaska from December 12, 1980, until shortly before his death, including serving as the court's chief justice from 1995 to 1997.

Born in Kansas City, Missouri, Compton received a B.A. from the University of Kansas in 1960, followed by a law degree from the University of Colorado Law School in 1963. After serving for six years in the United States Marine Corps Reserve, he became a legal services attorney, first in Colorado Springs, and then in Juneau, Alaska.

In 1976, Governor Jay Hammond appointed Compton to the superior court, in Juneau. In 1980, Hammond elevated Compton to a seat on the Alaska Supreme Court. In September 1995, Chief Justice Danny Moore retired, and the justices chose Compton to succeed him as chief justice. In July 1997, Compton stepped down as chief justice following a private rebuke from the Alaska Commission on Judicial Conduct concerning sexual harassment allegations made by two female court employees. He thereafter remained on the court as an associate justice, until he retired in 1998.

Political offices
Preceded by Robert Boochever	Justice of the Alaska Supreme Court; 1980–1998	Succeeded by Walter L. Carpeneti
