= Joel Bolger =

American judge

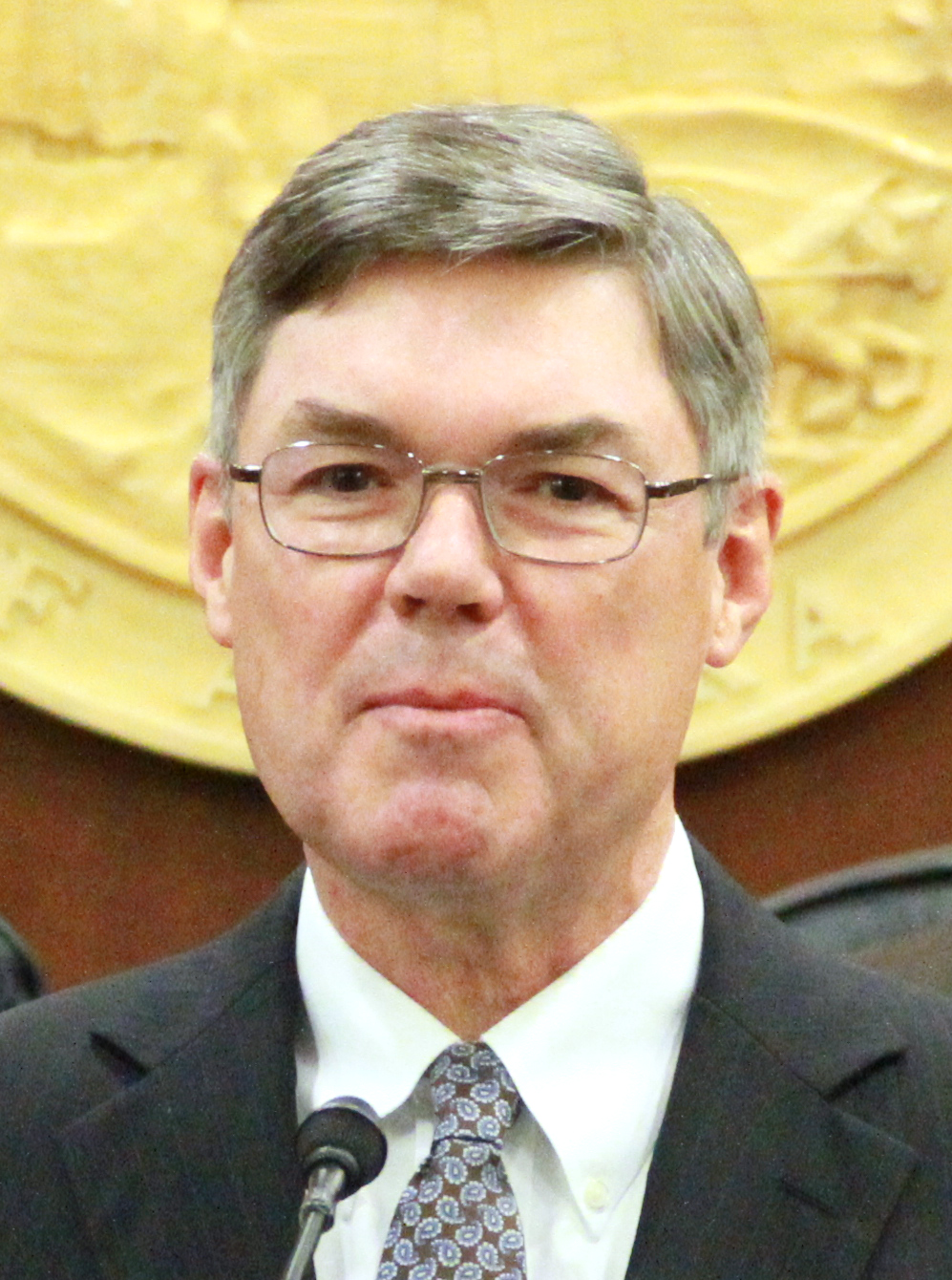
- Bolger, February 2019

Chief Justice of the Alaska Supreme Court
- In office July 1, 2018 – June 30, 2021
- Preceded by: Craig Stowers
- Succeeded by: Daniel Winfree

Associate Justice of the Alaska Supreme Court
- In office January 25, 2013 – June 30, 2021
- Appointed by: Sean Parnell
- Preceded by: Walter L. Carpeneti
- Succeeded by: Jennifer S. Henderson

Personal details
- Born: Joel Harold Bolger; February 16, 1955 (age 71) Carroll, Iowa, U.S.
- Education: University of Iowa (BS, JD)

Joel Harold Bolger (born February 16, 1955, in Carroll, Iowa) is an American lawyer and former jurist. He served as a justice of the Alaska Supreme Court from 2013 to 2021 and as chief justice from 2018 to 2021.

He was a judge of the Alaska Court of Appeals (the state's intermediate appellate court) from October 2008 until his appointment to the high court. Before being a judge, he worked as a lawyer throughout Alaska after arriving in the late 1970s. He also served as a state trial court judge in Kodiak and Valdez.

On November 30, 2020, Bolger announced that he would retire on June 30, 2021.

Legal offices
Preceded by Walter L. Carpeneti	Associate Justice of the Alaska Supreme Court; 2013–2021	Succeeded by Jennifer S. Henderson
Preceded by Craig Stowers	Chief Justice of the Alaska Supreme Court; 2018–2021	Succeeded by Daniel Winfree
