= George F. Boney =

American judge (1930–1972)

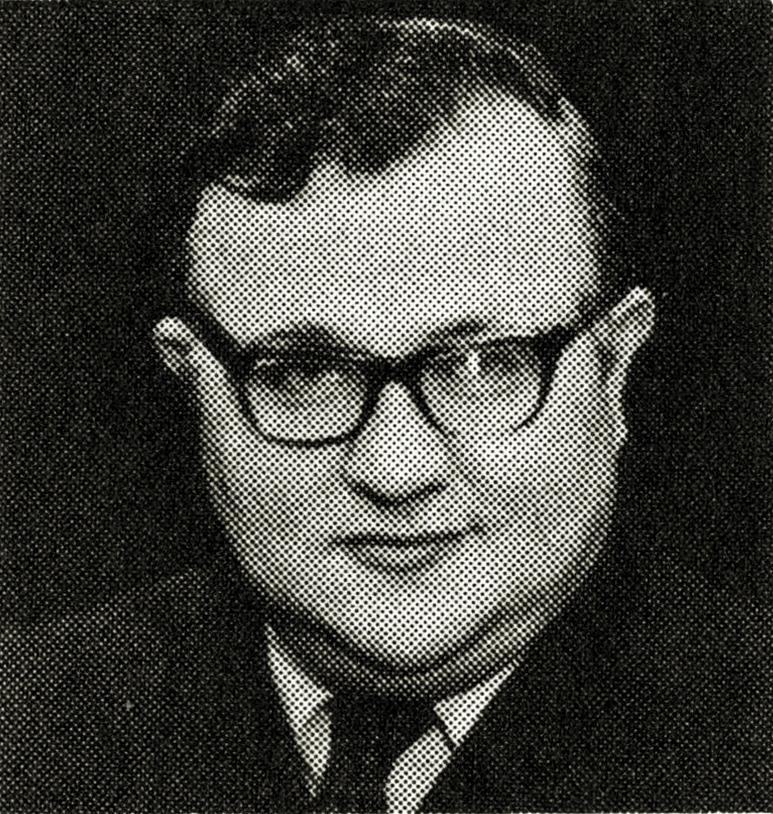

George Frank Boney (July 3, 1930 – August 30, 1972) was a justice of the Alaska Supreme Court from December 2, 1968, until his death, serving as chief justice after 1970.

== Early life and career ==
Born in Savannah, Georgia, Boney received an undergraduate degree from the University of Georgia in Athens in 1951 and a law degree from Harvard Law School in Cambridge, Massachusetts. He became a senior partner in the largest law firm in Alaska.

== Judicial career ==
In 1968, Governor Wally Hickel appointed Boney and Roger G. Connor to two newly created seats on the state supreme court, expanding the court from three justices to five.

After the retirement of Buell A. Nesbett in 1970, Boney was named by Governor Keith Miller to serve as the court's second chief justice, becoming the youngest chief justice of any state supreme court at the time. He died in a boating accident at Cheri Lake, Matanuska-Susitna. The older of the two state courthouses in Anchorage, which is the one in which the Supreme Court holds its sessions, is named in his honor.
