= Edmond W. Burke =

American judge (1935–2020)

Edmond Wayne Burke (September 7, 1935 – March 31, 2020) was a justice of the Alaska Supreme Court from April 4, 1975, to December 1, 1993. He also served a term as chief justice from November 16, 1981, to September 30, 1984.

Born in Ukiah, California, where his father was a judge, Burke received his J.D. from the University of California, Hastings College of the Law in 1964. He was a judge of the Alaska Superior Court from 1970 until his appointment to the Alaska Supreme Court by Governor Jay Hammond in 1975.

Political offices
Preceded by James Martin Fitzgerald	Justice of the Alaska Supreme Court; 1975–1993	Succeeded by Robert Ladd Eastaugh
