= Buell A. Nesbett =

American judge

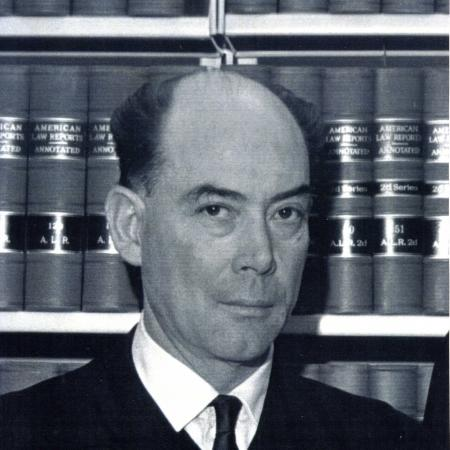

Chief Justice of the Alaska Supreme Court
- In office 1959–1971

Personal details
- Born: June 2, 1910 New Mexico
- Died: August 17, 1993 (aged 83) Anchorage, Alaska
- Education: University of San Francisco School of Law

Buell A. Nesbett
- Allegiance: United States
- Branch: United States Navy
- Awards: Bronze Star Medal

Buell Arthur Nesbett (sometimes misspelled as Nesbitt; June 2, 1910 in New Mexico – August 17, 1993 in Anchorage, Alaska) was an American soldier, lawyer, businessman, and the first chief justice of the Alaska Supreme Court. Born in New Mexico, he earned a law degree at the University of San Francisco in San Francisco in 1940 and served with distinction in the U.S. Navy during World War II, commanding the USS Atlas and earning a Bronze Star.

He moved to Anchorage, Alaska after the war and practiced law until being appointed in 1959 to be the first chief justice of the newly created Alaska Supreme Court. Given three years to set up the new state's courts, he accomplished the job in six months. He served on the court until 1970, when an airplane accident led him to resign for health reasons.

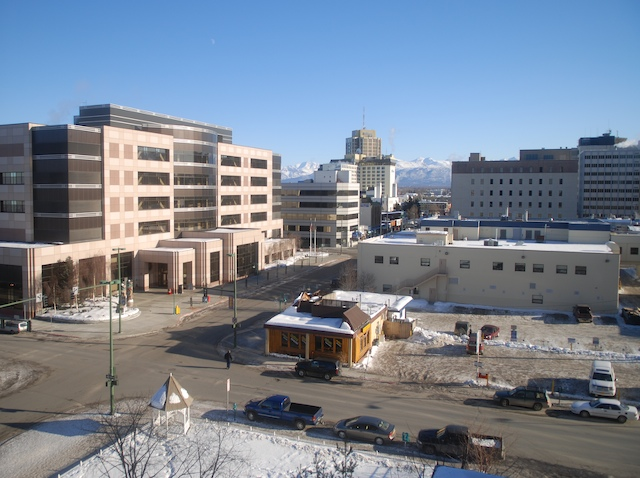
Downtown Anchorage, the Nesbett Courthouse is at left, February 2007

Nesbett was also involved with an effort to operate an Alaskan coal mine; he was the president of the Buffalo Coal Mining Company and suffered financial losses when the company was unable to successfully reopen the mine.

== Background ==
Nesbett married Enid Elsie "Barbara" Allen, an English nurse whom he met in England during World War II. He died of leukemia in Anchorage in 1993, at the age of 83. He was survived by his wife, six children (two sons and four daughters), and 11 grandchildren. The state courthouse in Anchorage is named in his honor.
