= Judiciary of Alaska =

U.S. state judicial system

The Alaska Court System is the judicial system for the state of Alaska. The Alaska District Courts are the primary misdemeanor trial courts, the Alaska Superior Courts are the primary felony trial courts, and the Alaska Supreme Court and the Alaska Court of Appeals are the primary appellate courts. The chief justice of the Alaska Supreme Court is the administrative head of the Alaska Court System.

== Courts ==
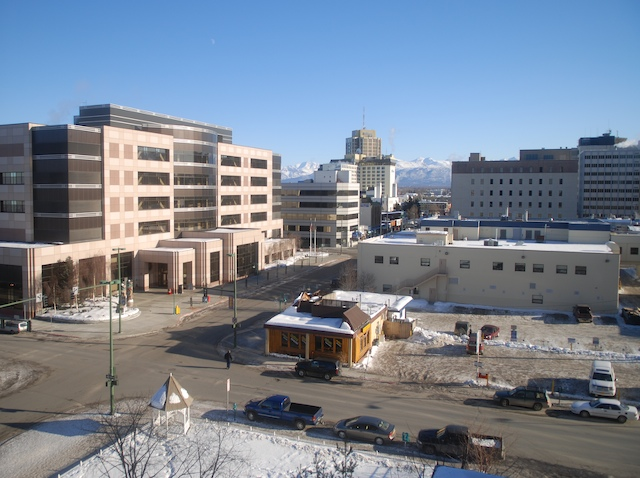
The western end of Fourth Avenue in downtown Anchorage. The Nesbett Courthouse (named in honor of Buell A. Nesbett) is at left. The administrative offices for the court system are in the smaller building at right foreground, formerly the home of the Anchorage Times newspaper.

Alaska has four levels of state courts:

- the supreme court;
- the court of appeals;
- the superior courts; and
- the district courts.

The district courts are the primary misdemeanor trial courts, the superior courts are the primary felony trial courts although they also sometimes hear appeals from the district courts, and the supreme court and the court of appeals are the primary appellate courts.

Alaska is separated into 4 judicial districts.

=== Supreme Court ===
The Alaska Supreme Court is the state supreme court. The supreme court is composed of the chief justice and four associate justices. They choose one of their own members to serve a three-year term as chief justice.

The decisions of the Alaska Supreme Court are binding on all other Alaska state courts, and the only other court that may reverse or modify those decisions is the Supreme Court of the United States. The Supreme Court hears appeals from lower state courts and also administers the state's judicial system. The Alaska Supreme Court is required to hear appeals in civil cases in the first instance and is not able to exercise its discretion whether to consider appeals previously heard by other appellate courts.

=== Court of Appeals ===
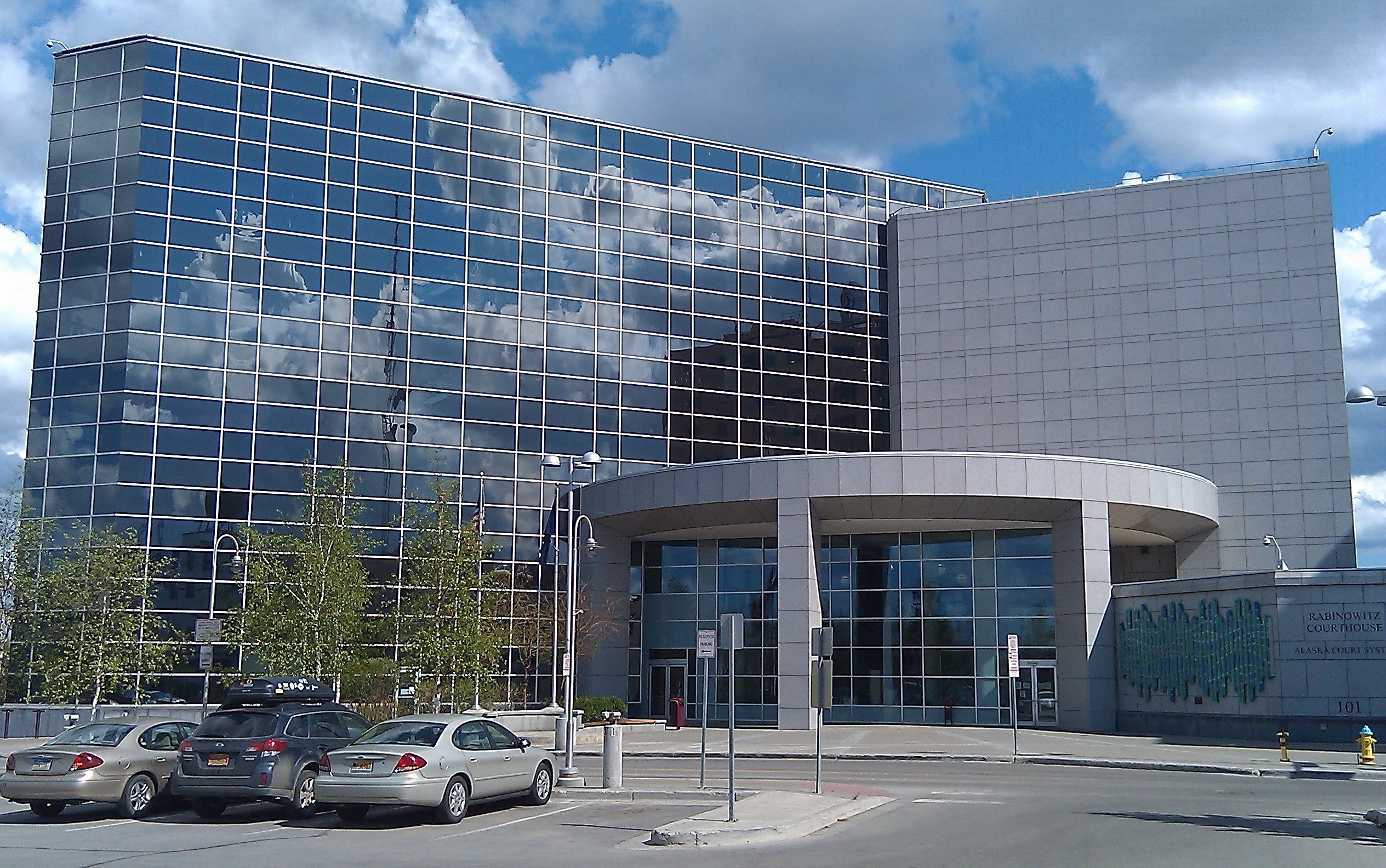
The Rabinowitz Courthouse in downtown Fairbanks.

The Alaska Court of Appeals is an intermediary court of appeals for criminal cases, and is composed of a chief judge and two associate judges. The chief judge of the court of appeals is selected from among the three by the chief justice of the supreme court to serve a two-year term. The court of appeals has jurisdiction to hear appeals from judgments in criminal cases and certain other quasi-criminal cases in which a minor is accused of committing a crime (juvenile delinquency cases), cases in which prisoners are challenging the legality of their confinement (habeas corpus and post-conviction relief matters), and cases involving probation and parole decisions. Also, a defendant in a criminal case who appeals from district court to superior court can ask the court of appeals to review the resulting decision of the superior court, but the court of appeals may, in its discretion, refuse to hear the appeal.

=== Superior courts ===
The Alaska superior courts are the trial courts of general jurisdiction. The court hears appeals from the district court.

=== District courts ===
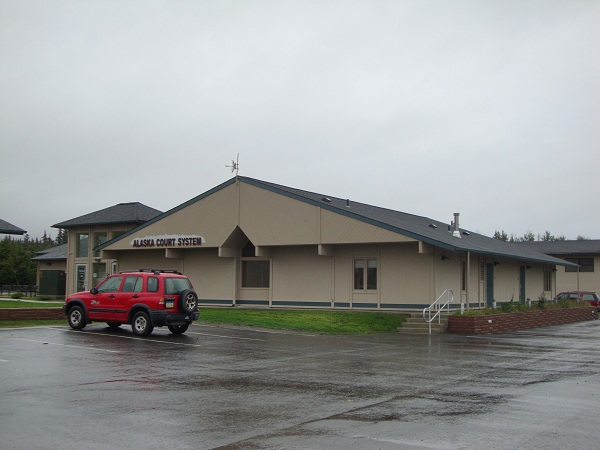
The court in Homer, Alaska, which was formerly a district court before being made a superior court in 2020.

The Alaska district courts are lower trial courts that can hear misdemeanor criminal cases and civil cases where the amount in controversy is less than $100,000. They have historically been Alaska's busiest courts. District court judges also issue arrest warrants and search warrants and handle arraignments, and may also serve as coroners, hold inquests, and record vital statistics. In 1992 there were 17 statewide.

=== Magistrate courts ===
Magistrates may issue writs, marriage licenses, summonses, arrest and search warrants, and notarizations. They may also handle preliminary proceedings in criminal cases.

== Administration ==
The chief justice of the Alaska Supreme Court is the administrative head of the Alaska court system. An administrative director is appointed by the chief justice with concurrence of the supreme court. The director supervises the administration of all courts in the state. Rules governing the administration of all courts and the rules of practice and procedure for civil and criminal cases are promulgated by the supreme court. The Alaska legislature may change the court's procedural rules by passing an act expressing its intent to do so by a two-thirds majority of both houses.

The Alaska Bar Association is the mandatory association responsible for the admission and discipline process of attorneys and administering the bar examination. It is responsible to the Alaska Supreme Court. It is governed by a board of governors with nine attorneys and three public members.

The Alaska Judicial Council nominates judges for vacancies after accepting applications and surveying Alaska Bar Association members to assess each candidate. The Alaska Judicial Council also solicits opinions from Alaska Bar Association members, police officers, and probation officers concerning judges in retention elections and publish recommendations that appear in voter pamphlets.

The Alaska Commission on Judicial Conduct makes recommendations regarding disqualification, suspension, removal, retirement, and censure of judges. It is composed of 3 judges appointed by judges, 3 lawyers appointed by the Alaska Bar Association, and 3 citizens appointed by the governor and confirmed by the legislature.

In addition, the office of the clerk of the appellate courts supports the work of the supreme court and the court of appeals. The clerk is required to be an attorney. The clerk's responsibilities include monitoring the caseflow through the supreme court and the court of appeals and making recommendations for improvements in appellate procedure. The clerk is also responsible for all case filing and calendaring, publishing opinions, and related tasks. The clerk's office is located in Anchorage, and deputy clerks are located in Juneau, Anchorage, and Fairbanks. Marilyn May was appointed clerk of the appellate courts in October 1998.

== Officers ==
=== Judges ===
Alaska uses a Missouri Plan merit selection system for judges and justices. The governor appoints a justice or judge from a list of qualified candidates submitted by the Alaska Judicial Council. The governor has 45 days from receipt of the list to make the appointment. All judges and justices in Alaska must stand for judicial retention elections (approval by the voters) on a nonpartisan ballot at the first statewide general election held more than three years after appointment (two for District Court judges), and periodically thereafter. Magistrates are appointed by the presiding superior court judge of a judicial district.

== History ==
The supreme court and the superior courts were established in the Alaska constitution, which took effect upon statehood in 1959. Later that year, the Alaska legislature created a district court for each judicial district and granted power to the supreme court to increase or decrease the number of district court judges. In 1980, to ease the appellate burden on the supreme court, the legislature created a court of appeals.

== See also ==
- Law enforcement in Alaska
