= Robert Boochever =

American judge (1917–2011)

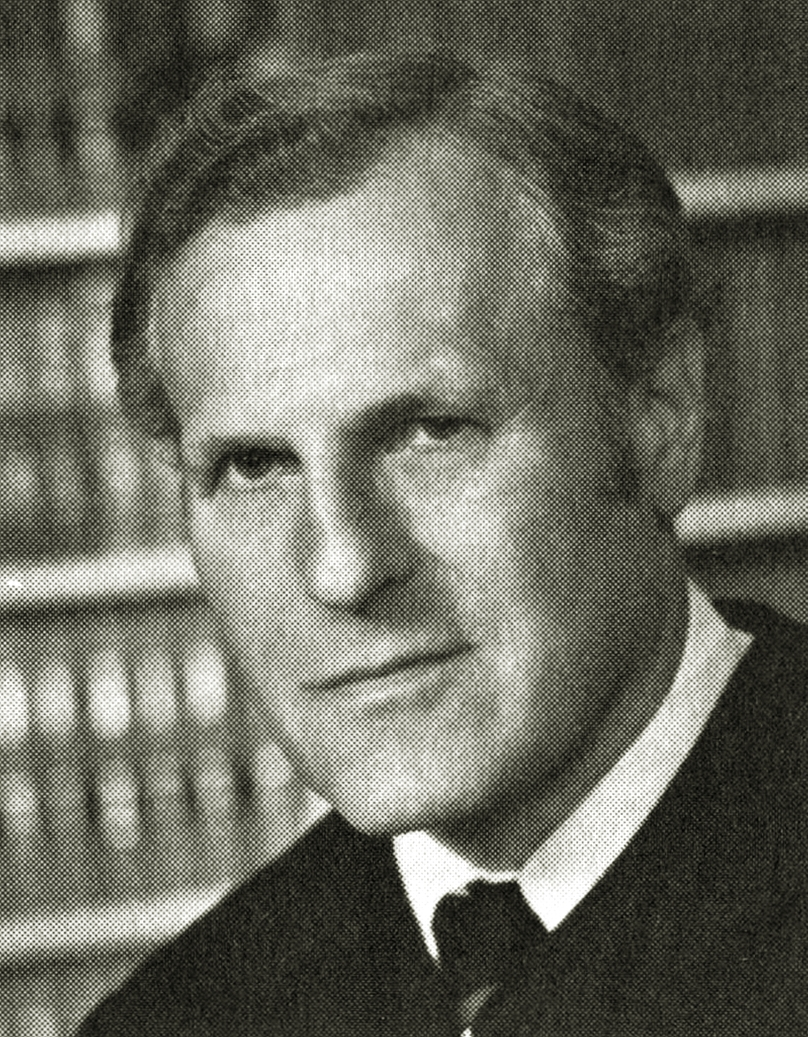

Senior Judge of the United States Court of Appeals for the Ninth Circuit
- In office June 10, 1986 – October 9, 2011

Judge of the United States Court of Appeals for the Ninth Circuit
- In office June 18, 1980 – June 10, 1986
- Appointed by: Jimmy Carter
- Preceded by: Shirley Hufstedler
- Succeeded by: Diarmuid O'Scannlain

Associate Justice of the Alaska Supreme Court
- In office March 22, 1972 – October 1980
- Appointed by: William A. Egan
- Preceded by: John H. Dimond
- Succeeded by: Allen T. Compton

Personal details
- Born: October 2, 1917 New York City, U.S.
- Died: October 9, 2011 (aged 94) Pasadena, California, U.S.
- Spouse: Connie Boochever (m. 1943; died 1999)
- Relations: Hilary Lindh (granddaughter)
- Education: Cornell University (BA); Cornell Law School (LLB)

Robert Boochever (October 2, 1917 – October 9, 2011) was a United States circuit judge of the United States Court of Appeals for the Ninth Circuit and a justice of the Alaska Supreme Court.

== Education and career ==
Born in New York City, Boochever received a Bachelor of Arts degree from Cornell University in 1939 where he was a member of the Quill and Dagger society, and a Bachelor of Laws from Cornell Law School in 1941. He was a captain in the United States Army Infantry during World War II, from 1941 to 1945. He was an assistant United States attorney in Juneau, Alaska from 1946 to 1947 and then worked in private practice in Juneau until 1972. He was a justice of the Alaska Supreme Court from 1972 to 1980, serving as chief justice from 1975 to 1978.

== Federal judicial service ==
On May 22, 1980, Boochever was nominated by President Jimmy Carter to a seat on the United States Court of Appeals for the Ninth Circuit vacated by Judge Shirley Hufstedler. He was confirmed by the United States Senate on June 18, 1980, and received his commission the same day. He assumed senior status on June 10, 1986, due to a certified disability. He served in that capacity until his death, though he did not hear any new cases in the last few years of his life.

== Personal life and death ==
Boochever met chief surgery nurse Connie Boochever while working on a base. They were married on April 22, 1943. Skier Hilary Lindh is one of their grandchildren.

Boochever died of natural causes on October 9, 2011, at the age of 94 at his home in Pasadena, California.

Legal offices
Preceded by John H. Dimond	Associate Justice of the Alaska Supreme Court; 1972–1980	Succeeded by Allen T. Compton
Preceded by Shirley Hufstedler	Judge of the United States Court of Appeals for the Ninth Circuit; 1980–1986	Succeeded by Diarmuid O'Scannlain
