= Alaska Supreme Court =

Highest court in the U.S. state of Alaska

- Established: 1959
- Location: Anchorage; Fairbanks; Juneau
- Composition method: Missouri plan with retention elections
- Authorised by: Alaska State Constitution
- Appeals to: Supreme Court of the United States (questions of federal or constitutional law only)
- Judge term length: 10 years
- Number of positions: 5
- Website: Official site

Chief Justice
- Currently: Susan M. Carney
- Since: January 10, 2025

The Alaska Supreme Court is the state supreme court for the U.S. state of Alaska. Its decisions are binding on all other Alaska state courts, and the only court its decisions may be appealed to is the Supreme Court of the United States. The Alaska Supreme Court hears appeals from lower state courts and also administers the state's judicial system.

The court consists of five justices, one of whom is internally chosen to serve as chief justice for a three-year term. The justices are appointed by the governor of Alaska from slates of candidates approved by the Alaska Judicial Council, an independent commission of Alaskan lawyers and lay citizens. Each justice faces a judicial retention election after their third year of service and once every ten years thereafter.

It hears cases on a monthly basis in Anchorage, approximately quarterly in Fairbanks and Juneau, and as needed in other Alaska communities. The court prefers to hear oral arguments in the city where the case was heard in the trial court.

== History ==
Alaska's supreme court was founded along with the rest of Alaska's court system, about six months after statehood. From 1884 until the establishment of Alaska Supreme Court, the United States Territorial District Court for the District of Alaska was the highest judicial body in Alaska.

The court originally consisted of two associate justices and a chief justice. In 1967, the court was expanded to five justices, and the chief justice was restricted to a three-year term.

== Appointment and retention ==
Like all Alaska state court judges, Alaska Supreme Court justices are appointed under a Missouri Plan system. The governor of Alaska appoints justices from lists of qualified candidates submitted by the Alaska Judicial Council, an independent seven-member commission composed of at least three lawyers and at least three non-lawyers from various parts of the state appointed on a non-partisan basis.

To be eligible for appointment, a person must be a citizen of the United States and a resident of Alaska for five years prior to appointment. A justice must be licensed to practice law in Alaska at the time of appointment and must have engaged in the active practice of law for eight years.

The appointed justice must be approved by the voters on a nonpartisan ballot at the first statewide general election held more than three years after appointment; thereafter, each justice must participate in another retention election every ten years.

== Jurisdiction ==
The supreme court has final state appellate jurisdiction in both civil and criminal law matters. It must accept appeals from final decisions by the superior court in civil cases (including cases which originated in administrative agencies). Until the creation of the court of appeals in 1980, the supreme court was also required to accept appeals from final decisions in criminal cases; now, however, the court of appeals fills this role, although the supreme court still has jurisdiction to exercise its discretion to accept appeals from decisions of the court of appeals (or upon certification from the court of appeals that the case involves a significant question of constitutional law or an issue of substantial public interest). In addition, the supreme court may, at its discretion, hear petitions from non-final decisions by lower courts or original applications in matters in which relief is not otherwise available, including admission to the bar association and attorney discipline matters, as well as questions of state law certified from the United States federal courts.

== Decisions ==
The court meets after oral argument and on a bi-weekly basis to confer on cases argued orally and on cases submitted on the briefs. The court usually announces its decisions of the cases by issuing opinions for official publication (in Westlaw, the Pacific Reporter and the Alaska Reporter) as well as memorandum opinions and judgments (MO&Js) and orders summarily ruling on the merits of cases or dismissing them. Although the MO&Js and most orders are not published, the MO&Js are available for public inspection at the Anchorage, Fairbanks, and Juneau offices of the clerk of the appellate courts, and the orders are filed in the clerk's Anchorage office. Current MO&Js are also available on the Alaska Court System website.

== Rules and administration ==
Under the Alaska Constitution, the supreme court establishes rules for the administration of all courts in the state and for practice and procedure in civil and criminal cases. The supreme court has further adopted rules for the practice of law in Alaska and procedural rules for children's matters, probate, and appeals. The Alaska Legislature may change the court's procedural rules by passing an act expressing its intent to do so by a two-thirds majority of both houses.

== The chief justice ==
The five supreme court justices, by majority vote, select one of their members to be the chief justice. The chief justice holds that office for three years and may not serve consecutive terms. The chief justice is also the administrative head of the Alaska Court System. Susan M. Carney was named Chief Justice in November 2024 after the mandatory retirement of her predecessor, Justice Peter Maassen.

== Current membership ==
Name	Born	Start	Chief term	Term ends	Mandatory retirement (Note: Like all Alaska state court judges, justices must retire when they reach age 70.)	Appointer	Law school
Susan M. Carney, Chief Justice	June 17, 1961 (age 65)	August 26, 2016	2025–present	2030	2031	Bill Walker (I)	Harvard
Dario Borghesan	December 11, 1979 (age 46)	July 1, 2020	–	2034	2049	Mike Dunleavy (R)	Michigan
Jennifer S. Henderson	June 10, 1976 (age 50)	July 7, 2021	–	2034	2046	Mike Dunleavy (R)	Yale
Jude Pate	1965 (age 60–61)	March 22, 2023	–	2036	2035	Mike Dunleavy (R)	Lewis and Clark
Aimee A. Oravec	July 28, 1971 (age 55)	January 31, 2025	–	2028	2041	Mike Dunleavy (R)	WashU

== See also ==
- Judiciary of Alaska
