= Mark Begich =

American politician (born 1962)

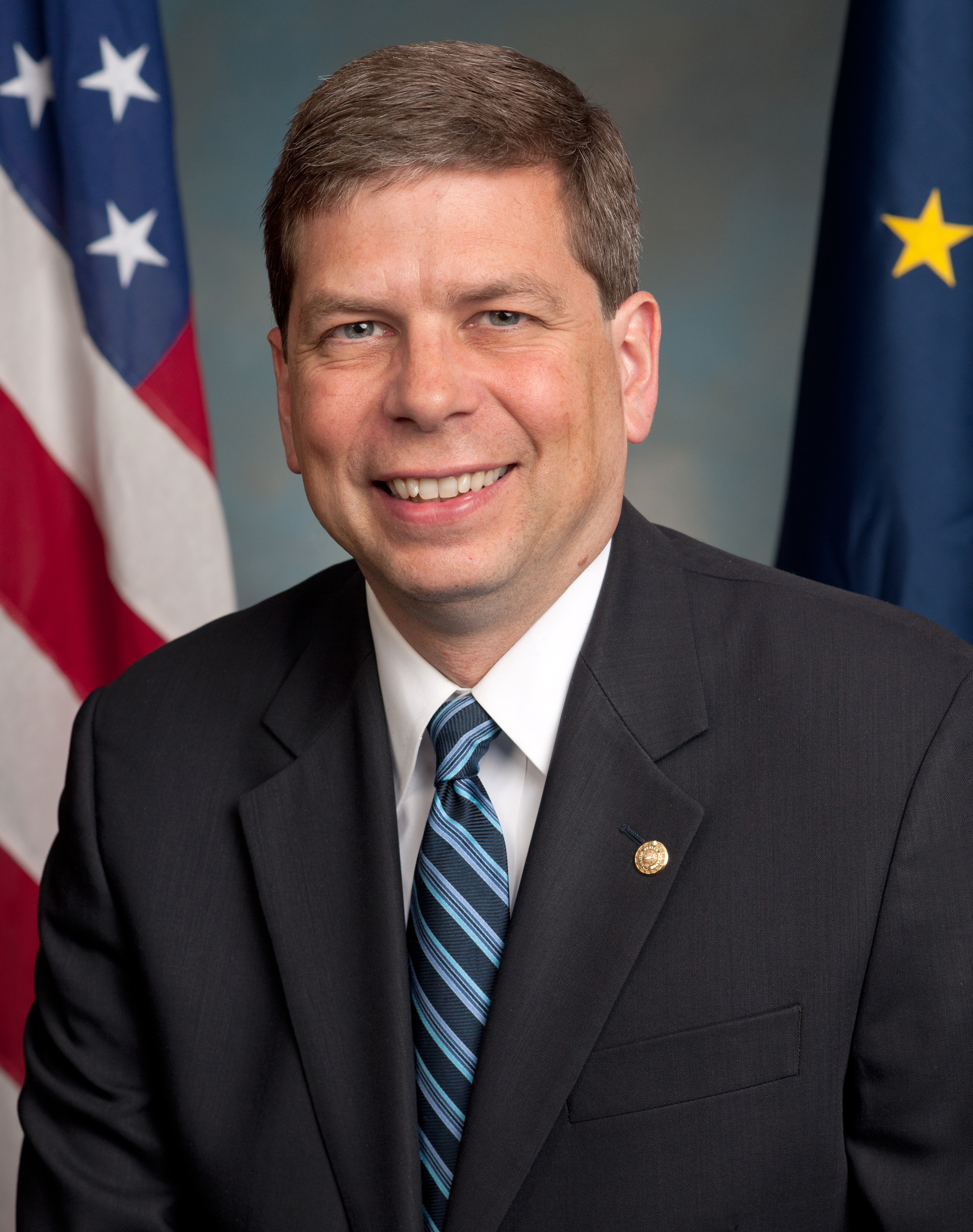
- Official portrait, 2012

Chair of the Senate Democratic Steering and Outreach Committee
- In office January 3, 2011 – January 3, 2015
- Leader: Harry Reid
- Preceded by: Debbie Stabenow
- Succeeded by: Amy Klobuchar

United States Senator from Alaska
- In office January 3, 2009 – January 3, 2015
- Preceded by: Ted Stevens
- Succeeded by: Dan Sullivan

34th Mayor of Anchorage
- In office July 1, 2003 – January 3, 2009
- Preceded by: George Wuerch
- Succeeded by: Dan Sullivan

Chair of the Anchorage Assembly
- In office April 30, 1996 – May 5, 1998
- Preceded by: Craig Campbell
- Succeeded by: Fay Von Gemmingen
- In office May 4, 1993 – December 7, 1993
- Preceded by: James Barnett
- Succeeded by: Dick Traini

Member of the Anchorage Assembly from Seat H
- In office October 4, 1988 – April 21, 1998
- Preceded by: Brad Bradley
- Succeeded by: Melinda Taylor

Personal details
- Born: Mark Peter Begich; March 30, 1962 (age 64) Anchorage, Alaska, U.S.
- Party: Democratic
- Spouse: Deborah Bonito (m. 1990)
- Children: 1
- Relatives: Nick Begich Sr. (father); Tom Begich (brother); Joseph Begich (uncle); Nick Begich III (nephew)
- Begich's voice Begich's opening statement at a Senate Veterans' Affairs Committee hearing on the Veterans Health Administration issues. Recorded May 15, 2014

Mark Peter Begich (/ˈbɛɡɪtʃ/ BEGG-itch; born March 30, 1962) is an American politician and lobbyist who served as a United States senator from Alaska from 2009 to 2015. A member of the Democratic Party, he served as mayor of Anchorage from 2003 to 2009. He was the last Democrat to be elected to the U.S. Senate from Alaska until Mary Peltola in 2026.

Begich was born in Anchorage, making him the first US Senator native to the state. He is the son of former US Representative Nick Begich Sr. He was elected to the Anchorage Assembly at the age of 26. He eventually served as chairman for three years, before leaving the Assembly in 1998. Begich ran two unsuccessful campaigns for Mayor of Anchorage in 1994 and 2000 before being elected in 2003. He was reelected in 2006. In the 2008 Senate election, Begich narrowly defeated incumbent Ted Stevens, at the time the longest-serving Republican member of the US Senate. His victory as a Democrat in Republican-dominated Alaska was largely considered an upset, owing to a guilty verdict for seven counts of false statements during a 7-year investigation by the Department of Justice.

In the 2014 Senate election, Begich was narrowly defeated in his bid for reelection by former Alaska Attorney General Dan Sullivan. Following completion of his term in the US Senate, Begich started Anchorage-based consulting firm Northern Compass Group. On June 1, 2018, Begich announced his candidacy for the Democratic nomination for Governor of Alaska in the 2018 election, facing off against Republican nominee and former state senator Mike Dunleavy. He lost the gubernatorial election by a margin of seven percentage points.

== Early life, education, and early political career ==
Begich was born and raised in Anchorage, Alaska. He is the son of Margaret Jean "Pegge" (née Jendro) and former US Representative Nick Begich. His father disappeared in October 1972 during a small plane flight from Anchorage to Juneau, Alaska with then-US House Majority Leader Hale Boggs, but was reelected the next month, while missing, before both were declared legally dead.

The fourth of six children, he has two sisters and three brothers. His paternal grandparents were Croatian; his paternal grandfather, John Begich, immigrated to the United States from Croatia (then part of the empire of Austria-Hungary) in 1911. His mother had Polish, Bohemian (Czech), Dutch, and English ancestry. He attended Steller Secondary School in Anchorage. As an adolescent, he opened an 18-and-under club called "The Motherlode". At the age of 18, he had obtained a business license to sell jewelry and was helping his mother manage a number of real estate properties. Because of his business opportunities, he decided not to go to college.

His mother, who had filled her late husband's seat in a 1973 special election, ran twice against longtime Congressional Representative Don Young in the 1980s, losing both times.

At the age of 19, Begich started working in the Anchorage city health department and later worked as a driver for then-Anchorage Mayor Tony Knowles. During the 1988 legislative session, Begich worked as a legislative aide for State Representative Dave Donley. Begich was elected to the Anchorage Assembly in 1988, at age 26, and served until 1998, including three years as chairman and two as vice chairman.

Begich served for a number of years on the Alaska Commission on Postsecondary Education, including as its chair. In 2001, Governor Tony Knowles appointed Begich to the University of Alaska Board of Regents, but the legislature did not confirm the appointment.

== Mayor of Anchorage ==
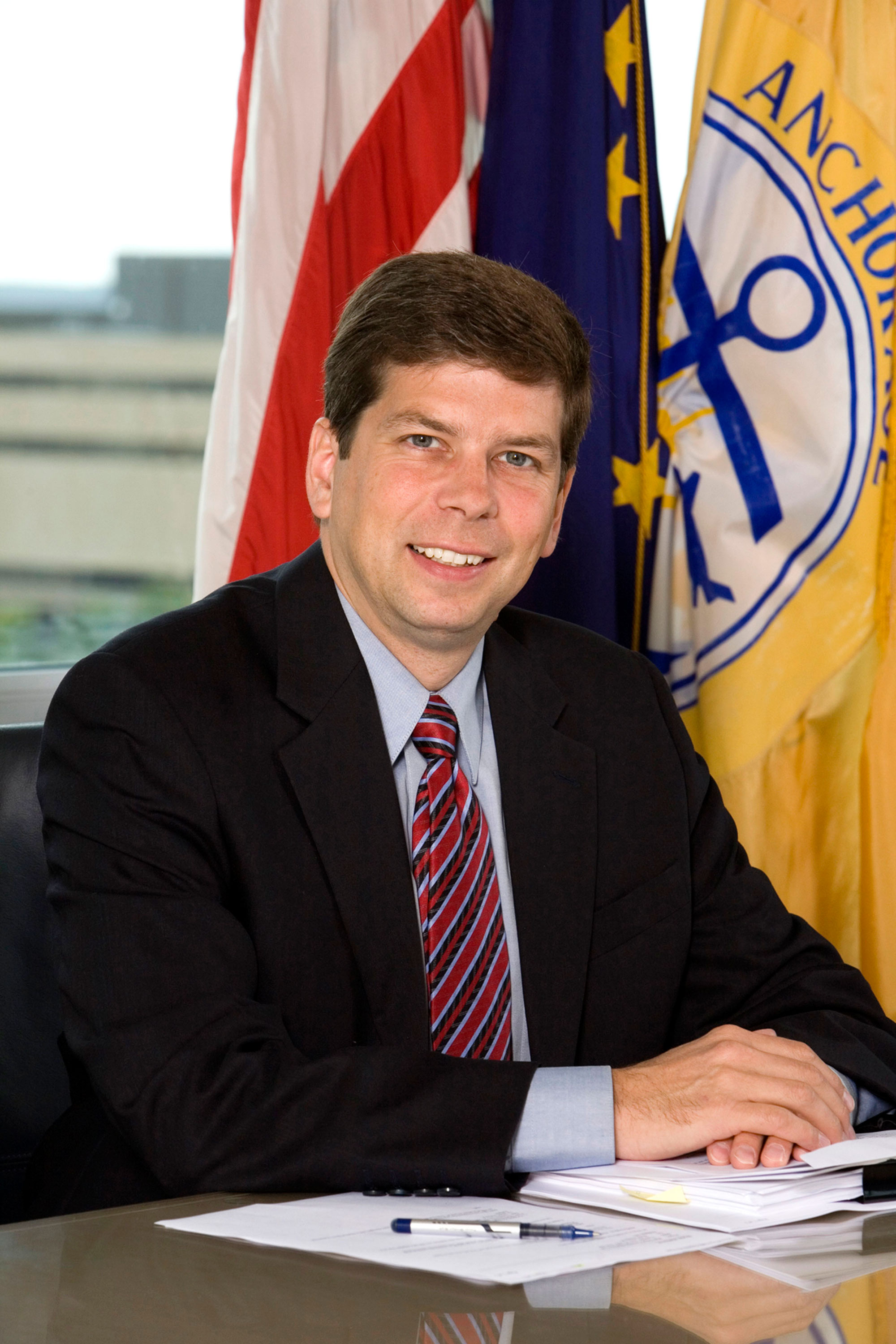
Begich as mayor of Anchorage

Begich ran unsuccessfully for mayor in 1994 against Rick Mystrom and in 2000 against then‑Assemblyman George Wuerch. In the 2003 mayoral race, he narrowly defeated both Mystrom and Wuerch, receiving only 11 votes more than the 45‑percent threshold required to avoid a runoff under a law approved simultaneously with the election.

He was reelected in April 2006, defeating local advertising and radio personality Jack Frost. Although the office is officially nonpartisan, Begich became the first Democrat to serve as Mayor of the Municipality of Anchorage since Tony Knowles.

Begich was a member of the pro-gun-control group Mayors Against Illegal Guns. Begich left the group in 2007.

== United States Senator ==
=== Elections ===
==== 2008 ====
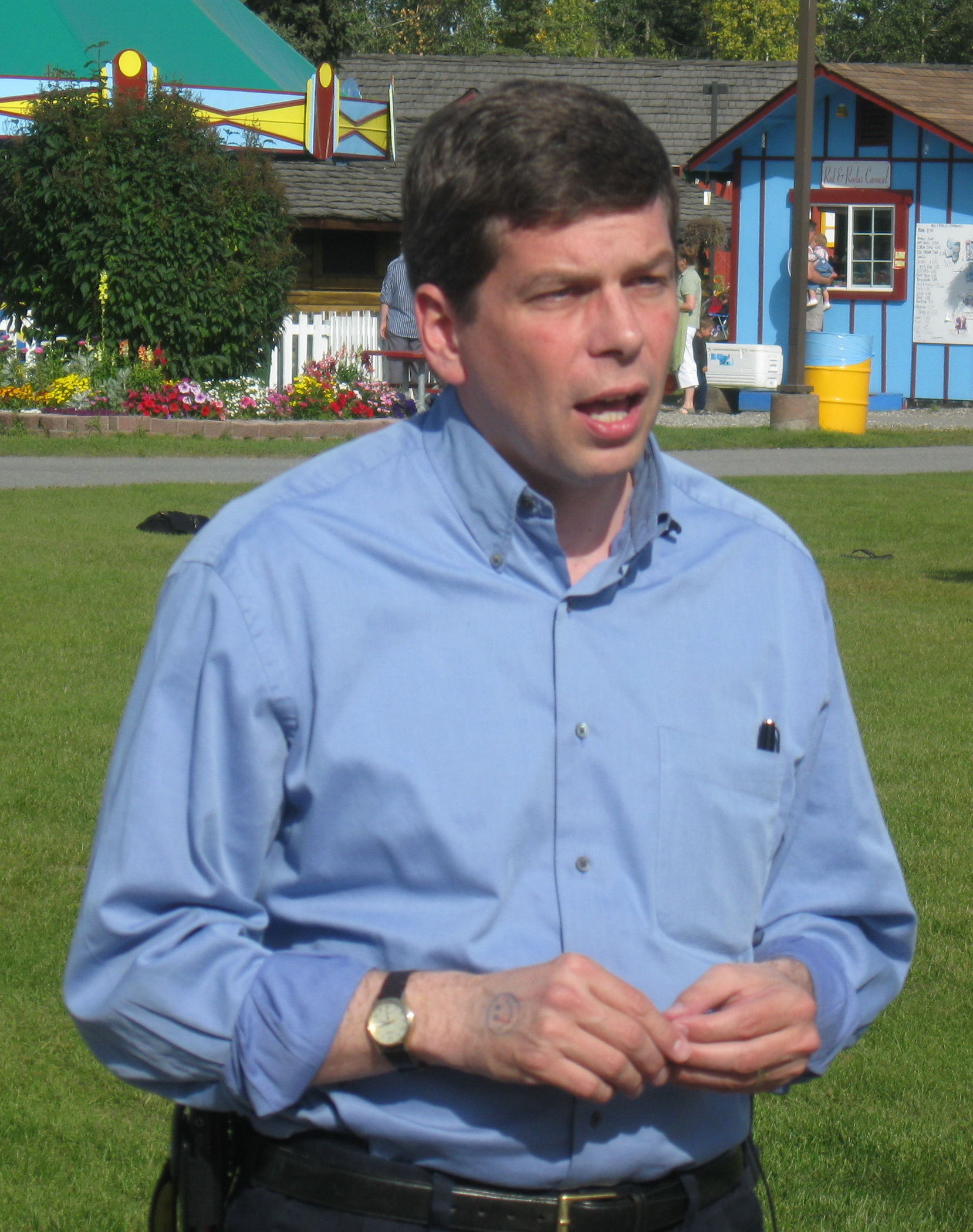
Begich campaigning at Pioneer Park in Fairbanks in September 2008

On February 27, 2008, Begich announced that he was forming an exploratory committee to run for the United States Senate. After winning the Democratic nomination, he went on to face Republican incumbent Ted Stevens in the general election. Begich was ahead in polls prior to the election. During the campaign, Stevens faced a multiple count indictment on ethics and corruption charges.

On October 27, 2008, eight days before the general election, Stevens was found guilty by a Washington D.C. federal jury on seven felony counts.

Stevens's conviction was later set aside due to prosecutorial misconduct. Attorney General Eric Holder later declined to retry Stevens on the corruption charges.

On November 18, 2008, the Associated Press called the election for Begich, who was leading and likely to win by more than the 0.5% margin needed to trigger an automatic recount, with the remainder of uncounted ballots originating from the Anchorage area. Stevens conceded the race the next day.

Begich's victory made him Alaska's first Democratic US Senator since Mike Gravel left office in 1981.

In April 2009, Alaska Republican Party chairman Randy Ruedrich issued a call for Begich to resign so a special election could be held. Despite the fact that the charges had been brought under President George W. Bush, Ruedrich argued that Begich's win was illegitimate because of "improper influence from the corrupt Department of Justice." The same day Governor Sarah Palin seconded Ruedrich's call, although she later denied having said Begich should resign. Begich said he intended to serve his full six-year term.

==== 2014 ====
Begich was up for re-election in 2014. He faced William Bryk in the Democratic primary on August 19, 2014, winning 96.7% of the vote. Candidates in the closed Republican primary included Lieutenant Governor Mead Treadwell, who received 25% of the vote; former Alaska Attorney General and Department of Natural Resources Commissioner Daniel S. Sullivan, who won with 40%; 2010 US Senate nominee Joe Miller (32%); and John Jaramillo (3%). Alaska's 2014 US Senate race was considered one of the most competitive congressional races in the nation, with the Cook Political Report rating it a "toss-up." In the final Rothenberg Political Report before the election, the Report considered the race a "Toss-up/Tilt Republican."

In August 2014, shortly before the Senate primary, Lisa Murkowski, who served alongside Begich in the US Senate, objected to Begich's use of her image in a campaign advertisement titled "Great Team." Murkowski's law firm sent a cease-and-desist letter, calling the advertisement "factually incorrect." According to Politico, "Begich, running in deep-red Alaska, has sought on several occasions to highlight shared positions with Murkowski. But she is distancing herself." Begich declined to pull the ad.

According to The New York Times, Alaska's 2014 US Senate race is "potentially pivotal" and "nationally watched." The New York Times reported that in a bid to keep his seat, "Begich will try to attract rural voters and supporters of abortion rights." According to The Washington Post, Begich is campaigning on the idea of expanding Social Security benefits. According to The Washington Post, "Begich is one of a small but growing group of Democratic lawmakers who support the idea of lifting or changing the payroll tax cap, so higher earners pay more while adopting a new measure for inflation that would increase benefits for all seniors."

In August 2014, Begich pulled a campaign ad accusing opponent Dan Sullivan of allowing an alleged murderer and rapist to get off with a light sentence. That claim was proven to be false by fact-checkers. The ad was withdrawn from Alaska television stations following demands from the crime victim's family that the ads were both insensitive and threatened prosecution of a criminal suspect.

Begich voted against a Republican-sponsored amended in the Senate to strip all funding from President Obama's Deferred Action for Childhood Arrivals program and to prevent the DACA program from being expanded. During the campaign, Sullivan criticized Begich's vote.

On November 17, 2014, Begich conceded the election to Sullivan.

=== Tenure ===
On February 13, 2009, Begich voted to pass the American Recovery and Reinvestment Act of 2009 (commonly referred to as the Stimulus or The Recovery Act).

In 2012, Begich introduced a bill called the Protecting and Preserving Social Security Act. The bill would have lifted the payroll tax cap, raising taxes on those who earn $110,100 or more per year. It did not pass.

According to an analysis by Congressional Quarterly in 2013 Begich voted with President Obama 97% of the time.

In March 2013, Begich co-sponsored a bill that would flag individuals attempting to buy guns who have used an insanity defense, were ruled dangerous by a court or had been committed by a court to mental health treatment. It did not address the gun show loophole. It was not passed into law.

Representative Don Young (R–AK) praised Begich for doing a "great job" representing Alaska.

=== Legislation ===
Begich sponsored 164 bills of his own, including:

==== 111th Congress (2009–2010) ====
- S. 1561–1566, Begich's first bills, each introduced on August 3, 2009, would address a number of issues affecting the Arctic region. S. 1561 would increase coordination among the United States, Russia, Canada, Iceland, Norway, Denmark, and other seafaring and Arctic nations with regard to navigation, monitoring of conditions, and marine pollution in Arctic waters. S.1562 would review and make more efficient scientific research being conducted in the Arctic and would direct the National Oceanic and Atmospheric Administration to develop an observation, monitoring, modeling, and research plan for black carbon and other aerosols. S. 1563 would create a US Ambassador at Large for Arctic Affairs. S. 1564 would increase the studying of, preparation for, and responses to oil spills that occur in the Beaufort and Chukchi Seas. S. 1565 would direct the United States Arctic Research Commission to submit biennial reports to Congress detailing the strategies to deal with health needs specific to populations living in the Arctic. S. 1566 would create a grant program in the Department of Agriculture to aid individuals and organizations in the Arctic in adapting to changes in climate and would fund research detailing the most appropriate responses to changes in Arctic climate. Begich later introduced S. 3580 and S.3584, which are similar to S.1564. S.1563, S.1565, S.3580, and S.3584 were reintroduced in the 112th Congress as S. 1229, S. 1227, S. 203 and S. 204. S. 1563 and S. 1565 were reintroduced in the 113th Congress as S. 270 and S. 271.
- S. 1673, a bill to increase the tax deduction for Alaska Native corporations that make donations to conservation on lands reserved for Alaska Natives, introduced September 15, 2009, reintroduced in the 113th Congress as S. 2636
- S. 2842 and S. 2873, bills to deny the tax deduction for direct-to-consumer expenses for prescription pharmaceuticals advertisers, and to allow for a $500 tax credit for the parents of any child who participates in an organization that promotes physical activity for children, introduced December 7 and 11, 2009
- S. 2852, a bill to support the development of renewable energy sources in the Arctic, introduced December 9, 2009, reintroduced in the 112th Congress as S. 3371, and in the 113th Congress as S. 2705
- S. 3225, a bill to create a competitive grant program in the Department of Commerce, with grants to be awarded to entities that promote domestic regional tourism growth and new domestic tourism market creation, was introduced on March 19, 2010. A modified version of this bill was introduced in the 112th Congress as S. 1663.
- S. 3704, a bill to reform the Federal Housing Administration (FHA) to improve the financial safety and soundness of the FHA mortgage insurance program, was introduced on August 4, 2010. S. 3704's companion bill was passed by the House of Representatives but has not become law.
- S. 3820, a bill to create a competitive grant program, with grants to be awarded to educational institutions that implement and expand effective science, technology, engineering, and mathematics curricula, introduced September 29, 2010, reintroduced in the 112th Congress as S. 463
- S. 3969 and S. 3971, bills to require genetically engineered fish to be labeled as such, and to prohibit the commercial approval of genetically engineered fish, introduced November 18, 2010, reintroduced in the 112th Congress as S. 229 and S. 230

==== 112th Congress (2011–2012) ====
- S. 205, a bill to require post-production oil drilled from Arctic waters to be transported by means of pipelines, to allocate 37.5% of the revenue generated from leasing rights and post-leasing activities to the Alaskan government, of which 20% is to be allocated to coastal political subdivisions, 33% to certain regional corporations, and 7% to Alaska Native Indian tribes, and to allocate 6.25% of federal royalty revenue to a land and water conservation fund and to reducing the federal government's budget deficit, introduced January 26, 2011, reintroduced in the 113th Congress as S. 199
- S. 895, a bill to create a competitive grant program in the Department of Education to award grants to educational institutions that improve the effectiveness of teachers, strengthen the use of data to improve education, provide rigorous standards with high-standard tests aligned with those standards, turn around the lowest-performing schools, and any other thing the Secretary of Education chooses, with at least 25% of funds being allocated to rural education institutions, and to direct the Secretary of Education to create performance measures to track improvements, introduced May 5, 2011, reintroduced in the 113th Congress as S. 283
- S. 1357, a bill to make the Roadless Area Conservation Rule inapplicable to land in Alaska included in the National Forest System, introduced July 13, 2011, reintroduced in the 113th Congress as S. 384
- S. 1691, a bill to allow the interstate sale of firearms if the transaction is in compliance with both states' laws, and to no longer prohibit licensees from conducting business at gun shows outside of the state in which they received their license, introduced on October 12, 2011
- S. 1717, a bill to prohibit genetically engineered salmon from being distributed or sold in interstate and foreign commerce, introduced October 17, 2011
- S. 2180 and S. 2181, bills to create a $3,000 tax credit for early-childhood educators, to include early-childhood educators in the federal loan forgiveness programs for teachers, and to cap the allowable amount of loan forgiveness in these programs for early-childhood educators at $25,000, introduced March 8, 2012, reintroduced in the 113th Congress as S. 438 and S. 440
- S. 2188, a bill to allow individuals with a permit to carry concealed handguns to be able to conceal their handguns in all other states in which equivalent laws exist, introduced March 12, 2012
- S. 3262, a bill to authorize aboriginal whaling if it is used for the purpose of subsistence, is accomplished in an efficient manner, and does not include the hunting of any whale accompanied by a calf, introduced July 5, 2012
- S. 3451, a bill to exempt certain air taxi services from an excise tax imposed on air transportation, introduced July 26, 2012

==== 113th Congress (2013–2014) ====
- S. 282, a bill to award competitive grants to states that implement post-secondary education planning and career guidance programs for students, introduced February 12, 2013
- S. 287, a bill to expand veterans' benefits for homeless veterans, introduced on February 12, 2013
- S. 428, a bill to allow the Army to plan, survey, design, construct, maintain, or operate Arctic deepwater ports in cooperation with developers (which the bill defines), introduced on February 28, 2013
- S. 896, a bill to eliminate the Federal Insurance Contributions Act tax's cap on taxable income, introduced May 8, 2013
- S. 1325, a bill to expand the small business tax credit for health insurance, was introduced on July 18, 2013. A modified version of this bill was later introduced as S. 2069.
- S. 1327, a bill to allow employers to enroll their employees in a health plan in the Federal Employees Health Benefits Program if fewer than two plans are offered in the Small Business Health Options Program and no multi-state plans are available, introduced July 18, 2013
- S. 1729, a bill to create a new "copper" tier of health plans below current "bronze" level plans offered in the PPACA's insurance exchanges, introduced November 19, 2013
- S. 2059, a bill to expand the Nonbusiness Energy Property Tax Credit from a lifetime credit of $1,500 to $5,000 in a single taxable year, introduced February 27, 2014
- S. 2241, a bill to create harsher penalties for individuals who distribute or manufacture drugs in or near schools, recreational areas, swimming pools, and game arcades, introduced April 10, 2014
- S. 2258, a bill to bind the cost-of-living adjustment (COLA) for veterans' disability compensation to the COLA for disability benefits in the Social Security program, introduced April 28, 2014, signed into law September 26, 2014
- S. 2399, a bill to make valid for voting any ID card issued by an Indian Tribe or Native Corporation, and to place restrictions on the elimination, moving, and consolidation of polling locations in Indian reservations, introduced May 22, 2014
- S. 2957, a bill to prohibit Super PACs from making robocalls to individuals who have listed their phone number in the National Do Not Call Registry, introduced November 25, 2014

=== Committee assignments ===
Begich, along with Bill Huizenga, Michigan Congressional representative, and Ron Wyden, Oregon US Senator, visiting military personnel at Kandahar Airfield in January 2012.

- Committee on Appropriations
  - Subcommittee on Homeland Security
  - Subcommittee on Interior, Environment, and Related Agencies
  - Subcommittee on Legislative Branch
  - Subcommittee on Military Construction, Veterans Affairs, and Related Agencies
  - Subcommittee on the Department of State, Foreign Operations, and Related Programs
- Committee on Commerce, Science and Transportation
  - Subcommittee on Aviation Operations, Safety, and Security
  - Subcommittee on Communications, Technology, and the Internet
  - Subcommittee on Competitiveness, Innovation, and Export Promotion
  - Subcommittee on Oceans, Atmosphere, Fisheries, and Coast Guard (chair)
  - Subcommittee on Surface Transportation and Merchant Marine Infrastructure, Safety, and Security
- Committee on Homeland Security and Governmental Affairs
  - Subcommittee on Financial and Contracting Oversight
  - Subcommittee on the Efficiency and Effectiveness of Federal Programs and the Federal Workforce
  - Subcommittee on Emergency Management, Intergovernmental Relations, and the District of Columbia (chair)
- Committee on Indian Affairs
- Committee on Veterans' Affairs

=== Caucus memberships ===
- Senate Oceans Caucus

== Gubernatorial bid ==
On June 1, 2018, Begich announced his candidacy for the Democratic nomination for Governor of Alaska in the 2018 election, facing off against Republican nominee and former state senator Mike Dunleavy. He lost the gubernatorial election by a margin of seven percentage points.

== Political positions ==
=== Abortion ===
Begich is pro-choice and opposes restrictions on late-term abortions. He has received a 100% rating from the pro-choice organization NARAL and a 0% rating from the anti-abortion organization NRLC.

=== Cannabis ===
Begich stated that he had concerns but would defend Ballot Measure 2 (Alaska Marijuana Legalization).

=== Capital punishment ===
Begich stated that he generally opposes the death penalty.

=== Domestic security ===
Begich supports repealing the Patriot Act and opposes "allowing the government to conduct surveillance wiretaps without warrants."

=== Energy ===
In 2008, Begich supported the creation of a national cap-and-trade system for controlling greenhouse gas emissions. In 2010, he signed a letter advocating the establishment of a 'price' for greenhouse gas emissions as part of national energy policy. Begich has stated that this should not be interpreted as support for a carbon tax.

Begich supports drilling for oil in the Arctic National Wildlife Refuge.

=== Environment ===
Begich believes that human activity is a major factor contributing to climate change.

=== Gun rights ===
In 2014, Begich had a 79% (A−) rating with the NRA Political Victory Fund.

=== Healthcare ===
Begich voted for the Affordable Care Act (also known as Obamacare) when the bill first passed Congress. Begich has not said whether or not he would vote for the bill again.

=== Israel ===
Begich is a supporter of Israel and is part of the advisory committee of the pro-Israel group American Israel Public Affairs Committee.

=== Labor ===
Begich supports raising minimum wage and extending unemployment benefits beyond 26 weeks.

=== Same-sex marriage ===
Begich supports same-sex marriage.

=== Veterans' affairs ===
On April 28, 2014, Begich introduced the Veterans' Compensation Cost-of-Living Adjustment Act of 2014 (S. 2258; 113th Congress), a bill that would, beginning on December 1, 2014, increase the rates of veterans' disability compensation, additional compensation for dependents, the clothing allowance for certain disabled veterans, and dependency and indemnity compensation for surviving spouses and children.

== Personal life ==
Begich is married to Deborah Bonito, a former chair of the Alaska Democratic Party and the owner of several small businesses throughout Anchorage. They have a son, Jacob. Begich is Catholic.

During his term in the Senate, Begich was the only US Senator without a college degree. He has taken continuing education classes at the University of Alaska Anchorage. His brother Nick Jr. has researched and written about the High-frequency Active Auroral Research Program (HAARP) as an instrument of weather modification and allegedly mind control. His nephew, Nick Begich III, was elected to the US House of Representatives from Alaska's at-large congressional district in 2024 as a Republican. Mark's brother Tom Begich was elected as a state senator from Anchorage in 2016 but declined to file for reelection in 2022.

Begich currently serves as a lobbyist with Brownstein Hyatt Farber Schreck.

== Electoral history ==
=== Anchorage Assembly ===
1988 Anchorage Assembly Seat H October 4, 1988
Party	Candidate	Votes	%
Nonpartisan	Mark Begich	2,264	35.0
Nonpartisan	Steven Fowler	1,914	29.5
Nonpartisan	Dave Harbour	1,171	18.0
Nonpartisan	Liz Vazquez	586	9.0
Nonpartisan	Dorothy Cox	293	4.5
Nonpartisan	Walt Wood	129	1.9
Nonpartisan	Mike L. Heggenberger	44	0.6
Nonpartisan	Nick Rodes	42	0.6
Write-in	Write-in	26	0.4
Total votes		6,469	

1991 Anchorage Assembly Seat H October 1, 1991
Party	Candidate	Votes	%
Nonpartisan	Mark Begich (incumbent)	5,216	55.06
Nonpartisan	Eddie Burke	4,170	44.02
Write-in	Write-in	88	0.93
Total votes		9,474	

1995 Anchorage Assembly Seat H April 18, 1995
Party	Candidate	Votes	%
Nonpartisan	Mark Begich (incumbent)	4,657	51.06
Nonpartisan	Steven R. Fowler	3,735	40.95
Nonpartisan	Edward Robbins	470	5.15
Write-in	Write-in	118	1.29
Total votes		8,980	

=== Anchorage Mayor ===
1994 Anchorage Mayor May 2, 1994
Candidate	Votes	%
Rick Mystrom	15,049	21.78
Mark Begich	13,533	19.58
Craig Campbell	12,018	17.39
Jim Kubitz	7,594	10.99
Heather Flynn	6,896	9.98
Dr. Joyce Murphy	6,181	8.94
Virginia Collins	4,260	6.16
Pat Parnell	2,314	3.35
Mike John O'Callaghan	547	0.79
Richard "Ziggy" Ziegler	271	0.39
Michael J. P. DeFermo	134	0.19
Tom Staudenmaier	107	0.15
Matthew P. Gill	62	0.09
Charles E. McKee	58	0.08
Write-ins	84	0.12
Turnout	69,108	49.52%

1994 Anchorage Mayor Runoff May 17, 1994
Candidate	Votes	%
Rick Mystrom	29,546	58.40
Mark Begich	21,046	41.60
Total votes	50,592	

2000 Anchorage Mayor April 4, 2000
Candidate	Votes	%
Mark Begich	24,920	40.26
George Wuerch	12,681	20.49
Jack Frost	11,396	18.41
Bob Bell	6,034	9.75
Dave Donely	2,744	4.43
Pete Kott	2,289	3.70
Theresa Nangle Obermeyer, Phd	1,178	1.90
John Kehr, Jr.	90	0.15
Race G. Jones	74	0.12
Write-ins	91	0.15
Total votes	61,497	
Turnout		30.94%

2000 Anchorage Mayor Runoff May 2, 2000
Candidate	Votes	%
George Wuerch	32,167	52.49
Mark Begich	20,116	47.51
Total votes	69,025	
Turnout		35.63%

2003 Anchorage Mayor April 1, 2003
Candidate	Votes	%
Mark Begich	28,604	45.03
George Wuerch (incumbent)	23,615	37.17
Richard Mystrom	9,954	15.67
David Dunsmore	488	0.77
Jennifer Citti	195	0.31
Thomas Mark Higgins	144	0.23
Richard Zeigler	135	0.21
Tom Layne	103	0.16
Daniel DeNardo	97	0.15
Ray Malcolm	61	0.1
Bruce J. Lemke	49	0.08
Write-in	79	0.12
Total votes	63,524	
Turnout		34.45%

2006 Anchorage Mayor April 4, 2006
Candidate	Votes	%
Mark Begich (incumbent)	39,468	55.95
Jack Frost	28,760	40.77
Nick Moe	1,747	2.48
Thomas Mark Higgins	431	431
Write-in	135	0.19
Total votes	70,541	
Turnout		35.02%

=== US Senate ===
2008 Alaska US Senate Democratic primary election
Party	Candidate	Votes	%	±%
Democratic	Mark Begich	63,747	90.82	
Democratic	Ray Metcalfe	5,480	7.81	
Democratic	Frank Vondersaar	965	1.37	
Turnout		70,192		

2008 United States Senate election in Alaska
Party	Candidate	Votes	%	±%
Democratic	Mark Begich	151,767	47.77	+37.26
Republican	Ted Stevens (inc.)	147,814	46.52	−31.65
Independence	Bob Bird	13,197	4.15	+1.22
Libertarian	David Haase	2,483	0.78	−0.25
Independent	Ted Gianoutsos	1,385	0.44	
Write-In		1,077	0.34	+0.21
Majority		3,953	1.24	−66.41
Turnout		317,723		

2014 Alaska US Senate Democratic primary election
Party	Candidate	Votes	%	±%
Democratic	Mark Begich (inc.)	58,092	96.63	
Democratic	William Bryk	2,024	3.37	
Turnout		60,116		

2014 United States Senate election in Alaska
Party	Candidate	Votes	%	±%
Republican	Dan Sullivan	135,445	47.96	+1.46
Democratic	Mark Begich (inc.)	129,431	45.83	−1.94
Libertarian	Mark Fish	10,512	3.72	+1.94
Independent	Ted Gianoutsos	5,636	2	+1.56
Write-ins	Others	1,376	0.49	+0.15
Plurality		6,014	2.13	
Turnout		282,400	55.48	

=== Alaska Governor ===
2018 Alaska Gubernatorial Primary
Party	Candidate	Votes	%	±%
Democratic	Mark Begich	29,806	85.15	
Libertarian	William S. Toien	5,197	14.85	

2018 Alaska gubernatorial/lieutenant gubernatorial election
Party	Candidate	Votes	%	±%
Republican	Mike Dunleavy and Kevin Meyer	145,631	51.44%	+5.56%
Democratic	Mark Begich and Debra Call	125,739	44.41%	N/A
Independent	Bill Walker (inc.) and Valerie Davidson (inc.) withdrawn	5,757	2.03%	−46.07%
Libertarian	William Toien and Carolyn Clift	5,402	1.91%	−1.30%
Write-in	Write-ins	605	0.21%	−0.11%
Total votes		283,134	100.0%	N/A

Political offices
Preceded by George Wuerch	Mayor of Anchorage; 2003–2009	Succeeded by Matt Claman
Party political offices
Preceded by Frank Vondersaar	Democratic nominee for U.S. Senator from Alaska (Class 2); 2008, 2014	Succeeded by Al Gross; Endorsed
Preceded by Debbie Stabenow	Chair of the Senate Democratic Steering and Outreach Committee; 2011–2015	Succeeded by Amy Klobuchar
Preceded by Bill Walker; Endorsed	Democratic nominee for Governor of Alaska; 2018	Succeeded by Les Gara
U.S. Senate
Preceded by Ted Stevens	U.S. Senator (Class 2) from Alaska; 2009–2015; Served alongside: Lisa Murkowski	Succeeded by Dan Sullivan
U.S. order of precedence (ceremonial)
Preceded by Kyrsten Sinema as Former U.S. Senator	Order of precedence of the United States	Succeeded by Ted Kaufman as Former U.S. Senator
