= Write-in candidate =

Political term

A write-in candidate is a candidate whose name does not appear on the ballot but seeks election by asking voters to cast a vote for the candidate by physically writing in the person's name on the ballot. Depending on electoral law it may be possible to win an election by winning a sufficient number of such write-in votes, which count equally as if the person were formally listed on the ballot.

Writing in a name that is not already on the election ballot is a permitted practice in the United States. Some other jurisdictions have also allowed this practice. In the United States, there are variations in laws governing write-in candidates, depending on the office (federal or local) and whether the election is a primary election or the general election; general practice is an empty field close by annotated to explain its purpose on the ballot if it applies. In five U.S. states there are no elections to which it can apply, under their present laws. Election laws are enacted by each state and in the District of Columbia, to apply to their voters.

== Writing in the name ==
Some U.S. states and local jurisdictions allow a voter to affix a sticker, with the write-in candidate's name, to the ballot in lieu of actually writing in the candidate's name.

Write-in candidacies are sometimes a result of a candidate being legally or procedurally ineligible to run under their own name or party; write-in candidacies may be permitted where term limits bar an incumbent candidate from being officially nominated for, or being listed on the ballot for, re-election. They are also typically used when a candidate, often an incumbent, has lost a primary election but still wishes to contest the general election, as in most U.S. a candidate who has lost a primary cannot later appear on the general election ballot as an independent candidate under sore loser laws.

In some cases, write-in campaigns have been organized to support a candidate who is not personally involved in running; this may be a form of draft campaign.

== Registration of write-in candidates ==
Write-in candidates have won elections on rare occasions. Also, write-in votes are sometimes cast for ineligible people or fictional characters, often as a form of protest vote.

Some jurisdictions require write-in candidates be registered as official candidates before the election. This is standard in elections with a large pool of potential candidates, as there may be multiple candidates with the same name that could be written in.

== The spoiler effect ==
In some cases, the number of write-in votes cast in an election is greater than the entire margin of victory, suggesting that the write-ins may have been sufficient to tip the balance and change the outcome of the election by creating a spoiler effect.

== Primary elections in the United States ==
Many U.S. states and municipalities allow for write-in votes in a partisan primary election where no candidate is listed on the ballot to have the same functional effect as nominating petitions: for example, if there are no Reform Party members on the ballot for state general assembly and a candidate receives more than 200 write-in votes when the primary election is held (or the other number of signatures that were required for ballot access), the candidate will be placed on the ballot on that ballot line for the general election. In most places, this provision is in place for non-partisan elections as well.

== Write-in option in a referendum ==
A write-in option may occasionally be available in a multiple-choice referendum; for example in the January 1982 Guamanian status referendum.

== Contrast from a blank ballot election system ==
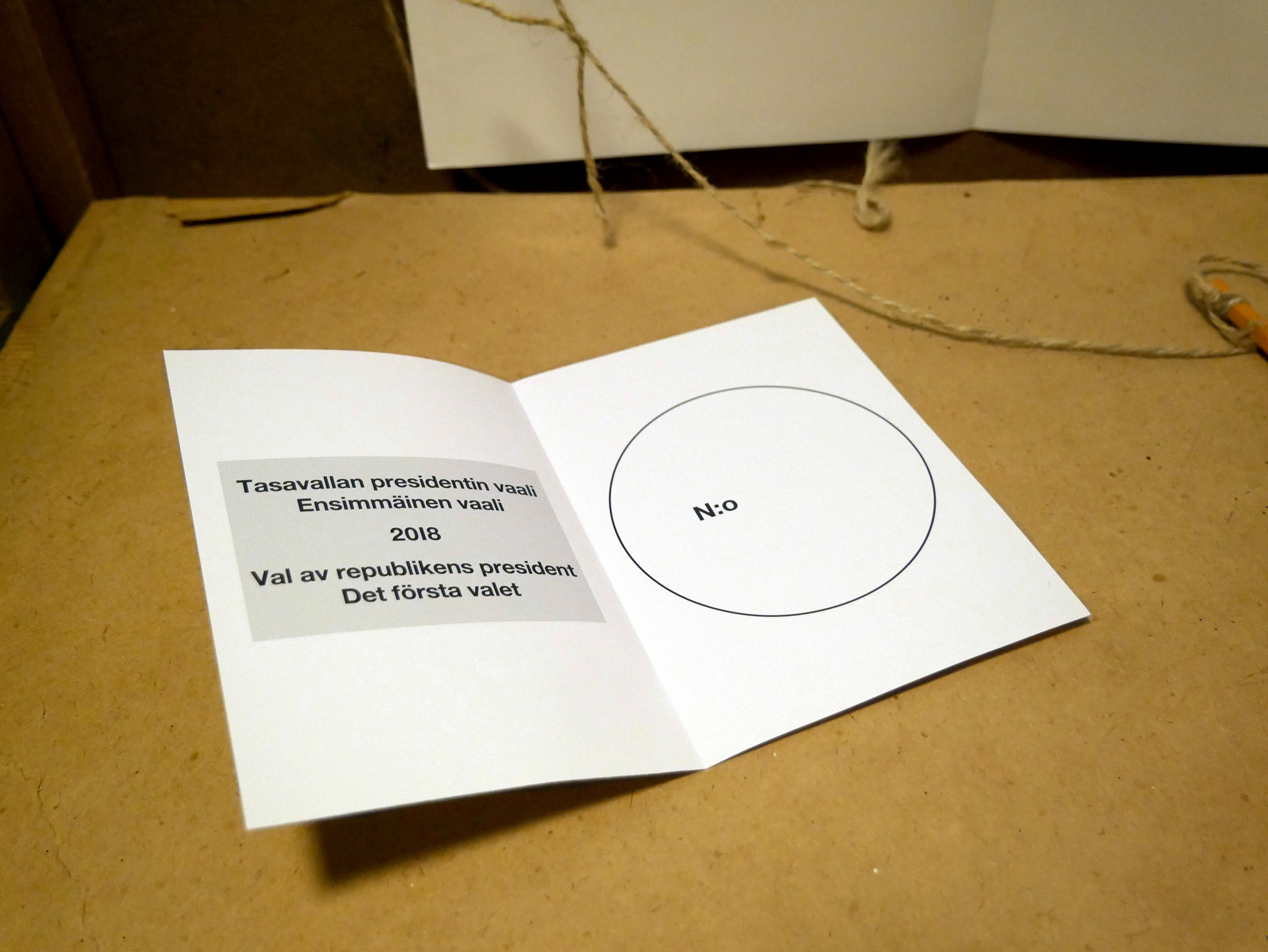
2018 Finnish presidential election ballot

The term "write-in candidate" is used in elections in which names of candidates or parties are preprinted on a paper ballot or displayed on an electronic voting machine. The term is not generally used in elections in which all ballots are blank and thus all voters must write in the names of their preferred candidates. Blank ballot election systems reduce the cost of printing the ballots, but increase the complexity of casting and counting votes.

Such systems are used in Japan, and were used in the past in the French Second Republic and in elections in the Philippines from World War II until the 2010 general election. Unusually, this system was also used in Canada for the 2025 Battle River—Crowfoot federal by-election, due to over 200 candidates having been nominated; the election had been targeted by the Longest Ballot Committee, whose previous efforts had resulted in unwieldy preprinted ballots with as many as 91 candidates.

Some systems use a semi-blank ballot, such as Finland, where the voter must fill in a candidate's given number or letter from a separate ballot, but where there is a clear-cut arrangement with a circle or box with a description of how to vote for a given candidate. Blank-ballot systems typically require candidates to be nominated in advance.

== United States ==
Requirements for write-in candidates in the 2024 United States general election: Registration not required; Registration required; Write-in not allowed for president, registration required for other offices; Write-in only allowed for substitutes; Write-in not allowed

The requirements to appear on the general election ballot as an independent candidate or to have write-in votes counted vary by state and by political office sought.

As of 2024, 40 states and the District of Columbia allow write-in votes on their ballots, including for president; Alaska, New Mexico and South Carolina allow write-in candidates for some offices but not for president; Mississippi allows write-in votes only to substitute a candidate listed on the ballot who was removed, withdrew or died; Arkansas, Hawaii, Louisiana, Nevada, Oklahoma and South Dakota do not allow any write-in votes. Most of the jurisdictions allowing write-in votes require that the write-in candidates register by a certain date for their votes to be counted. Typically this registration consists only of a declaration of candidacy, but some states also require signatures of a certain number of voters, additional paperwork or fees. The deadline to register as a write-in candidate is usually later than to petition to be listed on the ballot.

=== 2024 presidential general election ===
Requirements for independent candidates for president in the 2024 United States general election
State or district	Petition to be listed on ballot			Registration as write-in candidate			Sources
State or district	signatures	fee	deadline	signatures	fee	deadline	Sources
Alabama	5,000	—	August 15	Registration not required			
Alaska	3,614	—	August 7	Write-in not allowed for president			
Arizona	42,303	—	August 17	—	—	September 26	
Arkansas	5,000	—	August 5	Write-in not allowed			
California	219,403	—	August 9	—	—	October 22	
Colorado	12,000 (Note: Including at least 1,500 from each congressional district.)	—	July 11	—	—	July 18	
Connecticut	7,500	—	August 7 (Note: July 31 if submitted to the Secretary of the State, or August 7 if submitted to town clerks.)	—	—	October 7	
Delaware	7,690 (Note: 1% of 768,978 registered voters as of December 31, 2023, rounded up to the next integer.)	—	September 3	—	—	September 20	
District of Columbia	4,573	—	August 7	—	—	November 12	
Florida	145,040	—	July 15	—	—	July 2	
Georgia	7,500	—	June 21 (Note: Deadline to file list of candidates for presidential electors. Additional forms are required at later dates.)	—	—	September 3 (Note: Deadline to file notice of candidacy. An additional form is required at a later date.)	
Hawaii	5,798	—	August 7	Write-in not allowed			
Idaho	1,000	—	March 15	—	—	September 6	
Illinois	25,000	—	June 24	—	—	September 5	
Indiana	36,943	—	July 1	—	—	July 3	
Iowa	3,500 (Note: Including at least 100 from each of 19 counties.)	—	August 24	Registration not required			
Kansas	5,000	—	August 5	—	$20	October 14	
Kentucky	5,000	$500	September 6	—	$50	October 25	
Louisiana (Note: Candidates qualify by providing either the signatures or the fee.)	5,000 (Note: Including at least 500 from each congressional district.)	—	July 24	Write-in not allowed			
Louisiana	—	$500	August 23	Write-in not allowed			
Maine	4,000	—	July 25	—	—	August 27	
Maryland	10,000	—	July 1	—	—	October 17 (Note: Or 7 days after the candidate's campaign spends more than $51, whichever occurs first.)	
Massachusetts	10,000	—	July 30	—	—	September 6	
Michigan	12,000 (Note: Including at least 100 from each of half of congressional districts.)	—	July 18	—	—	August 31	
Minnesota	2,000	—	August 20	—	—	October 29	
Mississippi	1,000	$2,500	September 6	Write-in only allowed for substitutes			
Missouri	10,000	—	July 29	—	—	October 25	
Montana	5,000	$1,740 (Note: Not required if the candidate is unable to pay.)	August 14	—	$1,740	September 10	
Nebraska	2,500	—	August 1	—	—	October 25	
Nevada	10,096 (Note: 1% of 1,009,503 votes for U.S. representatives in the 2022 general election, rounded up to the next integer.)	$250	August 9	Write-in not allowed			
New Hampshire	3,000 (Note: Including at least 1,500 from each congressional district.)	$250	August 7	Registration not required			
New Jersey	800	—	July 29	Registration not required			
New Mexico	3,561	—	June 27	Write-in not allowed for president			
New York	45,000 (Note: Including at least 500 from each of half of congressional districts.)	—	May 28	—	—	October 15	
North Carolina	83,188 (Note: Including at least 200 from each of three congressional districts.)	—	March 5	500	—	July 23 (Note: Deadline to file signatures with county boards of elections. They must also be filed with the state board of elections at a later date.)	
North Dakota	4,000	—	September 3	—	—	October 15	
Ohio	5,000	—	August 7	—	—	August 26	
Oklahoma	34,599	—	July 15	Write-in not allowed			
Oklahoma	—	$35,000	July 15	Write-in not allowed			
Oregon	23,744 (Note: Or 1,000 in an assembly in one place and time.)	—	August 13	Registration not required			
Pennsylvania	5,000	$200	August 1	Registration not required			
Rhode Island	1,000	—	June 26	Registration not required			
South Carolina	10,000	—	July 15	Write-in not allowed for president			
South Dakota	3,502	—	August 6	Write-in not allowed			
Tennessee	275	—	August 15	—	—	September 18	
Texas	113,151	—	May 13	—	—	August 19	
Utah	1,000	$500	June 18	—	$500	September 3	
Vermont	1,000	—	August 1	Registration not required			
Virginia	5,000 (Note: Including at least 200 from each congressional district.)	—	August 23	—	—	October 28	
Washington	1,000	—	July 17 (Note: Deadline to publish notice of convention. Additional forms are required at later dates.)	—	—	November 5	
West Virginia	7,947	$2,500	August 1	—	—	September 17	
Wisconsin	2,000	—	August 6	—	—	October 22	
Wyoming	3,891	$750	August 26	Registration not required			

=== Presidential primary ===
- In the 1960 presidential elections, both major party candidates won a few primaries as write-in candidates, in contests that did not feature any candidates named on the ballot. John F. Kennedy won the Democratic primaries as a write-in candidate in Illinois (with 34,332 votes), Massachusetts (with 91,607 votes), and Pennsylvania (with 183,073 votes). Richard Nixon won the Republican primaries as a write-in candidate in Massachusetts (with 53,164 votes) and in Nebraska (with 74,356 votes). Kennedy also received write-in votes in the Republican primaries in New Hampshire (2,196 votes, which were 3.0% of votes cast), Massachusetts (2,989 votes, which were 4.8% of votes cast), Pennsylvania (3,886 votes, which were 0.4% of votes cast), and Oregon (2,864 votes, which were 1.3% of votes cast).
- In the 1964 Republican presidential primary, a write-in campaign organized by supporters of former U.S. Senator and vice presidential nominee Henry Cabot Lodge, Jr. won the Republican primaries for president in New Hampshire defeating the frontrunner candidate Barry Goldwater. Lodge also won the Republican presidential primaries in New Jersey as a write-in candidate, as the primaries (for both the Democratic and Republican parties) featured no candidates, with all votes cast requiring candidates' names be written-in (Lodge also received a handful of votes in the Democratic primary).
- In the 1968 Democratic presidential primary in New Hampshire, incumbent President Lyndon Johnson did not file, but agreed to have his supporters mount a write-in campaign on his behalf. His write-in campaign received 48% of the votes. Senator Eugene McCarthy, who campaigned actively against Johnson's Vietnam War policies, was on the ballot and received 42% of the vote. McCarthy's strong showing led Johnson to withdraw from the race two and a half weeks later.
- In the 1992 Democratic presidential primary and the 1992 Republican presidential primary, consumer advocate Ralph Nader ran a write-in campaign during the New Hampshire primary for the presidential nomination of both parties. Declaring himself the "none of the above candidate" and using his Concord Principles as his platform, Nader received 3,054 votes from Democrats and 3,258 votes from Republicans.
- In the 2024 New Hampshire Democratic presidential primary, incumbent president Joe Biden received 79,100 write-in votes, more than any listed candidate. Biden did not run in the primary because of a dispute between the Democratic National Committee and the New Hampshire Democratic Party regarding the scheduling of that year's Democratic presidential primary. Biden did not support the write-in effort mounted by his supporters.

=== U.S. Senate ===
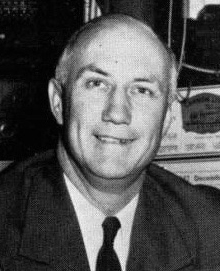
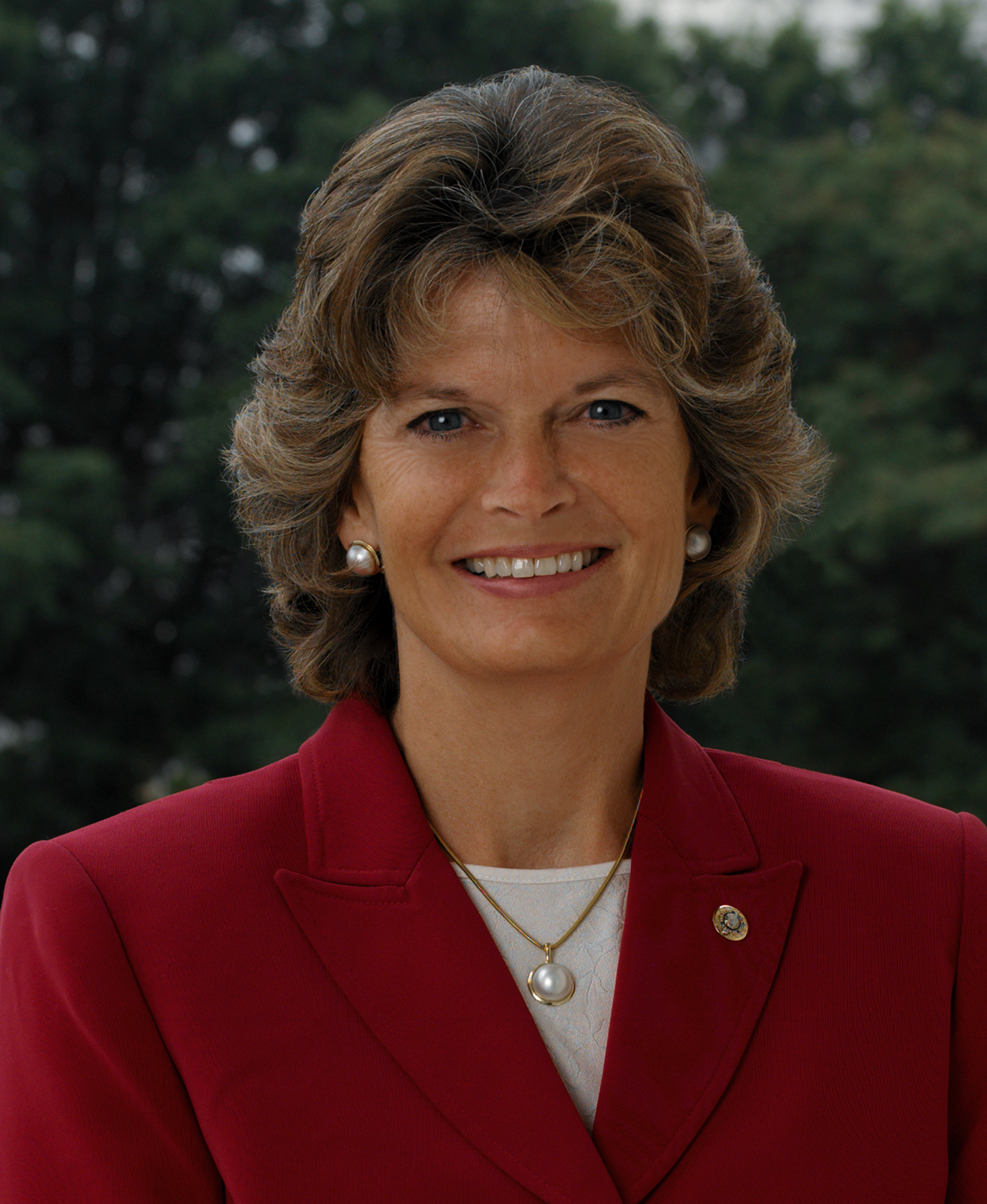
Strom Thurmond (South Carolina, 1954) and Lisa Murkowski (Alaska, 2010) are the only U.S. Senate candidates to win an election via write-in and defeat candidates with ballot access.
- Republican William Knowland was elected in 1946 to the U.S. Senate from California, for a two-month term. The special election for the two-month term featured a November ballot with no names printed on it, and all candidates in that special election were write-in candidates.
- Democrat Strom Thurmond was elected in 1954 to the United States Senate in South Carolina as a write-in candidate, after state Democratic leaders had blocked him from receiving the party's nomination.
- In 2010 incumbent Alaska Senator Lisa Murkowski lost the Republican primary to Joe Miller. Following her defeat she ran in the general election as a write-in candidate. Murkowski had filed, and won, a lawsuit requiring election officials to have the list of names of write-in candidates distributed at the polls, and subsequently won the election with a wide enough margin over both Miller, and Democratic Party candidate Scott T. McAdams, to make moot the write-in ballots that had been challenged by Miller.
- In 2020, Chris Janicek won the Democratic Senatorial nomination, but during the campaign he sent out sexually inappropriate text messages to staffers causing the Nebraska Democratic Party to withdraw its support from him. The Nebraska Democratic Party attempted to replace Janicek with Alisha Shelton, but Janicek refused to drop out preventing the replacement. Preston Love Jr. later launched a write-in senatorial campaign and received the support of the Nebraska Democratic Party, making him the first black person to receive the support of a major party for a United States Senate seat in Nebraska. Both Janicek and Love lost to Republican incumbent Ben Sasse.
- In 2026, Catherine Fleming Bruce ran as a write-in candidate for the US Senate in South Carolina, but lost to Democrat challenger Annie Andrews.

=== U.S. House of Representatives ===
- In 1918, Peter F. Tague was elected to the U.S. House as a write-in independent Democrat, defeating the Democratic nominee, John F. Fitzgerald.
- In 1930 Republican Charles F. Curry Jr. was elected to the House as a write-in from Sacramento, California. His father, Congressman Charles F. Curry Sr., would have been listed on the ballot unopposed but, due to his untimely death, his name was removed and no candidate's name was listed on the ballot.
- In 1958, Democrat Dale Alford was elected as a write-in candidate to the United States House of Representatives in Arkansas. As a member of the Little Rock school board, Alford launched his write-in campaign a week before the election because the incumbent, Brooks Hays, was involved in the incident in which president Eisenhower sent federal troops to enforce racial integration at Little Rock Central High School. Racial integration was unpopular at the time, and Alford won by approximately 1,200 votes, a 2% margin.
- In 1964 Democrat Gale Schisler was nominated for Congress in Illinois as a write-in candidate when no Democrat filed to run in the primary election. He defeated incumbent Robert McLoskey in the November general election.
- In November 1980, Republican Joe Skeen was elected to Congress in New Mexico as a write-in candidate, because of a spoiler candidate who also happened to be a write-in. No Republican had filed to run against the incumbent Democrat, Harold L. Runnels, before the close of filing. Runnels died on August 5, 1980, and the Democrats requested a special primary to pick a replacement candidate. The New Mexico Secretary of State allowed the Democrats to have a special primary, but did not allow the Republicans to have a special primary, because they had already gone with no candidate. So Skeen ran as a write-in candidate. After Runnels' widow lost the Democratic special primary, she launched her own write-in candidacy, which split the Democratic vote, taking enough votes from the Democratic nominee to give the election to the Republican, Skeen, who won with a 38% plurality.
- Ron Packard of California finished in second place in the 18-candidate Republican primary to replace the retiring Clair Burgener. Packard lost the primary by 92 votes in 1982, and then mounted a write-in campaign as an independent. He won the election with a 37% plurality against both a Republican and a Democratic candidate. Following the elections, he re-aligned himself as a Republican.
- Democrat Charlie Wilson was the endorsed candidate of the Democratic Party for Ohio's 6th congressional district in Ohio to replace Ted Strickland in 2006. Strickland was running for Governor, and had to give up his congressional seat. Wilson, though, did not qualify for the ballot because only 46 of the 96 signatures on his candidacy petition were deemed valid, while 50 valid signatures were required for ballot placement. The Democratic Party continued to support Wilson, and an expensive primary campaign ensued – over $1 million was spent by both parties. Wilson overwhelmingly won the Democratic primary as a write-in candidate on May 2, 2006, against two Democratic candidates whose names were on the ballot, with Wilson collecting 44,367 votes, 67% of the Democratic votes cast. Wilson faced Republican Chuck Blasdel in the general election on November 7, 2006, and won, receiving 61% of the votes.
- Democrat Dave Loebsack won the 2006 Democratic primary in Iowa's 2nd congressional district as a write-in candidate with 501 votes, since no other candidate ran against him in the primary. He went on to win in the general election against 15-term incumbent Jim Leach by a 51% to 49% margin.
- Jerry McNerney ran as a write-in candidate in the March 2004 Democratic Primary in California's 11th congressional district. He received 1,667 votes (3% of the votes cast), and, having no opposition (no candidates were listed on the Democratic primary ballot), won the primary. Although he lost the November 2004 general election to Republican Richard Pombo, McNerney ran again in 2006 (as a candidate listed on the ballot) and won the Democratic Primary in June, and then the rematch against Pombo in November.
- Shelley Sekula-Gibbs failed as a write-in candidate in the November 7, 2006, election to represent the 22nd Texas congressional district in the 110th Congress (for the full term commencing January 3, 2007). The seat had been vacant since June 9, 2006, due to the resignation of the then representative Tom DeLay. Therefore, on the same ballot, there were two races: one for the 110th Congress, as well as a race for the unexpired portion of the term during the 109th Congress (until January 3, 2007). Sekula-Gibbs won the race for the unexpired portion of the term during the 109th Congress as a candidate listed on the ballot. She could not be listed on the ballot for the full term because Texas law did not allow a replacement candidate to be listed on the ballot after the winner of the primary (Tom DeLay) has resigned.
- Peter Welch, a Democrat representing Vermont's sole congressional district, became both the Democratic and Republican nominee for the House when he ran for re-election in 2008 and 2016. Because the Republicans did not field any candidate on the primary ballot in those elections, Welch won enough write-in votes to win the Republican nomination.

=== State legislatures ===
- Several members of the Alaska House of Representatives were elected as write-in candidates during the 1960s and 1970s, particularly from rural districts in the northern and western portions of the state. Factors in play at the time include the newness of Alaska as a state and the previous absence of electoral politics in many of the rural communities, creating an environment which made it hard to attract candidates to file for office during the official filing period. Most of the areas in question were largely populated by Alaska natives, who held little political power in Alaska at the time. This only began to change following the formation of the Alaska Federation of Natives and the passage of the Alaska Native Claims Settlement Act. Known examples of successful write-in candidates include Kenneth A. Garrison and Father Segundo Llorente (1960), Frank R. Ferguson (1972), James H. "Jimmy" Huntington (1974), and Nels A. Anderson Jr. (1976). The incumbent in Llorente's election, Axel C. Johnson, ran for re-election as a write-in candidate after failing to formally file his candidacy paperwork. Johnson and Llorente, as write-in candidates, both outpolled the one candidate who did appear on the ballot. Ferguson and Anderson were both incumbents who launched their write-in campaigns after being defeated in the primary election. Anderson's main opponent, Joseph McGill, had himself won election to the House in 1970 against a write-in candidate by only five votes.
- Carl Hawkinson of Galesburg, Illinois won the Republican primary for the Illinois Senate from Illinois's 47th District in 1986 as a write-in candidate. He went on to be elected in the general election and served until 2003. Hawkinson defeated another write-in, David Leitch, in the primary. Incumbent State Senator Prescott Bloom died in a home fire after the filing date for the primary had passed.
- Arizona state senator Don Shooter won the 2010 primary as a write-in and went on to win the general election.
- After failing to receive the Republican Party's 1990 Wilson Pakula nomination, incumbent and registered Conservative New York State Senator Serphin R. Maltese won the party's nomination as a write-in candidate.
- Charlotte Burks won as a Democratic write-in candidate for the Tennessee Senate seat left vacant when the incumbent, her husband Tommy, was assassinated by his opponent, Byron Looper, two weeks before the elections of November 2, 1998. The assassin was the only name on the ballot, so Charlotte ran as a write-in candidate.
- Winnie Brinks was elected to the Michigan House of Representatives in 2012 after a series of unusual events. In May of that year, State Representative Roy Schmidt – who had previously filed to run for re-election as a Democrat – withdrew from the Democratic primary and re-filed as a Republican. A friend of Schmidt's nephew filed to run as a Democrat, but withdrew two days later amid anger among local Democrats. This left Democrats without a candidate. Brinks ran as a write-in to be the Democratic nominee. She won the primary and was listed on the ballot in the general election, which she also won. Coincidentally, the general election also saw a write-in candidate, Bing Goei, receive significant support.
- Scott Wagner was elected as an anti-establishment Republican write-in candidate to the Pennsylvania Senate in a March 2014 special election over endorsed Republican nominee Ron Miller and Democrat Linda Small.
- Nick Freitas was re-elected in 2019 as a write-in candidate after missing a filing deadline to appear on the ballot in the Virginia House of Delegates.
- In November 2024, Scott Madon won the election as a write-in candidate for the Kentucky Senate. The incumbent senator, Johnnie Turner, died two weeks before the election. Madon was one of 11 write-in candidates who ran to replace the late Turner, and he won with more the double the votes of his nearest rival.

=== Local government ===
- Greg Hribal ran as a write-in candidate for village president/mayor of the Village of Westchester in Illinois in April 2023, challenging the five balloted candidates after announcing his intentions 60 days before the election. Greg Hribal took the seat with 26.44% of the votes winning the election with 939 votes over second place Kevin McDermott, who obtained 685 votes.
- Angela Allen was elected mayor of Tar Heel, North Carolina (population 115), as a write-in candidate in 2003.
- Julia Allen of Readington, New Jersey, won a write-in campaign in the November 2005 elections for the Township Committee, after a candidate accused of corruption had won the primary.
- Tom Ammiano, President of the San Francisco Board of Supervisors, entered the race for mayor of San Francisco as a write-in candidate two weeks before the 1999 general election. He received 25% of the vote, coming in second place and forcing incumbent Mayor Willie Brown into a runoff election, which Brown won by margin of 59% to 40%. In 2001, the campaign was immortalized in the award-winning documentary film See How They Run.
- John R. Brinkley ran as a write-in candidate for governor of Kansas in 1930. He was motivated at least in part by the state's revocation of his medical license and attempts to shut down his clinic, where he performed alternative medical procedures including transplantation of goat glands into humans. He won 29.5% of the vote in a three-way race. Brinkley's medical and political career are documented in Pope Brock's book Charlatan. Some additional votes were removed because they were not spelled correctly.
- Mike Duggan filed petition to run for mayor of Detroit in 2013; however, following a court challenge, Duggan's name was removed from the ballot. Duggan then campaigned as a write-in in the August 2013 primary, with the intent of being one of the top two vote-getters and thus advancing to the general election in November. Duggan received the highest number of votes in the primary, and advanced to the runoff in November. He eventually defeated challenger Sheriff Benny Napoleon and became the mayor of Detroit.
- Donna Frye ran as a write-in candidate for mayor of San Diego in 2004. A controversy erupted when several thousand votes for her were not counted because the voters had failed to fill in the bubble next to the write-in line. Had those votes been counted, she would have won the election.
- Michael Jarjura was re-elected mayor of Waterbury, Connecticut, in 2005 as a write-in candidate after losing the Democratic party primary to Karen Mulcahy, who used to serve as Waterbury's tax collector before Jarjura fired her in 2004 "for what he claimed was her rude and abusive conduct toward citizens". After spending $100,000 on a general elections write-in campaign, Jarjura received 7,907 votes, enough for a plurality of 39%.
- James Maher won the mayorship of Baxter Estates, New York, on March 15, 2005, as a write-in candidate with 29 votes. Being the only one on the ballot, the incumbent mayor, James Neville, did not campaign, as he did not realize that there was a write-in campaign going on. Neville received only 13 votes.
- Beverly O'Neil won a third term as Mayor of Long Beach, California, as a write-in candidate in 2002. The Long Beach City City Charter has a term limit amendment that says a candidate cannot be on the ballot after two full terms, but does not prevent the person from running as a write-in candidate. She finished first in a seven-candidate primary, but did not receive more than 50% of the vote, forcing a runoff contest. In the runoff, still restricted from the ballot, she got roughly 47% of the vote in a three-way election that included a second write-in candidate.
- Michael Sessions, an 18-year-old high school senior, won as a write-in candidate for Mayor of Hillsdale, Michigan, in 2005. He was too young to qualify for the ballot.
- In 2021, Byron Brown, the incumbent mayor of Buffalo, New York, defeated Democratic challenger India Walton in the general election, by running a successful write-in campaign after losing the Democratic primary to Walton.
- In Galesburg, Illinois, an error by the Galesburg Election Commission in late 2010 gave city council candidate Chuck Reynolds the wrong number of signatures he required to be on the ballot for the April 2011 city council election, resulting in his removal from the ballot when challenged by incumbent Russell Fleming. Reynolds ran as a write-in vote in the April 2011 election, and lost by nine votes.
- Anthony A. Williams, then incumbent Mayor of Washington, D.C., was forced to run as a write-in candidate in the 2002 Democratic primary, because he had too many invalid signatures for his petition. He won the Democratic primary, and went on to win re-election.
- In the November 8, 2011, election for Commonwealth's Attorney of Richmond County, Virginia, 16-year incumbent Wayne Emery was certified the winner as a write-in candidate over challenger James Monroe by a margin of 53 votes (2.4%) out of 2,230 votes cast, after his petitions were challenged and his name was removed from the ballot.
- In the August 4, 2020, primary election of Ypsilanti Township, Michigan, Monica Ross-Williams, a then Ypsilanti Township Trustee, received 3,478 write-in votes for Ypsilanti Township Clerk, for the highest number of write-in votes in any election in Washtenaw County, Michigan history.
- In the 1997 election for Mayor of Talkeetna, Alaska, Stubbs the Cat won over the two human candidates. He was re-elected every mayoral election thereafter, and served until his death on July 2, 2017.
- In 2011, in Pacific, Washington, Marine veteran Cy Sun ousted incumbent mayor Rich Hildreth as a write-in candidate, using a comprehensive ground game in the small town to convince locals to support him over Hildreth, whom he accused of corruption. After the election, the county elections office reported that a sufficient number of write-ins votes had made it possible that a write-in could win, and after a count of the write-ins, Sun beat Hildreth by 464 to 401. Sun's mayorship was plagued by political and physical challenges, and Sun would be recalled in 2013.
- Eau Claire County, Wisconsin sheriff Ron Cramer, formerly a sheriff's deputy, won election as Eau Claire County's 47th sheriff, defeating disgraced 10-year incumbent sheriff Richard M. Hewitt in a write-in campaign hastily organized just weeks before the election in 1996. He has handily won reelection every four years since, usually running unopposed.
- Lynda Neuwirth defeated the lone candidate on the ballot, Joseph DiPasquale, for the Ellicottville, New York village justice position on March 19, 2019; Neuwirth received three votes to DiPasquale's two. Neuwirth was ousted after only two months in the position, as voters had approved a referendum abolishing the court the previous November; when the abolition was delayed two months, Neuwirth was not allowed to retain her seat and was replaced by a justice from the surrounding town, which will absorb the village court's jurisdiction.
- Lon Lafferty won as a write-in for the Martin County, Kentucky Judge Executive election in 2022, defeating four other write-in candidates—Marlena Slone, Jimmy Don Kerr, Benjamin York and Mitchell Crum—with approximately 60% of the vote. This election was solely decided by write-in—the first election in Martin County's history in which all of the candidates were write-ins—after the previous Judge Executive, Colby Kirk, resigned from office and withdrew his candidacy three weeks before the election to take over as President/CEO of economic development organization One East Kentucky. (Governor Andy Beshear had appointed Lafferty to fill the seat for the remaining two months of Kirk's term.)

=== Other elections ===
- Aaron Schock was elected to the District 150 School Board in Peoria, Illinois, in 2001 by a write-in vote, after his petitions were challenged and his name was removed from the ballot. He defeated the incumbent by over 2,000 votes, approximately 6,400 to 4,300 votes. He went on to serve in the Illinois House of Representatives, and was elected to the United States House of Representatives in 2008. He was later forced to resign for misuse of taxpayer funds.
- John Adams became an Orange County, California judge in November 2002 after running along with 10 other write-in candidates in the primaries on March 5, 2002, against incumbent Judge Ronald Kline. After the filing deadline in which no candidate filed to run against Kline, a computer hacker discovered that Judge Kline had child pornography on his home computer. Kline got less than 50% of the vote in the primaries, requiring a runoff between him and write-in candidate John Adams (who actually received more votes than Kline). After some legal maneuvers, Kline's name was removed from the general elections, leaving the general election a runoff between Adams and Gay Sandoval, who was the second highest write-in vote getter. Charges against Kline were eventually thrown out.
- On September 15, 2009, four write-in candidates in the Independence Party primaries for various offices in Putnam County, New York, defeated their on-ballot opponents.
- In a May 2011 school board election for the Bentley School Board in Michigan, Lisa Osborn ran as a write-in candidate and needed just one vote to win a seat. However, she did not receive any votes, even from herself. She explained herself by saying that she was at her son's baseball game and did not have time to go to the polls.

=== California's Proposition 14 impact on write-in candidates ===
In 2010, California voters passed Proposition 14 which set up a new election system for the United States Senate, United States House of Representatives, all statewide offices (governor, lieutenant governor, secretary of state, state treasurer, state controller, attorney general, insurance commissioner, and superintendent of public instruction), California Board of Equalization, and for the California State Legislature. In the system set up by Proposition 14, there are two rounds of voting, and the top two vote-getters for each race in the first round (the primary (Note: Prior to 2020, the primary was held in June. Since 2020, the primary has been alternating between March and June, with March being the month held in years divisible by 4, and June in years not divisble by 4.)) advance to a second round (the general election, held in November). Proposition 14 specifically prohibits write-in candidates in the second round, and this prohibition was upheld in a court challenge. Another court challenge to the prohibition on write-in candidates in the second round was filed in July 2014.

Although Proposition 14 prohibits write-in candidates in the second round of voting, it has created conditions that can make it easier for write-in candidates in the first round to advance to the second round. This generally happens in elections where only one candidate is listed on the ballot. Since in each race the top two vote-getters from the first round are guaranteed to advance to the second round, if only one candidate is listed on the ballot, a write-in candidate can easily advance to the second round, as the write-in candidate would only have to compete with other write-in candidates for the second spot, not with any listed candidates. In some jungle primary systems, if the winner in the first round wins by more than 50% of the vote, then the second (runoff) round gets cancelled, but in the system set up by Proposition 14, a second (runoff) round is required regardless of the percent of the vote that the winner of the first round received. Proposition 14 therefore guarantees that if only one candidate is listed on the ballot in the first round, a write-in candidate running against the one listed candidate can earn a spot for the second round with as little as one vote. (Note: In the June 2012 election, write-in candidate Lee H. Chauser running in the 33rd Senate District won a spot in the runoff race with as few as 3 votes.)

The first election in which Proposition 14 went into effect was the 2012 elections.

California elections in which primary election write-in candidates advanced to the general election
Year	Number of write-in candidates who successfully made it to the November general election	Offices for which write-in candidates successfully made it to the November general election	General election results for candidates who qualified as write-in candidates in the primaries				Links to election results	
Year	Number of write-in candidates who successfully made it to the November general election	Offices for which write-in candidates successfully made it to the November general election	Wins	Max	Average	Min	Primary (March/June)	General (November)
2012	5	SD3, SD9, SD33, AD15, AD31	0	36.0%	23.4%	13.2%		
2014	16	CD23, CD44, BOE3, SD16, SD22, SD36, AD5, AD14, AD21, AD31, AD41, AD51, AD60, AD67, AD75, AD76	0	46.6%	31.3%	13.3%		
2016	15 (Note: In AD62, two write-in candidates received an equal number of votes (32), and tied for second place against the first-place finisher, incumbent Autumn Burke. Therefore, the two write-in candidates advanced to the general election within one race)	CD14, SD33, AD1, AD2, AD7, AD32, AD46, AD49, AD51, AD58, AD62, AD70, AD73, AD76	0	43.9%	28.5% (Note: Data is for the 14 distinct races in which the results for the two write-in candidates who advanced in AD62, one of whom received 17.2% and the other received 5.6%, are summed up to 22.8%. When treating the two candidates in AD62 as distinct candidates and averaging over 15 candidates, the average goes down to 26.6% and the min (obviously) drops to 5.6%)	13.9%		
2018	12	CD13, CD19, CD32, AD4, AD7, AD20, AD21, AD27, AD51, AD61, AD64, AD69	0	32.6%	23.6%	11.6%		
2020	11	SD3, SD9, SD25, SD31, SD33, SD39, AD7, AD11, AD17, AD21, AD45	0	41.0%	30.8%	11.1%		
2022	11	SD24, SD26, AD8, AD9, AD14, AD18, AD41, AD43, AD48, AD54, AD59	0	40.0%	25.8%	10.1%		
2024	5	AD4, AD20, AD32, AD45, AD65	0	40.9% (Note: In AD32, Bakersfield City Councilman Ken Weir received only 40.9% of the vote in the general election (as a candidate listed on the ballot after winning the primary as a write-in candidate), losing to Congressman Vince Fong who had dropped out of the race, but was unable to remove his name from the ballot. Since Fong did not take the seat although he won the election (as Fong also won an election for Congress held on the same day), a special election was called to fill the vacancy. Weir did not run in the special election.)	33.4%	27.1%		

== Other countries ==
With a few exceptions, the practice of recognizing write-in candidates is typically viewed internationally as a tradition in the United States.

- A bizarre incident involving a fictitious write-in candidacy occurred in the small town of Picoazá, Ecuador, in 1967. A company ran a series of campaign-themed advertisements for a foot powder called Pulvapies. Some of the slogans used included "Vote for any candidate, but if you want well-being and hygiene, vote for Pulvapies", and "For Mayor: Honorable Pulvapies". The foot powder Pulvapies ended up receiving the most votes in the election.
- In Brazil, until the introduction of electronic voting in 1994, the ballot had no names written for legislative candidates, so many voters would protest by voting on fictional characters or religious figures. In a famous case, the São Paulo city zoo rhinoceros Cacareco got around 100,000 votes in the 1959 elections for the municipal council, more than any candidate. However, those votes were not considered because Brazilian law stipulates that a candidate must be affiliated to a political party to take office.
- Until 2013, write-in candidates were permitted at municipal elections in France for councils of communes with a population of less than 2500.
- Elections in Sweden are open list, with voters placing into the ballot box an envelope containing their choice of either a ballot preprinted with the name of a registered party or else a blank ballot on which they write the name of a party (registered or unregistered) and optionally that of a candidate. A person must consent to being a candidate listed on a preprinted ballot, but there was no such obligation for write-in names until the 2018 general election. In the 2006 municipal elections, the Sweden Democrats (SD) won seats on several councils where they had no nominee or preprinted ballots; most SD voters wrote the party name but no candidate name. The seats were filled by the name most often written, if any, and left empty if no voter wrote in a name. One example was Vårgårda Municipality, where only 3 of 143 SD voters wrote in names, of which two were for an ineligible non-resident; the winner resigned his seat as he opposed the SD and his sole vote was cast by his father as a joke. In 2010 one Jimmy Åkesson was elected to Staffanstorp Municipality council after a single SD voter wrote his name. The voter apparently intended SD leader Jimmie Åkesson, not resident in Staffanstorp.
- In elections in Austria, writing on a ballot paper does not invalidate a vote provided the voter's preference is clear (Open list). In the 1990 legislative election the unpopular SPÖ, worried that voters would not select it on the party-list ballot, advised them to write in the name of Franz Vranitzky, its popular leader. Such ballots would be interpreted as SPÖ votes. A similar scenario happened in the 2024 European Parliament election in Italy, when Forza Italia urged their voters to write-in Silvio Berlusconi who died a year earlier.
- In many German federal states, it is possible to write people on the ballot paper by hand in municipal council elections or mayoral elections if only one person is running or if the number of candidates is lower than the number of seats in the municipal council (″Einzelvorschlag″).

== Protest ==
- In United States elections, write-in votes are sometimes cast for fictional characters, notably Mickey Mouse, whose name usage as a protest vote has been attested since 1932.
- Mad magazine satirically called to vote for Alfred E. Neuman as a write-in candidate for every U.S. presidential election from 1956 to 1980 with slogans like "You could do worse– you always have!" and "There are bigger idiots running for office!".
- In the 1980 U.S. presidential election, guitarist Joe Walsh ran a mock write-in campaign, promising to make his song "Life's Been Good" the new national anthem if he won, and running on a platform of "Free Gas for Everyone". Though Walsh (then aged 33) was not old enough to actually assume the office, he wanted to raise public awareness of the election. (In 1992, Walsh purportedly ran for vice-president, in his song "Vote For Me", a track on his album Songs for a Dying Planet, which was released that year.)
- During the 2000 United States Congress Elections, film-maker Michael Moore led a campaign for voters to submit a ficus tree as a write-in candidate. This campaign was replicated across the country and was recounted in an episode of The Awful Truth.
- In 2012, a campaign was waged to write in Charles Darwin against Georgia congressman Paul Broun (who was running unopposed) after Broun "called evolution and other areas of science 'lies straight from the pit of hell.'" Darwin received approximately 4,000 votes. However, because Darwin was not registered as an official candidate (some states require even write-ins to be pre-registered), the Georgia Secretary of State did not tabulate those votes.
- In 2016, several grassroots campaigns to elect Bernie Sanders President as a write-in candidate were established on social media in the run-up to the United States presidential election. Though Sanders continued to campaign for Democratic nominee Hillary Clinton, supporters pointed to alleged DNC bias in the Democratic Party's presidential primaries against Sanders, and Clinton's email scandal, and continued to support him. Both Clinton and Donald Trump would have had to win less than the required 270 electoral college votes for Sanders to have denied either candidate the presidency, and for the election to be passed to the House of Representatives – thus the initial write-in campaign around Vermont, offering only three college votes, was not successful, but Sanders did receive almost six percent of the vote there. The campaign expanded to include all 12 eligible states (one of which listed Sanders as an official write-in candidate), and relied on states such as California, with a high electoral college vote count and large support for Sanders, to be successful in denying both Trump and Clinton.
- In Sweden, all handwritten votes are scanned by computer and the results published online, although only votes for valid parties count towards determining successful candidates. In the 2010 general election, ineffective votes included 120 for Donald Duck and 2 for "myself", as well as several computer code snippets apparently intended as code injection attacks aimed at either the program which tallied the votes or the browsers of users who accessed the results website.
- In the 2018 Egyptian presidential election, owing to a large number of candidates being arrested or barred from running, Egyptian football star Mohamed Salah received over a million votes, as many Egyptians cancelled out the names of both candidates and wrote his instead. This was higher than the number of votes received by the second place candidate, Moussa Mostafa Moussa. Write-in votes are not deemed valid in Egypt.
- As noted above, in the 2025 Battle River—Crowfoot federal by-election in Canada, the election was targeted by the Longest Ballot Committee protest group, resulting in 214 candidates registering for the election and forcing Elections Canada to switch from a traditional ballot to a blank write-in-only ballot for all candidates.

== See also ==
- None of the above
  - None of These Candidates, Nevada's implementation of the "None of the above" voting option
- Paper candidate
- Star candidate
