= 2003 Anchorage mayoral election =

- April 1, 2003
- Turnout: 34.45%
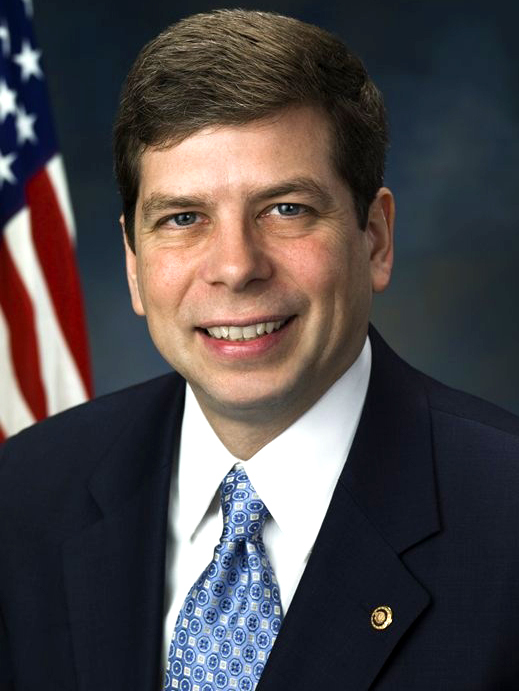

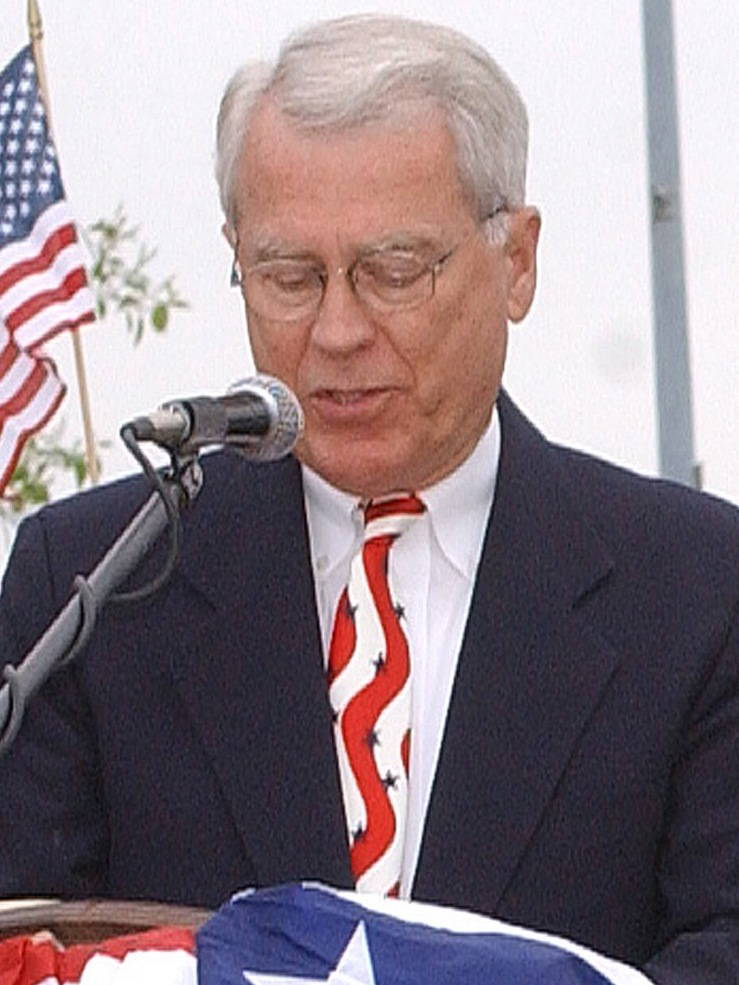

Candidate	Mark Begich	George Wuerch	Rick Mystrom
Popular vote	28,604	23,615	9,954
Percentage	45.03%	37.17%	15.67%
Mayor before election
George Wuerch
Republican
Elected mayor
Mark Begich
Democratic

The 2003 Anchorage mayoral election was held on April 1, 2003, to elect the mayor of Anchorage, Alaska. It saw election of Mark Begich, who unseated incumbent mayor George Wuerch.

An assembly ordinance and ballot proposition passed in Anchorage in 2003 had lowered the threshold required to avoid a mayoral runoff from 50% of the vote to 45%. Since Begich surpassed this margin, no runoff was necessary. Wuerch was the first, and until 2024 only, mayor of Anchorage to lose re-election since it became a borough in 1975.

== Candidates ==
- Mark Begich, former Anchorage Assemblyman, 1994 and 2000 mayoral candidate
- Jennifer Citti
- Daniel DeNardo
- David Dunsmore
- Thomas Mark Higgins
- Tom Layne
- Bruce J. Lemke
- Ray Malcolm
- Rick Mystrom, former mayor
- George Wuerch, incumbent mayor
- Richard Zeigler, 1994 mayoral candidate

== Results ==
Results
Party	Candidate	Votes	%
Nonpartisan	Mark Begich	28,604	45.03
Nonpartisan	George Wuerch (incumbent)	23,615	37.17
Nonpartisan	Richard Mystrom	9,954	15.67
Nonpartisan	David Dunsmore	488	0.77
Nonpartisan	Jennifer Citti	195	0.31
Nonpartisan	Thomas Mark Higgins	144	0.23
Nonpartisan	Richard Zeigler	135	0.21
Nonpartisan	Tom Layne	103	0.16
Nonpartisan	Daniel DeNardo	97	0.15
Nonpartisan	Ray Malcolm	61	0.1
Nonpartisan	Bruce J. Lemke	49	0.08
Write-in	Write-in	79	0.12
Turnout		63,524	34.45
