= 2006 Anchorage mayoral election =

- April 4, 2006
- Turnout: 35.02%
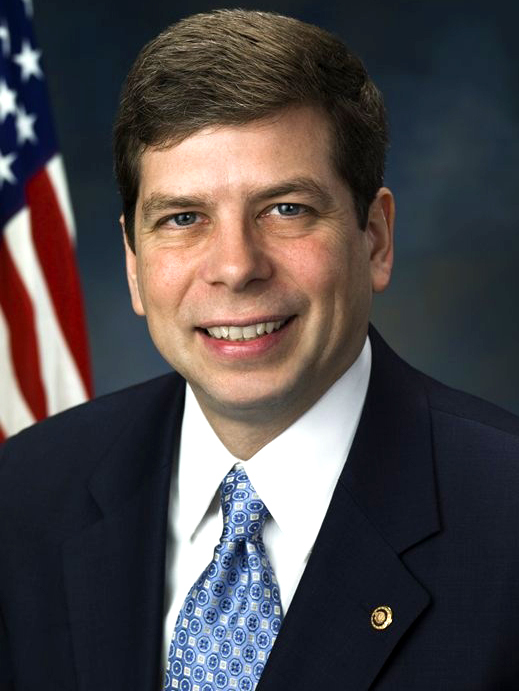

Candidate	Mark Begich	Jack Frost
Popular vote	39,468	28,760
Percentage	55.95%	40.77%
Mayor before election
Mark Begich
Democratic
Elected mayor
Mark Begich
Democratic

The 2006 Anchorage mayoral election was held on April 4, 2006, to elect the mayor of Anchorage, Alaska. It saw reelection of Mark Begich.

Since Begich had received more than a 45% plurality of the vote, no runoff was necessary. Begich retired as mayor on January 3, 2009, after having been elected to the United States Senate.

== Candidates ==
- Mark Begich, incumbent mayor and former Anchorage Assemblyman
- Jack Frost, local media broadcast personality and 2000 mayoral candidate
- Thomas Mark Higgins, 2003 mayoral candidate
- Nick Moe

== Results ==
Results
Party	Candidate	Votes	%
Nonpartisan	Mark Begich (incumbent)	39,468	55.95
Nonpartisan	Jack Frost	28,760	40.77
Nonpartisan	Nick Moe	1,747	2.48
Nonpartisan	Thomas Mark Higgins	431	431
Write-in	Write-in	135	0.19
Turnout		70,541	35.02
