= Miller v. Treadwell =

Series of lawsuits

Miller v. Treadwell, also known as Miller v. Campbell, is a series of three lawsuits filed by U.S. Senate candidate, Joe Miller, in both federal and Alaska state courts, that dispute vote-counting methods and other procedures conducted by the Alaska Division of Elections relating to the November 2, 2010 general election.

The first suit was filed by Miller in the U.S. District Court of Alaska on November 9, 2010, That suit was directed at invalidating write-in ballots that did not perfectly spell the last name of Miller's opponent, Lisa Murkowski, or that did not reproduce her name as it appeared on her declaration of write-in candidacy. When he filed the suit, Miller also sought a preliminary injunction requesting a suspension of the hand count of all the write-in votes pending a final order of the federal court. The judge denied the injunction, stating that irreparable harm would not occur because disputed ballots could be kept separate for re-examination. Miller also filed a suit in State court on November 11, asking for voter rolls to compare to the number of votes cast in certain precincts, and to look for evidence of vote fraud.

On November 19, the federal judge directed Miller to move his suit to State court for a determination of whether the Division of Elections was violating Alaska law, and he issued an order halting the certification of the election, pending the outcome of the litigation. Miller then filed his second State court lawsuit regarding the election in the Alaska Superior Court on November 22. All of Miller's claims were rejected by the judge on December 10. Miller appealed the ruling to the Alaska Supreme Court; they heard oral arguments on December 17 and have fast-tracked their decision-making. The federal court retained jurisdiction of the U.S. constitutional issues that Miller raised in his November 9 Complaint; namely, that when the State Division of Elections used a voter intent standard in counting write-in ballots, it violated the Elections Clause and the Due Process Clause. According to Miller, the State election statute should be strictly construed to prohibit the counting of ballots in a candidates' favor if the ballots do not exactly comply with the clear and mandatory language of the statute. The federal judge has indicated he will rule in an expedited fashion on any U.S. constitutional issues that remain after the ruling by the Alaska Supreme court.

== Background ==
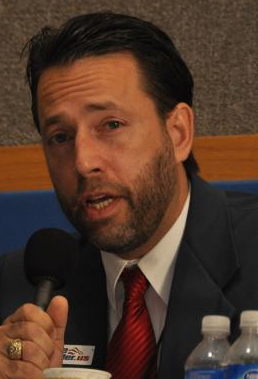
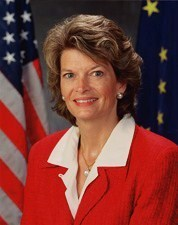
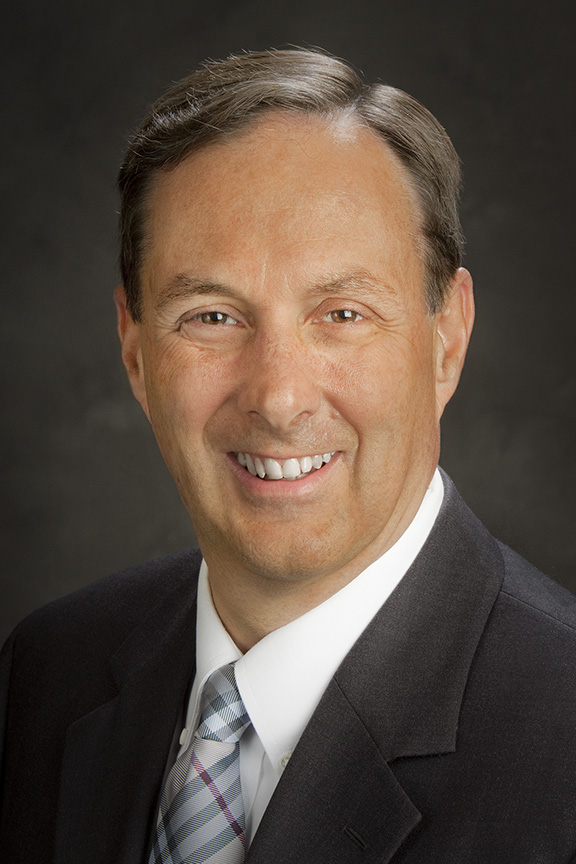
From left: Unsuccessful U.S. Senate candidate and plaintiff Joe Miller, his main election opponent and incumbent U.S. Senator Lisa Murkowski, and then-Lieutenant Governor and defendant Craig Campbell.

Incumbent U.S. Senator Murkowski, a Republican, ran as a write-in candidate in the November 2010 general election because she had been defeated by Miller in the August 2010 Republican primary. The largest number of ballots cast in the November election were write-ins which required a hand-count to determine the names written on those ballots.

== Federal lawsuit ==
Miller v. Treadwell
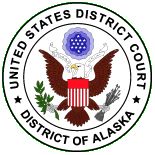
- Court: United States District Court for the District of Alaska
- Full case name: Joe Miller v. Lieutenant Governor Mead Treadwell, in his official capacity; and the State of Alaska, Division of Elections
- Decided: December 28, 2010
- Docket nos.: 3:10-cv-0252
- Citation: 736 F. Supp. 2d 1240

Court membership
- Judge sitting: Ralph Beistline

When Alaska's state Division of Elections announced that it would consider voter intent when reviewing the write-in ballots, Miller sued to prevent the counting of ballots that did not perfectly spell Murkowski's last name, or that did not reproduce her name exactly as it was stated on Murkowski's declaration of write-in candidacy, or that had penmanship issues. Miller claimed State law was very strict in this regard, and that all such ballots should be discounted. He claimed the federal court had jurisdiction saying that State election officials would be violating the Elections Clause of the U.S. Constitution and the Equal Protection Clause of the 14th Amendment by using a voter intent standard. On November 19, the court ruled against Miller's request for a preliminary injunction to immediately stop the write-in vote count, but allowed the lawsuit to continue. Alaska election officials said they counted votes that are misspelled if they are phonetic to Murkowski, claiming that Alaska case law including decisions of the Alaska Supreme Court supports this practice. The Alaska Department of Law asked the federal judge to dismiss the case because it is fundamentally concerned with a question of State law that can be decided in the State courts and suggested that Miller was forum shopping by taking an alleged violation of a State statute, and bootstrapping it into a violation of provision of the U.S. Constitution.

On November 15 the Alaska Federation of Natives asked to be included in the lawsuit, claiming standing because if Miller received his requested relief, certain voters whom the AFN represents would be disenfranchised – namely members of the native population, non-native speakers of English, and people with disabilities that caused them to have shaky or poor handwriting. U.S. District judge Ralph Beistline rejected both AFN's and Murkowski's requests to intervene.

== Write-in count completed ==
The Miller campaign had observers present during the count who questioned the validity of over 8,000 ballots. By the end of the counting on November 17, the Division of Elections showed Murkowski having a lead of over 10,000 votes, with about 8,000 of those votes challenged by Miller. At that point, even if all the challenged ballots were thrown out, Murkowski would still lead by about 2,200 votes. Hoping to pick up additional votes, the Miller campaign demanded a hand recount of the entire election, claiming that because Murkowski's votes were all verified by visual inspection, Miller's should also have the same, individualized treatment. The Director of the Division of Elections replied that the State does not do recounts completely by hand; it uses optical scan equipment.

== State court lawsuits ==
Miller v. Treadwell
- Court: Alaska Supreme Court
- Full case name: Joe Miller v. Mead Treadwell, in his official capacity as Lieutenant Governor; and the State of Alaska, Division of Elections; and Lisa Murkowski
- Decided: December 22, 2010
- Citation: 245 P.3d 867

Court membership
- Judges sitting: Walter L. Carpeneti, Dana Fabe, Daniel E. Winfree, Morgan Christen

Case opinions
- Per curiam

After filing the federal lawsuit, Miller began a second legal action against Alaska election officials, this time, in State court, asking to inspect and count signatures of voters in more than 30 precincts. In support of the suit, Miller provided affidavits that cited, among other things, a ballot box that was not secured, and signatures that appeared similar. On November 16, the State election authorities agreed to provide Miller with the requested information. The Associated Press noted that similar signatures could be caused by voters requesting and receiving aid in filling out ballots, and that the affidavits suggesting fraud had been mostly by Miller supporters.

Shortly after, U.S. District Court Judge Beistline directed Miller to move his complaint to State court saying that the Alaska courts were in a better position than U.S. federal courts, to apply Alaska law to decide who won the election. But Beistline also said he would "review any constitutional issues that may exist once the state remedies have been exhausted". Miller then filed his second State case in Fairbanks where he lives, essentially repeating the allegations in his federal lawsuit Complaint, but adding new claims of vote fraud and bias. State attorneys succeeded in getting the case moved to the State capital in Juneau where the disputed ballots were being held and where the Alaska Division of Elections is located. The State also asked for an expedited ruling so that Alaska would not deprived of full representation in the upcoming Senate session.

After briefs and oral arguments, Judge William Carey of the Superior Court in Juneau disagreed with Miller's arguments, saying that if the Alaska Legislature had intended that a candidate's name must be spelled perfectly to count, it would have written the law to say that. Carey also dismissed Miller's assertions of vote fraud and other irregularities as unfounded. Miller's campaign replied that Carey's ruling modifies State law, and renewed calls for a hand count of all the ballots cast in the election.

=== Appeal to the Supreme Court of Alaska ===
On December 13, Miller appealed the Alaska Superior Court decision of the prior week to the Alaska Supreme Court. Miller's appeal was rejected by the Supreme Court on December 22, 2010.

== Discussion of constitutional issues in the media ==
Writing in Slate magazine, election law analyst Richard L. Hasen said Miller's federal complaint involved issues that can arise in close elections, and noted the value of sticking to established rules so that election officials cannot manipulate the vote. However, he also noted that the question of whether the Alaska statute required perfect spelling was a matter of statutory interpretation, and that Alaska's Supreme Court has a long history of interpreting statutes in favor of the voters to avoid disenfranchisement based on technicalities. Hasen also noted that Miller's constitutional claims derive from a concurring opinion in the 2000 U.S. Supreme Court case, Bush v. Gore, and said that the Election Clause claim would fail "because it would mean that election officials could never come up with regulations". Hasen also believed the Equal Protection argument, which is based on inconsistent treatment of similar ballots by different election officials, would also fail because in Bush v. Gore different election officials in different counties reviewed the ballots, but in Alaska, only one person was judging all the contested ballots.

== Continuation ==
After these events, a lawsuit was filed by supporters of Miller arguing that the state violated the Voting Rights Act by accepting misspellings on write-in ballots, using different counting methods for different types of candidates and by allowing voters to vote without showing identification. Alaska has taken the position that the lawsuit is moot and in any event beyond the statute of limitations. All of Miller's legal challenges eventually failed. The State of Alaska spent an estimated $100,000 defending itself from these suits, and pursued partial compensation from Miller, as well as proposing new voting rules regarding write-ins in order to prevent a recurrence.
