= 1994 Anchorage mayoral election =

- May 2, 1994 (first-round); May 17, 1994 (runoff)
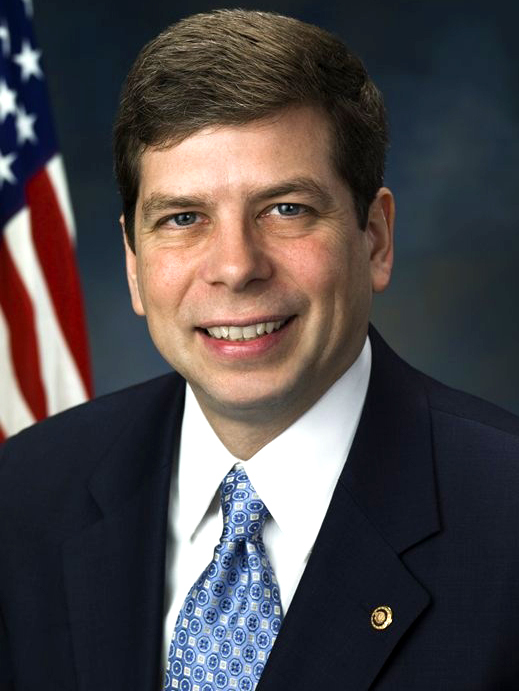

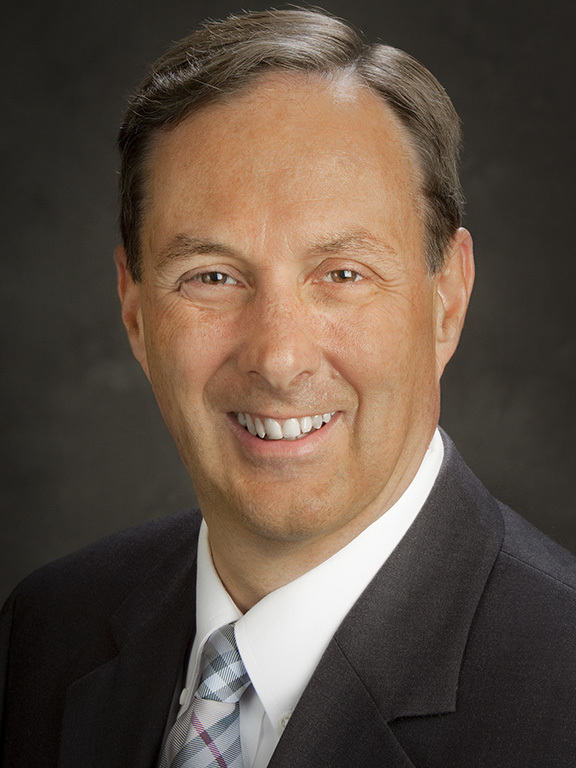

Candidate	Rick Mystrom	Mark Begich	Craig Campbell
First-round vote	15,049	13,533	12,018
First-round percentage	21.78%	19.58%	17.39%
Second-round vote	29,546	21,046
Second-round percentage	58.40%	41.60%
Candidate	Jim Kubitz	Heather Flynn	Joyce Murphy
First-round vote	7,594	6,896	6,181
First-round percentage	10.99%	9.98%	8.94%
Candidate	Virginia Collins
First-round vote	4,260
First-round percentage	6.16%
Mayor before election
Tom Fink
Republican
Elected mayor
Rick Mystrom
Republican

The 1994 Anchorage mayoral election was held on May 2 and May 17, 1994, to elect the mayor of Anchorage, Alaska. It saw the election of Rick Mystrom.

Since no candidate had received 40% of the vote in the first round (which at least one candidate was required to obtain to avoid a runoff), a runoff was held between the top-two finishers.

== Results ==
=== First round ===
First-round results
Party	Candidate	Votes	%
Nonpartisan	Rick Mystrom	15,049	21.78
Nonpartisan	Mark Begich	13,533	19.58
Nonpartisan	Craig Campbell	12,018	17.39
Nonpartisan	Jim Kubitz	7,594	10.99
Nonpartisan	Heather Flynn	6,896	9.98
Nonpartisan	Dr. Joyce Murphy	6,181	8.94
Nonpartisan	Virginia Collins	4,260	6.16
Nonpartisan	Pat Parnell	2,314	3.35
Nonpartisan	Mike John O'Callaghan	547	0.79
Nonpartisan	Richard "Ziggy" Ziegler	271	0.39
Nonpartisan	Michael J. P. DeFermo	134	0.19
Nonpartisan	Tom Staudenmaier	107	0.15
Nonpartisan	Matthew P. Gill	62	0.09
Nonpartisan	Charles E. McKee	58	0.08
Write-in	Write-ins	84	0.12
Turnout		69,108	49.52

=== Runoff ===
Runoff results
Party	Candidate	Votes	%
Nonpartisan	Rick Mystrom	29,546	58.40
Nonpartisan	Mark Begich	21,046	41.60
Turnout		50,592	
