= Concordance system =

Political principle in Switzerland

Concordance democracy is a type of governing / ruling a country that aims to involve as many different groups as possible (parties, associations, minorities, social groups) in the political process and to make decisions by reaching a consensus. In this respect, concordance democracy is a form of consensus democracy. The counter-model to concordance democracy is called competitive democracy or majority democracy.

In Swiss politics, the concordance system (German Konkordanzsystem) is manifested by the integration of the major political parties into the seven-member Federal Council.

The concordance system is based on two principles

- an arithmetic rule of proportionality: the Federal Council should be representative of the political forces of the country, that is, its composition should be similar to that of the Federal Assembly.
- a political rule of consensus: the government must reach a compromise, even though it is composed of antagonistic parties.

One of the reasons explaining the system, which also exists at the cantonal level, is the perceived "threat" of direct democracy, since a sizeable opposition could in principle "paralyse" the government by submitting too many referendum proposals.

The fact that the members of the government must reach common decisions and stand by them is referred to as the principle of collegiality (German Kollegialitätsprinzip), grounded in the Federal Constitution (art. 177 al.1). The members of the Federal Council are supposed to forgo party politics and promote a cooperative spirit among the members of the executive. They must defend the government's official positions even if doing so goes against their personal views or those of their party.

== History ==
In 1848 the new Federal Constitution made Switzerland a federation of States, and no longer a Confederation. It thus introduced an executive organ at the federal level, the Swiss Federal Council. The membership of the Federal Council has never been changed in its entirety, since there have always been partial elections of some of its members. Technically, Switzerland has always had the same stable and consensual government, in contrast to most western democracies, which see regular alternance between left and right major parties. The concordance system started in 1891 with the election of Josef Zemp, a Christian Conservative, to the Federal Council, which had previously been composed entirely of Free Democrats. The fact that this led to a reduced opposition from outside the government has since been referred to by some Swiss political scientists as "The Zemp effect". From 1959 to 2003, the Federal Council comprised two Free Democrats, two Social Democrats, two Christian Democrats, and one member of the Swiss People's Party, based on an unwritten rule known as the "magic formula". Since 2003, however, the composition has changed to reflect the rise of the Swiss People's Party.

== See also ==
- Concord Principles
- Consociationalism
- Politics of Switzerland
- Swiss Federal Council
- National unity government – formed temporarily during crises in countries which normally use other partisan systems
