= George Wuerch =

American politician (born 1936)

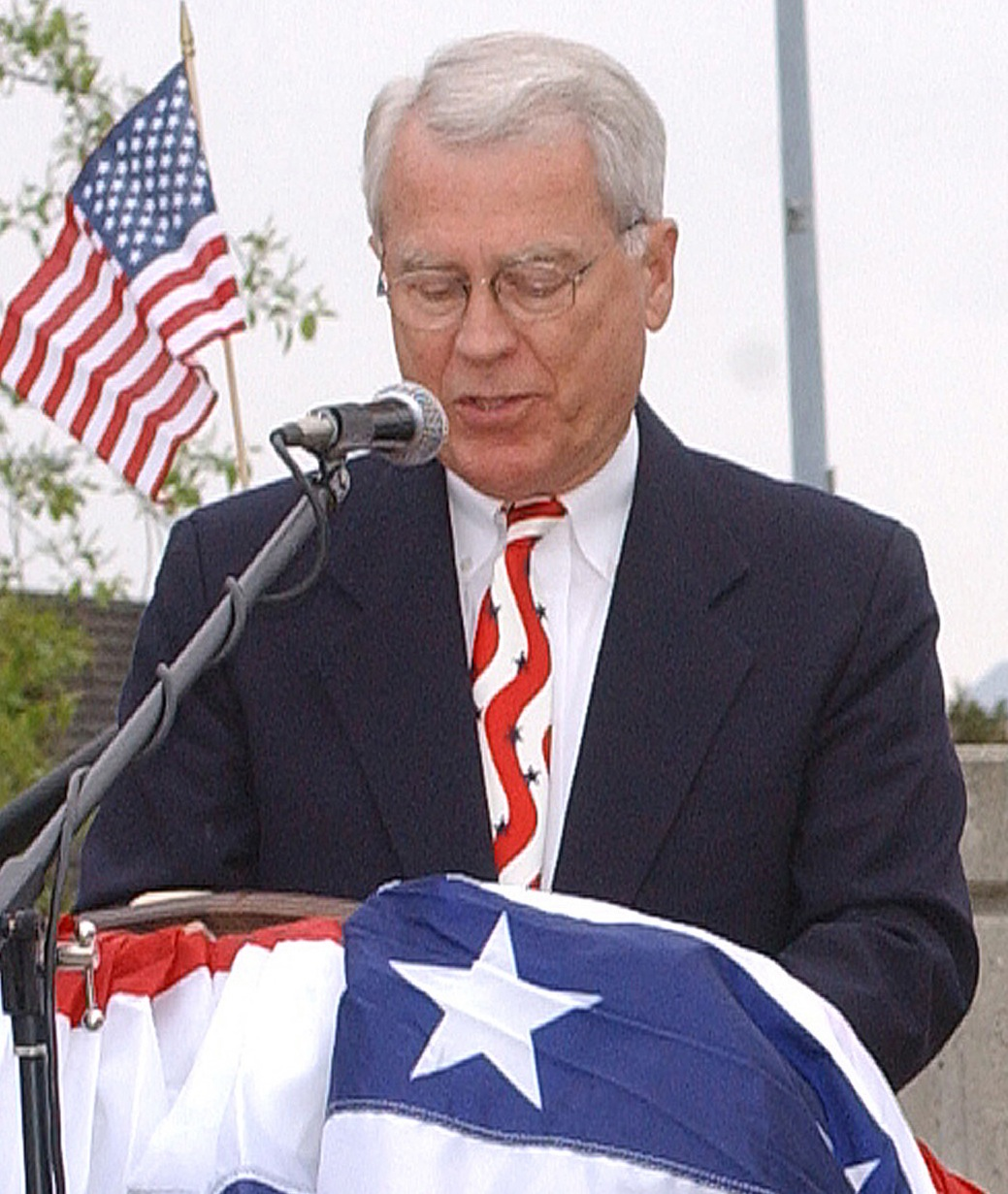

Mayor of Anchorage
- In office July 1, 2000 – July 1, 2003
- Preceded by: Rick Mystrom
- Succeeded by: Mark Begich

Chair of the Anchorage Assembly
- In office May 4, 1999 – December 14, 1999
- Preceded by: Fay Von Gemmingen
- Succeeded by: Kevin Meyer

Member of the Anchorage Assembly from Seat F
- In office May 1, 1995 – June 26, 2000
- Preceded by: Dick Traini
- Succeeded by: Wilda Hudson

Personal details
- Born: 1936 (age 89–90) Tacoma, Washington, U.S.
- Party: Republican
- Spouse: Brenda
- Children: 2

George Poe Wuerch (born 1936) is an American politician and a member of the Republican Party. He served as mayor of Anchorage, Alaska from 2000 to 2003.

In the 2003 mayoral election, he was defeated for reelection by former city assemblyman Mark Begich. Before this, Wuerch was chair of the Anchorage Assembly and chair of the board of directors for the Anchorage Chamber of Commerce.

A retired United States Marine Corps officer with 21 years of service, Wuerch has also been governmental affairs manager for the Northwest Alaskan Gasline, the founder and president of Fluor Daniel Alaska Engineering, and the vice president of corporate affairs for the Alyeska Pipeline Service Company.

== Education ==
Wuerch attended Oregon State University and graduated in 1957 with his wife Brenda Wuerch. While in OSU Wuerch was a member of Phi Delta Theta fraternity.

== Political career ==
As mayor of Anchorage, George Wuerch removed a gay pride exhibit from the Loussac Library creating controversy and a lawsuit against the city.

== Family ==
George and Brenda Wuerch have two daughters, Karrie Wuerch who lives in Corvallis, Oregon and Debra Wuerch who resides in Anchorage, Alaska.

== See also ==
- 2000 Anchorage mayoral election
- 2003 Anchorage mayoral election

Preceded by Rick Mystrom	Mayor of Anchorage; 2000—2003	Succeeded by Mark Begich
