= Rick Mystrom =

American businessman and politician

32nd Mayor of Anchorage
- In office July 1, 1994 – July 1, 2000
- Preceded by: Tom Fink
- Succeeded by: George Wuerch

Member of the Anchorage Assembly from Seat D
- In office 1979–1985
- Preceded by: Bill Besser
- Succeeded by: Bill Faulkner

Personal details
- Born: 1943 (age 82–83) Minnesota, U.S.
- Party: Republican
- Children: 3

Richard Mystrom (born 1944) is an American politician, businessman, and author who served as the 32nd mayor of the Municipality of Anchorage from 1994 to 2000. He is a member of the Republican party.

== Early life and education ==
Mystrom was born in Minnesota in 1944 and attended the University of Colorado Boulder where he studied economics and political science. In 1964, he was diagnosed with Type 1 diabetes. He moved to Alaska in 1972.

== Career ==
In 1975, Mystrom established Mystrom/Beck Advertising. In 1982, he received the Small Business Person of the Year Award from President Ronald Reagan. In 1990, he sold his advertising business, which was later merged into the Nerland Agency.

Mystrom was elected to the Anchorage Assembly in 1979, serving until 1985. During the 1980s, Mystrom led the Anchorage Organizing Committee, which sought to bring the 1992 or 1994 Winter Olympic Games to the city.

In 1994, he defeated Democrat Mark Begich to succeed Tom Fink as mayor of Anchorage. In 1997, he withstood a challenge from Fink, a fellow Republican. Mystrom was widely considered the more moderate of the two Republican candidates. In office, Mystrom emphasized crime reduction and championed the "City of Lights" beautification program, encouraging residents and employers to ornament their homes and businesses with decorative lights during Anchorage's dark winter.

In the 2003 election, he challenged incumbent Republican mayor George Wuerch in a three-way race. Begich, who had unsuccessfully faced Wuerch in 2000, was elected.

== Personal life ==
He has two sons, Nick and Richard, and a daughter, Jennifer, with his former wife, Mary.

Preceded by Tom Fink	Mayor of Anchorage; 1994 – 2000	Succeeded by George Wuerch
