= W. E. Bradley =

American politician

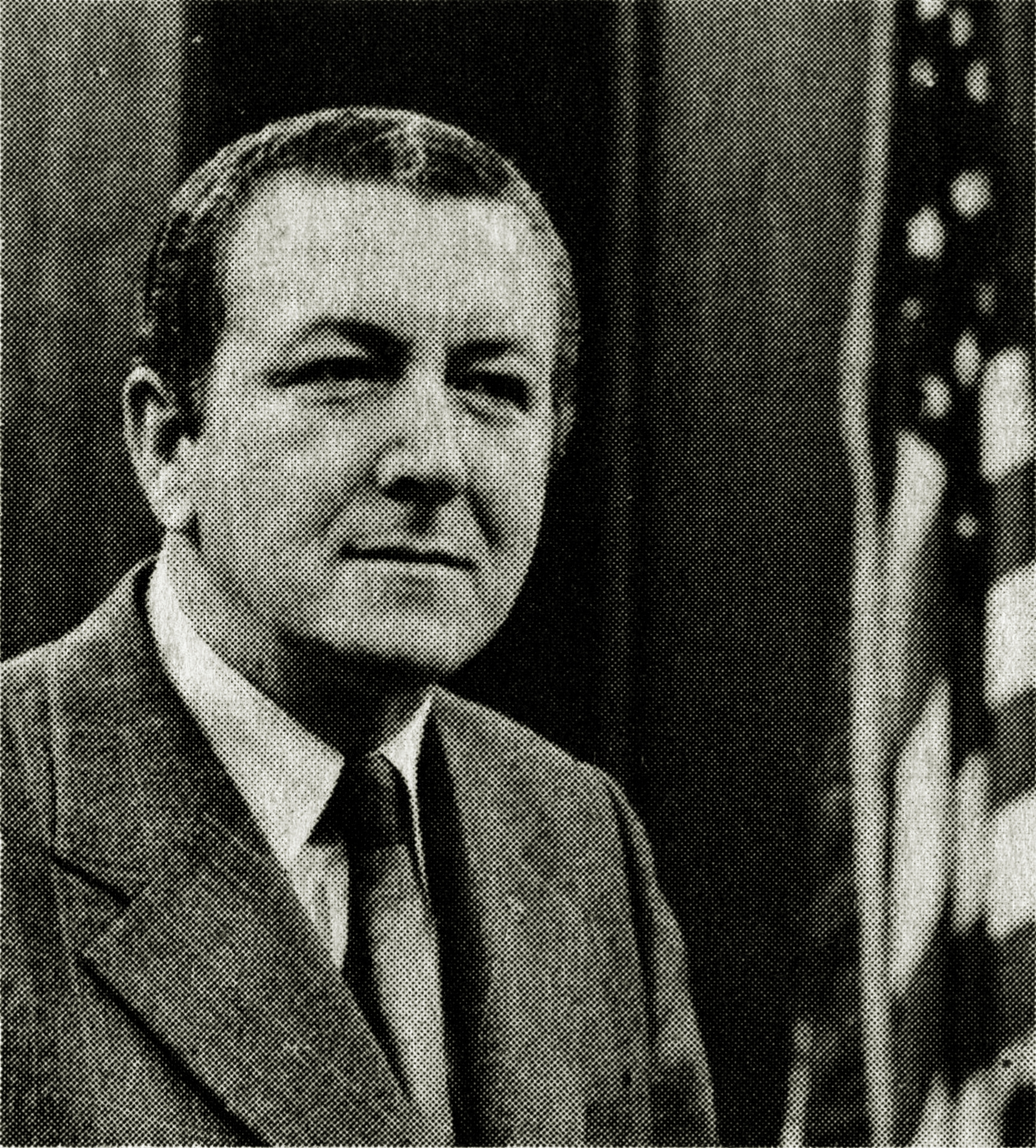
- Bradley in 1976

Member of the Alaska Senate from the F district
- In office 1975–1983

Member of the Anchorage Assembly
- In office 1985–1988

Personal details
- Born: Wray Erickson Bradley; October 3, 1923 Jackson, North Carolina, U.S.
- Died: March 20, 2010 (aged 86) Sand Springs, Oklahoma, U.S.
- Party: Republican
- Education: Wake Forest University; American University

Wray Erickson Bradley (October 3, 1923 – March 20, 2010), also known as Brad Bradley, was an American politician. A member of the Republican Party, he served in the Alaska Senate from 1975 to 1983 and in the Anchorage Assembly from 1985 to 1988.

== Life and career ==
Bradley was born in Jackson, North Carolina, the son of Fulton and Lennie Bradley. He served in the armed forces during World War II, which after his discharge, he attended Wake Forest University, earning his BS degree. After earning his degree, he attended the American University, completing post graduate work. He was a businessman.

Bradley served in the Alaska Senate from 1975 to 1983. He lost his seat in the Senate, in 1982, when he ran as a Republican candidate for lieutenant governor of Alaska. He received 15,782 votes, but lost in the open primary election to candidate Steve McAlpine, who won with 25,517 votes, which after losing in the lieutenant gubernatorial election, he served in the Anchorage Assembly from 1985 to 1988.

== Death ==
Bradley died on March 20, 2010, at the Greentree Assisted Living in Sand Springs, Oklahoma, at the age of 86.
