= Nonbusiness Energy Property Tax Credit =

The Nonbusiness energy property tax credit, in the United States, provides a nonrefundable personal tax credit for Federal income tax purposes, for making a home more energy efficient. (Unlike a deduction, which lowers taxable income, a tax credit reduces the actual tax paid, dollar-for-dollar.) This credit was added to the Internal Revenue Code by the Energy Policy Act of 2005. The nonbusiness energy property credit expired on December 31, 2017, but was retroactively extended for tax years 2018 and 2019 on December 20, 2019 as part of the Further Consolidated Appropriations Act, 2020 (2020 United States federal budget). Further information about the legislation that extended the credit is at IRS.gov/Extenders.

== Credit ==
Nonbusiness energy property provided a credit for buying qualified energy efficiency improvements and provided credits in various amounts for costs relating to residential energy property expenses.26 U.S.C. § 25C(a)(2). Labor costs for onsite preparation, assembly, or original installation were included as eligible expenses for certain items.

== Eligibility ==
For an improvement to be eligible for the credit it must meet the following qualifications: (1) a component must meet or exceed the criteria established by the 2009 International Energy Conservation Code; (2) component is installed in or on a dwelling unit located in the United States and owned and used by the taxpayer as the taxpayer's principal residence; (3) the original use of such component commences with the taxpayer and (4) such component reasonably can be expected to remain in use for at least 5 years.

Residential energy property expenditures are eligible for the credit if the purchase: (1) is installed on or in connection with a dwelling unit located in the United States and owned by the taxpayer and used as his principal residence (section 121); (2) the item is originally placed in service by the taxpayer and (3) it is qualified energy property as defined by 26 U.S.C. § 25C(d)(2)(a) that meets certain performance and quality standards established by the code or by the Secretary.

== Limits ==
A tax credit of up to $500 is available to individuals for nonbusiness energy property, such as residential exterior doors and windows, insulation, heat pumps, furnaces, central air conditioners, and water heaters.

a. The credit varies depending on the type of improvement. b. There is a lifetime credit of $500. c. The improvements must be installed in the taxpayer's principal residence in the United States.

== Termination of credit ==
Items must have been placed in service before December 31, 2020, to be eligible for the credit.
