= June 2012 California elections =

- June 5, 2012

Elections were held in California on June 5, 2012. Two propositions, primary elections for each party's nominee for President, primary elections to determine the top-two candidates for California's Class I seat to the United States Senate, all of California's seats to the House of Representatives, all of the seats of the State Assembly, and all odd-numbered seats of the State Senate, who went on to compete against each other in a run-off on November 6, 2012, were on the ballot.

This was the first election with California's newly implemented nonpartisan blanket primary in effect, pursuant to Proposition 14, which passed with 53% voter approval in June 2010. Additionally, in November 2010, voters approved Proposition 20, which authorized a California Citizens Redistricting Commission to re-draw congressional district lines, in addition to its current job of drawing state senate district lines and state assembly district lines, taking away that job from the California state legislature. This was the first election which used the Citizens Redistricting Commission's maps.

== Primary elections ==
=== President of the United States ===
Incumbent president Barack Obama ran unopposed on the Democratic primary ballot. Governor Mitt Romney and Rep. Ron Paul competed in the Republican primary.

==== Republican primary ====
Results by county. Mitt Romney won all of California's 58 counties.

California Republican primary, 2012
Candidate	Votes	Percentage	Delegates
Mitt Romney	1,151,197	79.6%	169
Ron Paul	147,893	10.2%	0
Rick Santorum	75,802	5.2%	0
Newt Gingrich	55,458	3.8%	0
Buddy Roemer	9,714	0.7%	0
Fred Karger	6,481	0.4%	0
Unpledged delegates:			3
Total:	1,446,545	100%	172

Key:	Withdrew prior to contest

=== United States Senate ===
Results by county. Dianne Feinstein won all of California's 58 counties.

Open Primary Results
Party	Candidate	Votes	%
Democratic	Dianne Feinstein (Incumbent)	1,801,422	49.3
Republican	Elizabeth Emken	454,937	12.5
Republican	Dan Hughes	243,934	6.7
Republican	Rick Williams	120,931	3.3
Republican	Orly Taitz	113,563	3.1
Republican	Dennis Jackson	107,097	2.9
Republican	Greg Conlon	100,432	2.8
Republican	Al Ramirez	82,663	2.3
Libertarian	Gail Lightfoot	76,130	2.1
Democratic	Diane Stewart	74,358	2.0
Other	Others	475,150	13.0
Total votes		3,650,617	100

== Propositions ==
Two statewide propositions were on the primary ballot.

=== Proposition 28 ===
Results by county Yes: 50–60%; 60–70%; 70–80%

Proposition 28 is an initiative constitutional amendment that would change California state legislature term limits from a limit of 8 years for the Senate and 6 years for the Assembly, to a limit of 12 years on combined service.

Limits on Legislators' Terms in Office
Choice	Votes	%
For	3,081,174	61.02
Against	1,967,888	38.98
Total	5,049,062	100.00
Source: California Secretary of State

=== Proposition 29 ===
Results by county No: 50–60%; 60–70%; 70–80%; Yes: 50–60%; 60–70%; 70–80%

Proposition 29 is an initiative statute that would add a $1 tax on cigarettes to fund cancer research.

Tax on Cigarettes for Cancer Research
Choice	Votes	%
For	2,568,715	49.77
Against	2,592,791	50.23
Total	5,161,506	100.00
Source: California Secretary of State
