= Craig Campbell (politician) =

American politician and businessman (born 1952)

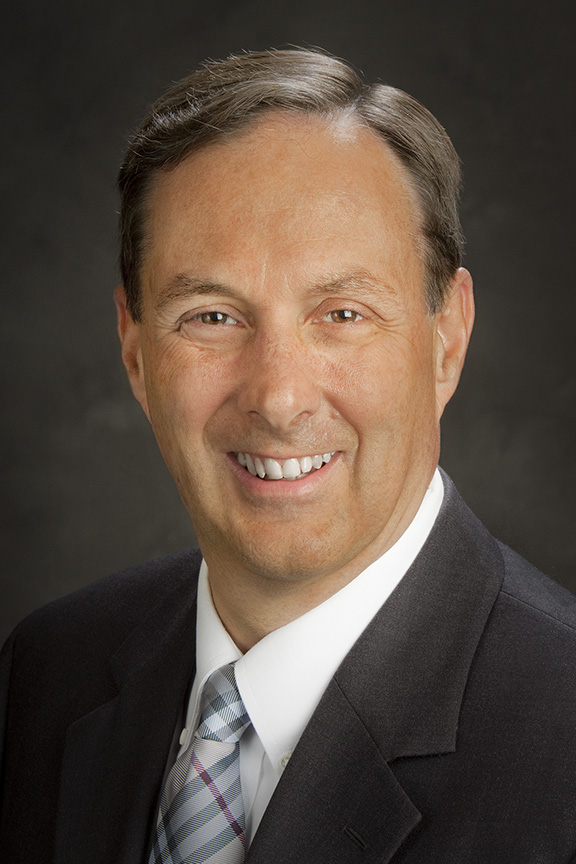
- Official portrait, 2009

10th Lieutenant Governor of Alaska
- In office August 10, 2009 – December 6, 2010
- Governor: Sean Parnell
- Preceded by: Sean Parnell
- Succeeded by: Mead Treadwell

Commissioner of Alaska Department of Military and Veterans Affairs
- In office December 1, 2003 – August 10, 2009
- Governor: Frank Murkowski; Sarah Palin

Member of the Anchorage Assembly from Seat C
- In office October 1986 – April 1996
- Preceded by: Gerry O'Connor
- Succeeded by: Ted Carlson

Personal details
- Born: Craig Eaton Campbell; March 24, 1952 (age 74) Springfield, Massachusetts, U.S.
- Party: Republican
- Spouse: Anne Marie Campbell
- Children: 2
- Education: University of Tulsa (BA); Golden Gate University (MPA); Naval War College (MA)
- Profession: Military officer
- Awards: (3) Air Force Meritorious Service Medal (2) Air Force Commendation Medal; Outstanding Unit Award; Air Force Organizational Excellence Award; National Defense Service Medal (6) Air Force Longevity Service Award; Air Reserve Forces Service Medal; Alaska Distinguished Service Medal; Alaska Commendation Medal; California Medal of Merit

Military service
- Allegiance: United States
- Branch/service: United States Air Force
- Years of service: 1974–2009
- Rank: Lieutenant general (Alaska National Guard); Major general (Air National Guard)

Craig Eaton Campbell (born March 24, 1952) is an American politician and businessman who served as the president and CEO of the Alaska Aerospace Corporation (AAC). He joined the corporation as chief operating officer in February 2011, and was appointed president and CEO by the board of directors in October 2012.

Prior to his position at AAC, Campbell was the tenth lieutenant governor of Alaska, holding the office from August 10, 2009, through December 6, 2010. Pending his confirmation by the State Legislature, he was "temporary substitute" lieutenant governor for several weeks. Campbell left office in December 2010, after having withdrawn from the Republican primary race for lieutenant governor, which was eventually won by Mead Treadwell.

Before serving as lieutenant governor, Campbell was the commissioner of the Alaska Department of Military and Veterans Affairs. In that role, he was head of the state's National Guard, with the rank of lieutenant general. On July 3, 2009, Alaska Governor Sarah Palin announced that she would resign effective July 26. Lieutenant Governor Sean Parnell would become governor, and Campbell would replace Parnell as lieutenant governor. In 2010, Campbell opted to not seek election as lieutenant governor, preferring to return to the business sector and joining AAC in February 2011.

Campbell was appointed the state chair for the Employer Support of the Guard and Reserve (ESGR) Alaska State Committee in October 2012. He is married to wife Anne Marie and has two children: Amanda and Melanie (deceased), and four grandchildren: Faith, Ellie, Kimberly and Emma.

== Early life and education ==
Campbell was born in 1952. He was raised in Longmeadow, Massachusetts, and attended the University of Tulsa in Oklahoma on a Reserve Officer's Training Corp. (ROTC) scholarship, and graduated in 1974 with a Bachelor of Arts degree in political science. In 1999, he earned a Master of Arts degree in national security and strategic studies from the Naval War College at Newport, Rhode Island. During his stay at Vandenberg, he attended classes and earned a Master of Public Administration degree from Golden Gate University in nearby San Francisco, California.

== Career ==
In 1974, Campbell was commissioned a second lieutenant that year and was assigned to the Air Traffic Control Officers Training Course at Keesler Air Force Base in Mississippi.

After being certified as an air traffic controller, he was assigned to Travis Air Force Base in California, then to K. I. Sawyer Air Force Base in Michigan. Each assignment brought a promotion, and he left Sawyer in 1979 as a captain. From Sawyer, he moved to Vandenberg Air Force Base, where he served as chief of air traffic control operations until 1981.

In 1981, he was assigned to Alaska for the first time when he was named the chief of air traffic control operations with the 1930th Communications Squadron at Elmendorf Air Force Base in Anchorage. He left active-duty U.S. Air Force, joined the California Air National Guard, and was assigned duties at Hayward Air National Guard Base in that state in 1984.

In addition, he worked extensively in the private sector, with over 15 years of aviation consulting experience including airport master planning, environmental planning, economic feasibility studies, and facilities location planning—both in the U.S. and internationally.

Campbell has been active in Alaskan politics since the 1980s. He ran for mayor of Anchorage in 1984. He was first elected to the Anchorage Assembly 1986, representing the Chugiak, Eagle River, Birchwood, Peters Creek, Eklutna, and Mountain View sections of Anchorage. The district also included Elmendorf and the other major military base in Anchorage, Fort Richardson (the two have since been combined as Joint Base Elmendorf-Richardson). He subsequently was re-elected in 1989 and 1992, serving twice as Chairman of the Assembly.

In 1991, he joined the Alaska National Guard and became commander of the 168th Resource Management Squadron at Eielson Air Force Base in Alaska. He later was made commander of the 168th Logistics Squadron at the base and was promoted to lieutenant colonel.

In 1994, Campbell again unsuccessfully ran for Mayor of Anchorage, coming in third out of a field of fourteen candidates in the non-partisan, municipality-wide election. He later served on the Matanuska Electric Association Board of Directors from 1996 to 2000, and as an adjunct professor for Embry-Riddle Aeronautical University from 1990 to 2000.

In 1997, he moved into a staff position with the Alaska Air National Guard in Anchorage. In 2000, he was promoted to colonel and named vice commander of the 168th Air Refueling Wing at Eielson. While there, he helped command the wing's operations in support of the American war effort in Afghanistan.

The same year that he was named vice-commander, he became executive director of Anchorage's Office of Planning, Development and Public Works. In 2003, he was selected by then-Alaska governor Frank Murkowski to serve as the state's adjutant general—the commander of the Alaska National Guard—and commissioner of the Alaska Department of Military and Veterans Affairs. Following Palin's election in 2006, he was reconfirmed in his office.

Campbell has 35 years of aerospace experience in the USAF and Alaska National Guard, during which he oversaw the Alaska Army National Guard development of missile defense operations and security missions at Ft. Greely, AK; the relocation of Kulis Air National Guard Base to Joint Base Elmendorf-Richardson; the formation of an associate flying unit between the USAF and Alaska Air National Guard for operations of the C-17 Globemaster III strategic airlift transport; and establishment of a state partnership between the Alaska National Guard and the country of Mongolia.

== Lieutenant governor ==
On July 26, 2009, halfway through her term as governor, Palin resigned. Under the Alaska state constitution, a governor's selection of a new lieutenant governor is subject to confirmation by the State Legislature. The same Constitution, however, gives the governor the power to make "recess appointments", and the Legislature was not in session when Parnell succeeded as governor on July 26. Following Palin's announcement, conflicting statements issued from Alaska legal authorities as to whether Parnell had the authority to appoint a lieutenant governor without approval from the state legislature. The state attorney general stated that while Palin could name Campbell lieutenant governor, it would be preferable to have him sworn in as acting or temporary lieutenant governor, taking the permanent post only upon approval of the legislature. On July 26, after then-Lieutenant Governor Parnell was sworn in as governor, Campbell was given the oath as "temporary substitute" lieutenant governor. The oath was administered by Alaska Supreme Court Justice Daniel Winfree. After coming back into session on August 10, the Legislature confirmed Campbell as lieutenant governor by a vote of 55–4.

Campbell was promoted to lieutenant (three-star) general within the state National Guard by Palin on September 7, 2008. He retained his federal National Guard rank of major (two-star) general until he retired August 31, 2009. Campbell became the president and chief executive officer for Alaska Aerospace Corporation in 2012, retiring in 2020.

Campbell served as the state chair for the Alaska Employer Support of the Guard and Reserve (ESGR) from 2012 until 2017. In 2019, Governor Mike Dunleavy appointed Campbell to the Alaska Railroad Board of Directors.

Campbell currently serves as the RNC National Committeeman for the Alaska Republican Party. He previously served as the ARP Vice Chair.

== See also ==
- Miller v. Campbell

Political offices
Preceded by Sean Parnell	Lieutenant Governor of Alaska; 2009–2010	Succeeded by Mead Treadwell
