= Concord Principles =

American political pledge in 1992

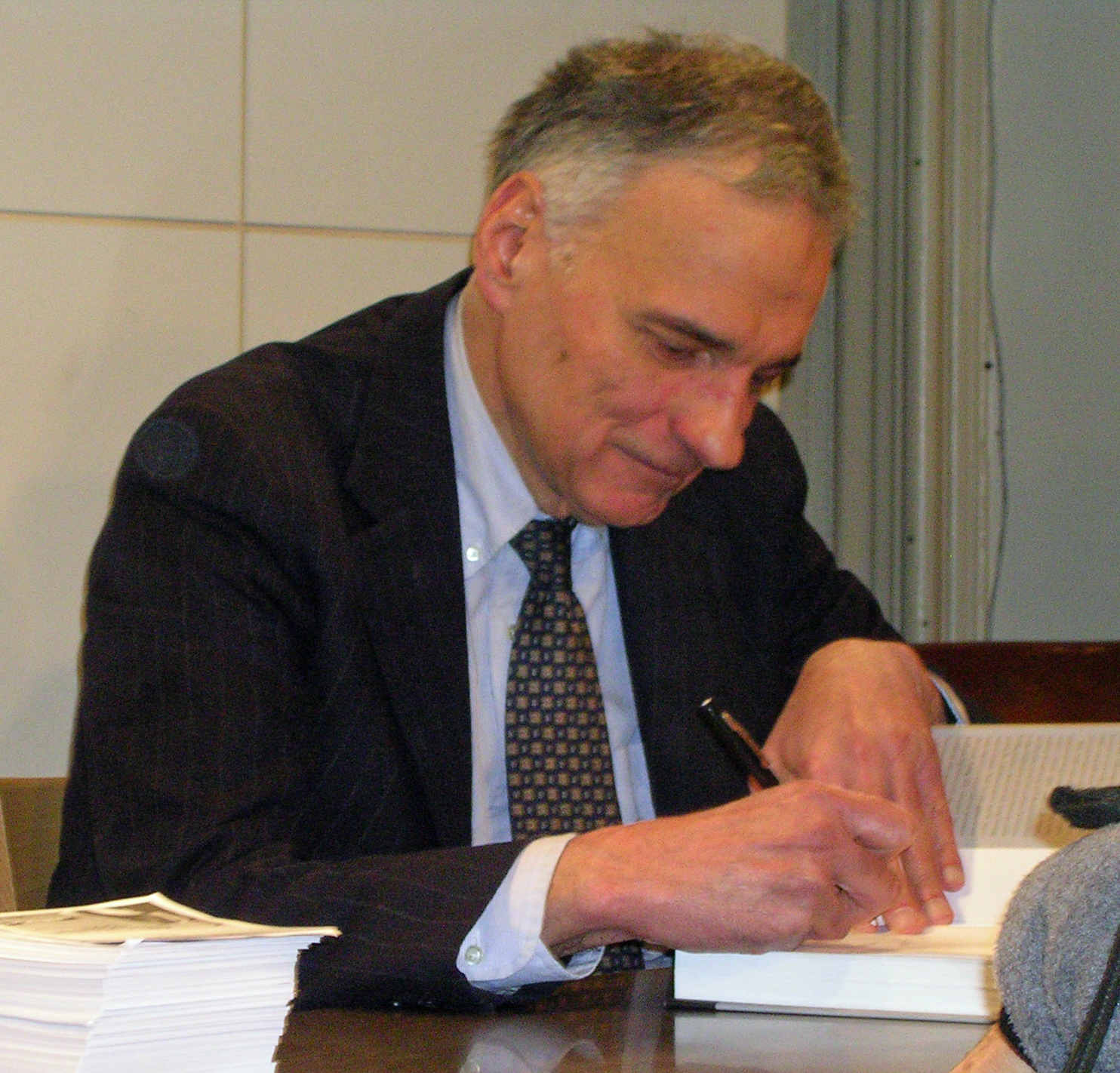
Ralph Nader

Ralph Nader's Concord Principles were offered in 1992 as an invitation to the Presidential candidates to improve civic dialogue and the democratic institutions of the United States.

They are written as 10 pleas intended to avert a trend of corporatism in government, plutocratic influence, banal sloganistic elections, power singularities and a popular sense of political futility in political dialogue.

The list calls for:

- More governmental transparency and civic communication for social consensus.
- More public control over civic assets such as public lands, airwaves and pension funds.
- Strengthened protections from big government and big corporations.
- Democratic protections against nullification of voter powers by:
  - Bold options for "None of the above".
  - 12 year maximum term limits.
  - Improved voter registration and ballot access.
  - Public financing of elections.
  - Binding referendum, initiative and recall powers for state voters and non-binding national referendums.
  - Checks on presidential and congressional pay raises.
- Improved taxpayer oversight of public expenditure.
- Improving the civic information infrastructure through:
  - Computerized government records.
  - Utility company billing as a civic notification process.
  - Expanded public access television.
- Strengthened access to courts to prevent corporate and government abuse.
- Protection for whistleblowers.
- Shareholder protections against corporate greed.
- Strengthening school curriculum in civic participation.

== See also ==
- Collective intelligence
- Concordance system
- Consensus decision making
- Consensus democracy
- Corporatocracy
- Deliberative democracy
- Direct democracy
- Knowledge management
- National initiative, which Nader endorsed
- Public domain
