= Anchorage Assembly =

Governing body of the Municipality of Anchorage, Alaska

Type
- Type: Unicameral

Leadership
- Chair: Anna Brawley

Structure
- Seats: 12
- Political groups: Nonpartisan

Elections
- Last election: April 7, 2026 (6 seats)
- Next election: April 6, 2027 (no Assembly seats)

Website
- Anchorage Assembly website

The Anchorage Assembly is the governing body of Anchorage, Alaska. The Assembly has twelve members elected to three-year terms from six districts. It is responsible for creating and approving the city's annual budget, appropriating municipal funding, and managing elections. Seats in the Assembly are officially nonpartisan.

== Current composition ==
All 12 members are elected from geographic districts. All districts elect two members from designated area.

District	Areas represented	Members	First elected	Term Expires
1	North Anchorage	Sydney Scout	2026	2029
1	North Anchorage	Daniel Volland	2022	2028
2	Chugiak, Eagle River, JBER	Jared Goecker	2025	2028
2	Chugiak, Eagle River, JBER	Donald Handeland	2026	2029
3	West Anchorage	Kameron Perez-Verdia	2019	2028
3	West Anchorage	Anna Brawley	2023	2029
4	Midtown Anchorage	Janice Park	2026	2029
4	Midtown Anchorage	Erin Baldwin Day	2025	2028
5	East Anchorage	George Martinez	2023	2029
5	East Anchorage	Yarrow Silvers	2025	2028
6	South Anchorage, Girdwood, Turnagain Arm	Zac Johnson	2023	2029
6	South Anchorage, Girdwood, Turnagain Arm	Keith McCormick	2025	2028

== Notable former members ==
- Mark Begich, former U.S. senator and mayor of Anchorage
- Chris Birch, former member of the Alaska Legislature
- H. A. Boucher, 2nd lieutenant governor of Alaska
- W. E. Bradley, member of the Alaska Senate
- Craig Campbell, 10th lieutenant governor of Alaska
- Matt Claman, member of the Alaska Senate and former acting mayor of Anchorage
- Eric Croft, former member of the Alaska House of Representatives
- Harriet Drummond, member of the Alaska House of Representatives
- Forrest Dunbar, member of the Alaska Senate
- Fred Dyson, former member of the Alaska Legislature
- Elvi Gray-Jackson, member of the Alaska Senate
- Tony Knowles, 7th governor of Alaska and former mayor of Anchorage
- Suzanne LaFrance, Mayor of Anchorage
- Anna MacKinnon, former member of the Alaska Legislature
- Kevin Meyer, 14th lieutenant governor of Alaska
- Pete Petersen, member of the Alaska House of Representatives
- Austin Quinn-Davidson, acting mayor of Anchorage
- Lidia Selkregg, Italian-American geologist and professor of regional planning
- Arliss Sturgulewski, former member of the Alaska Senate
- Dan Sullivan, former three term Assembly member and two term Mayor of Anchorage
- Charles Wohlforth, author and journalist
- George Wuerch, former mayor of Anchorage
