= 2000 Anchorage mayoral election =

- April 4, 2000 (first round); May 2, 2000 (runoff)
- Turnout: 30.94% (first round); 35.63% (runoff)
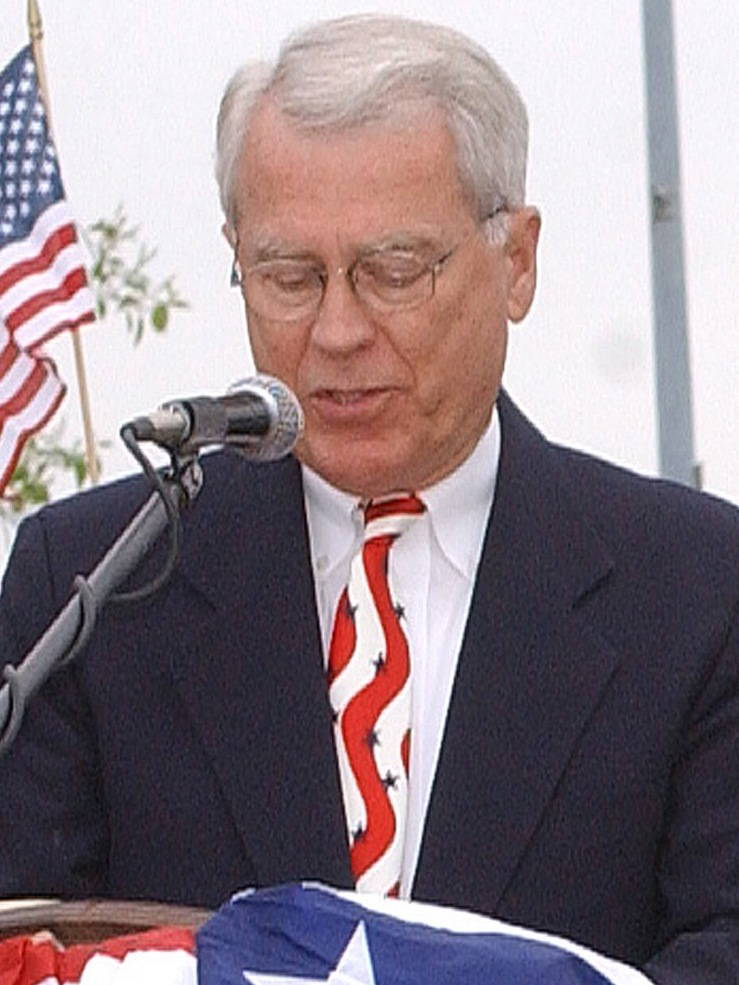

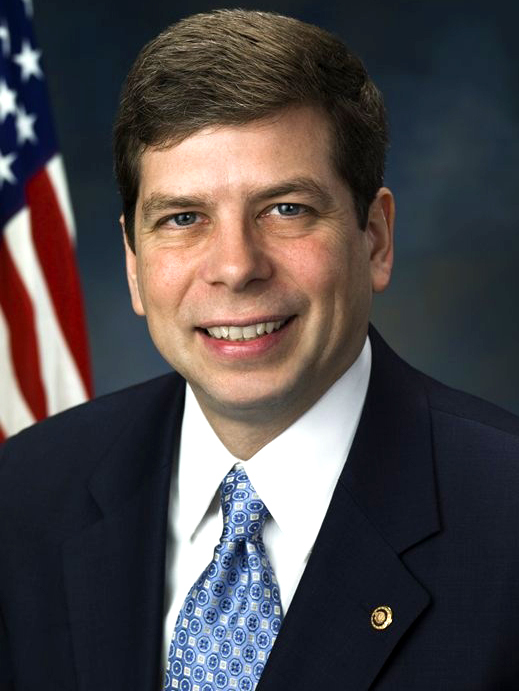

Candidate	George Wuerch	Mark Begich	Jack Frost
First-round vote	12,681	24,920	11,396
First-round percentage	20.49%	40.26%	18.41%
Second-round vote	32,167	20,116
Second-round percentage	52.49%	47.51%
Candidate	Bob Bell
First-round vote	6,034
First-round percentage	9.75%
Mayor before election
Rick Mystrom
Republican
Elected mayor
George Wuerch
Republican

The 2000 Anchorage mayoral election was held on April 4 and May 2, 2000, to elect the mayor of Anchorage, Alaska. It saw election of George Wuerch.

Incumbent mayor Rick Mystrom was term-limited.

Proposition 10, passed in 1999, required mayoral candidates to receive 50% of the votes cast in a race to avoid a runoff. Since no candidate had received a majority of the vote in the first round, a runoff was held between the top-two finishers.

== Results ==
=== First round ===
First round results
Party	Candidate	Votes	%
Nonpartisan	Mark Begich	24,920	40.26
Nonpartisan	George Wuerch	12,681	20.49
Nonpartisan	Jack Frost	11,396	18.41
Nonpartisan	Bob Bell	6,034	9.75
Nonpartisan	Dave Donely	2,744	4.43
Nonpartisan	Pete Kott	2,289	3.70
Nonpartisan	Theresa Nangle Obermeyer	1,178	1.90
Nonpartisan	John Kehr Jr.	90	0.15
Nonpartisan	Race G. Jones	74	0.12
Write-in	Write-ins	91	0.15
Turnout		61,497	30.94

=== Runoff ===
Runoff results
Party	Candidate	Votes	%
Nonpartisan	George Wuerch	32,167	52.49
Nonpartisan	Mark Begich	20,116	47.51
Turnout		69,025	35.63
