= List of first women lawyers and judges in Alaska =

This is a list of the first women lawyer(s) and judge(s) in Alaska. It includes the year in which the women were admitted to practice law (in parentheses). Also included are women who achieved other distinctions such becoming the first in their state to graduate from law school or become a political figure.

== Firsts in Alaska's history ==
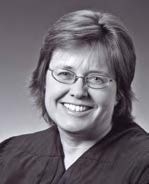
Sharon L. Gleason: First female Judge of the U.S. District Court for the District of Alaska (2012)

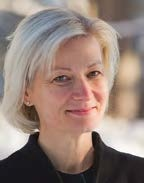
Morgan Christen: First female Judge of the U.S. Court of Appeals for the Ninth Circuit (2012)

=== Lawyers ===
- First female: Nathalena "Natalie" Roberts Moore (1908)
- First African American (female): Mahala Ashley Dickerson (1959)
- First Alaska Native (female) to argue a case before the U.S. Supreme Court: Heather Kendall-Miller in 1998

=== State judges ===
- First (Inupiaq) female magistrate: Sadie Neakok in 1960
- First Alaska Native female (district court): Nora Guinn in 1967
- First females: Dorothy Tyner and Mary Alice Miller in 1968
- First female (Superior Court of Alaska): Beverly Cutler in 1982
- First female (Alaska Supreme Court/Chief Justice): Dana Fabe (1976) beginning in 1996
- First African American female: Pamela Scott Washington (1991) in 2010
- First Asian American female: Jo-Ann Chung in 2011
- First female (Alaska Court of Appeals): Marjorie Allard (1999) in 2012
- First Indian American (female): Una Gandbhir in 2018

=== Federal judges ===
- First female (U.S. District Court for the District of Alaska): Sharon L. Gleason (1984) in 2012
- First female (U.S. Court of Appeals for the Ninth Circuit): Morgan Christen (1986) in 2012

=== Attorney General of Alaska ===
- First female: Grace Berg Schaible (1959) from 1987-1989

=== United States Attorney ===
- First female: Karen L. Loeffler from 2009-2017

=== District Attorney ===
- First female: Catherine Chandler (née Bittner, later Stevens) 1974

=== Alaska Bar Association ===
- First female (president): Donna Willard-Jones from 1979-1980

== Firsts in local history ==
- Dorothy Tyner: First female lawyer in Anchorage, Alaska [Municipality of Anchorage, Alaska]
- Mahala Ashley Dickerson (1959): First African American female lawyer in Anchorage, Alaska [Municipality of Anchorage, Alaska]
- Mary Anne Henry: First female prosecutor in the Anchorage District Attorney's Office (c. 1970s)
- Karen Hunt (1973): First female appointed as a Judge of the Superior Court of Anchorage (1983) [Municipality of Anchorage, Alaska]
- Aline Chenot Baskerville Bradley Beegler (1920): First female lawyer in Fairbanks, Alaska
- Mildred Hermann (1934): First female lawyer in Juneau, Alaska [City and Borough of Juneau, Alaska]
- Angie Kemp: First female District Attorney for the City and Borough of Juneau, Alaska
- Beverly Cutler: First female judge of the Superior Court of Palmer (1982) [Matanuska-Susitna Borough, Alaska]
- Sadie Neakok: First female magistrate in Utqiagvik (Barrow), Alaska (1960)
- Nora Guinn: First Alaska Native female (non-attorney) to serve as a magistrate of Bethel, Alaska (1959)

== See also ==
- List of first women lawyers and judges in the United States
- Timeline of women lawyers in the United States
- Women in law

== Other topics of interest ==
- List of first minority male lawyers and judges in the United States
- List of first minority male lawyers and judges in Alaska
