= S. Lane Tucker =

American lawyer

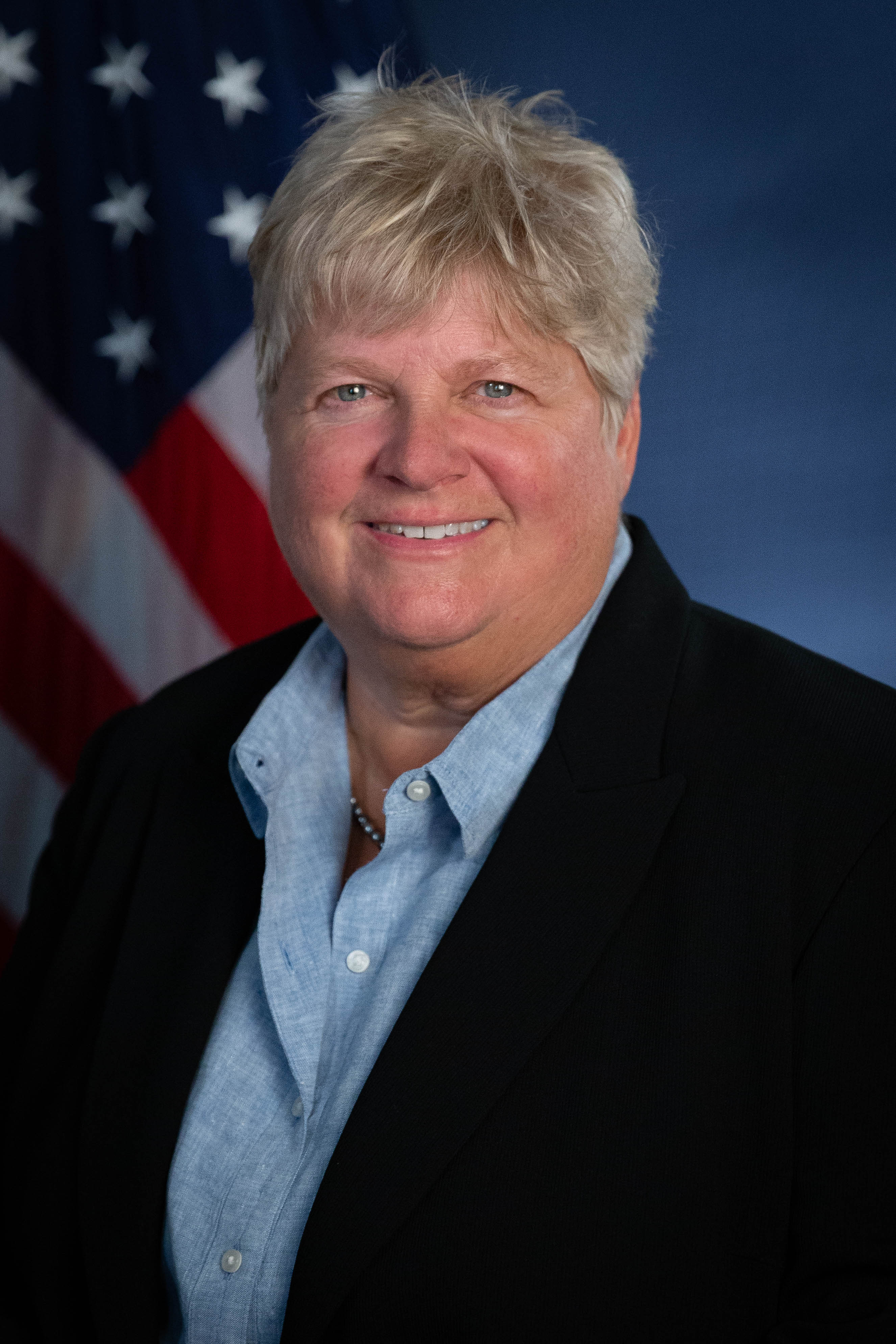

United States Attorney for the District of Alaska
- In office May 31, 2022 – February 8, 2025
- President: Joe Biden; Donald Trump
- Preceded by: Bryan Schroder
- Succeeded by: Michael J. Heyman
- Acting
- In office April 25, 2022 – May 31, 2022

Personal details
- Education: Mary Baldwin College (BA); University of Utah (JD)

S. Lane Tucker is an American lawyer who served as the United States attorney for the District of Alaska from 2022 to 2025.

== Education ==
Tucker received a Bachelor of Arts degree from Mary Baldwin College in 1983 and a Juris Doctor from the S.J. Quinney College of Law at the University of Utah in 1987.

== Career ==
From 1987 to 1991, Tucker served as an assistant general counsel for the General Services Administration. From 1991 to 2002, she was a trial attorney in the United States Department of Justice Civil Division. From 2002 to 2006, she served in the United States Attorney's Office for the District of Alaska, first as an assistant United States attorney from 2002 to 2003 and then as the civil chief from 2003 to 2006. From 2006 to 2008 she was a sole practitioner, and from 2008 to 2009 she was of counsel at Perkins Coie. From 2010 to 2022, she was a partner in the Anchorage office of Stoel Rives.

=== U.S. attorney for the District of Alaska ===
On January 26, 2022, President Joe Biden announced his intent to nominate Tucker to be the United States Attorney for the District of Alaska. On January 31, 2022, her nomination was sent to the United States Senate. On April 25, 2022, Lane was appointed acting U.S. attorney by chief judge Sharon L. Gleason. Her nomination was favorably reported by the Senate Judiciary Committee on May 5, 2022. On May 17, 2022, her nomination was confirmed in the Senate by voice vote. She was sworn in on May 31, 2022. Tucker submitted her resignation as U.S. Attorney effective February 8, 2025.

Legal offices
Preceded by Bryan Schroder	United States Attorney for the District of Alaska; 2022–present	Incumbent
