= List of United States federal courthouses in Alaska =

Following is a list of current and former courthouses of the United States federal court system located in Alaska. Each entry indicates the name of the building along with an image, if available, its location and the jurisdiction it covers, the dates during which it was used for each such jurisdiction, and, if applicable the person for whom it was named, and the date of renaming. Dates of use will not necessarily correspond with the dates of construction or demolition of a building, as pre-existing structures may be adapted for court use, and former court buildings may later be put to other uses. Also, the official name of the building may be changed at some point after its use as a federal court building has been initiated.

== Courthouses ==
Current courthouse locations

Courthouse	City	Image	Street address	Jurisdiction	First used	Last used	Notes
U.S. Federal Building and Courthouse†	Anchorage		605 West Fourth Avenue	D. Alaska	1940	present	Most court functions moved to the newly built federal building on West Seventh Avenue ca. 1979. The U.S. Bankruptcy Court has occupied the building's courtrooms since that time.
James M. Fitzgerald United States Courthouse	Anchorage		222 West Seventh Avenue	D. Alaska	ca. 1979	present	Named after James Martin Fitzgerald.
U.S. Post Office and Courthouse†	Fairbanks		250 Cushman Street	D. Alaska	1958	1977	Now privately owned.
U.S. Federal Building and Courthouse	Fairbanks		101 Twelfth Avenue	D. Alaska	1977	present	
Federal and Territorial Building	Juneau		120 Fourth Street	D. Alaska	1931	ca. 1960	
Hurff Ackerman Saunders Federal Building and Robert Boochever US Courthouse	Juneau		709 West Ninth Street	D. Alaska	1966	present	Named after Hurff Ackerman Saunders and Robert Boochever
Ketchikan Federal Building†	Ketchikan		648 Mission Street	D. Alaska	1938	present	
U.S. Post Office & Court House	Nome		110 Front St, Nome, AK 99762	D. Alaska	1938	1958	Now heavily modified and privately owned.
Post Office Building	Nome		113 Front Street	D. Alaska	?	present	
U.S. Post Office and Courthouse†	Sitka		100 Lincoln Street	D. Alaska	1938	?	

== Key ==
^{†}	Listed on the National Register of Historic Places (NRHP)
^{††}	NRHP-listed and also designated as a National Historic Landmark
