= Judge Fitzgerald =

Judge Fitzgerald may refer to:

- Frank FitzGerald (judge) (1896–1961), judge of the Wayne County Circuit Court
- James Fitzgerald (American jurist, born 1851) (died 1922), judge of the New York Supreme Court
- James Martin Fitzgerald (1920–2011), judge of the United States District Court for the District of Alaska
- Michael W. Fitzgerald (born 1959), judge of the United States District Court for the Central District of California
- Tony Fitzgerald (born 1941), judge of the Federal Court of Australian

== See also ==
- Justice Fitzgerald (disambiguation)
