= Tim Burgess =

Tim Burgess may refer to:

- Tim Burgess (musician) (born 1967), lead singer of British rock band The Charlatans
- Tim Burgess (politician) (born 1949), former mayor of Seattle, former longtime member of the Seattle City Council
- Timothy M. Burgess (born 1956), American federal judge
- Tim Burgess (born 1961), drummer of the pop group T'Pau
