= James Singleton =

James Singleton may refer to:

- James K. Singleton (born 1939), American judge
- James Singleton (basketball) (born 1981), basketball player
- James Singleton (musician) (born 1955), American bassist and member of Astral Project
- Jim Singleton (born 1931), political activist
- James W. Singleton (1811–1892), Representative from Illinois
