= Beverly Cutler =

American lawyer

Beverly Cutler (born September 10, 1949) is an American lawyer who was the first woman to sit on the state Superior Court in Alaska.

== Personal life ==
Cutler was born September 10, 1949 to Lloyd Cutler, the White House Counsel during the administrations of Jimmy Carter and Bill Clinton, and his wife, Louise Winslow Howe Cutler. She grew up outside of Washington, D.C. Cutler, one of four children, had a brother and a sister who also became lawyers. One sister, Louisiana Winslow Cutler, also lives in Alaska.

Cutler attended Yale Law School. Her husband retired as a state trooper to grow potatoes. She has four children and lives in Palmer, Alaska.

== Career ==
In 1974, Cutler moved to Alaska to work as a research attorney for the Alaska Judicial Council. She then went to work as a public defender. Cutler was appointed by Governor Jay Hammond as a district court judge in Anchorage, Alaska and was sworn in on September 26, 1977. At 28 years old, she replaced Dorothy Tyner, who was much older. When first appointed to the bench, Cutler was the only judge in a one-courtroom courthouse. As the court grew, they expanded into a nearby apartment where files were kept in the bathtub.

In 1982, she was appointed the first judge at what is, as of 2012, the Superior Court in Palmer. When she became a superior court judge there was no district court in that jurisdiction, and so the duties of that role were Cutler's as well.

She received criticism after John Pearl Smith II, a prisoner she temporarily released to attend his deceased father's memorial service, escaped and was later recaptured. She also presided over a case involving the mother of Levi Johnston.

Cutler retired in 2009 after spending 32 years as a judge. She was also the superior court's administrative judge. At the end of her career, she served alongside three other judges in Palmer, Alaska, where she presided for 27 years.

== See also ==
- List of first women lawyers and judges in Alaska
