= Justice Fitzgerald =

Justice Fitzgerald may refer to:

== Justices of states of the United States ==
- Adolphus L. Fitzgerald (1840–1921), justice of the Supreme Court of Nevada
- James J. Fitzgerald III (born c. 1942), justice of the Supreme Court of Pennsylvania
- James Martin Fitzgerald (1920–2011), justice of the Alaska Supreme Court
- John Warner Fitzgerald (1924–2006), chief justice of the Michigan Supreme Court
- Thomas R. Fitzgerald (judge) (1941–2015), chief justice of the Illinois Supreme Court
- William F. Fitzgerald (1846–1903), justice of the California Supreme Court

== Lord Justices of Ireland ==
- Maurice FitzGerald, 2nd Lord of Offaly (1194–1257), Lord Chief Justice of Ireland
- Maurice FitzGerald, 1st Earl of Desmond (died 1356), briefly Lord Justice of Ireland
- Robert FitzGerald, 19th Earl of Kildare (1675–1743), Lord Justice of Ireland
- Thomas FitzGerald, 2nd Earl of Kildare (died 1328), Lord Justice of Ireland
- Thomas FitzGerald, 7th Earl of Kildare (1421–1477), Lord Justice of Ireland

== Others ==
- Tony Fitzgerald (born 1941), justice of the Supreme Court of Queensland
- William James Fitzgerald (jurist) (1894–1989), chief justice of Palestine during the time of the British Mandate

== See also ==
- Judge Fitzgerald (disambiguation)
