= Andrew Kleinfeld =

American judge (1945–2025)

Senior Judge of the United States Court of Appeals for the Ninth Circuit
- In office June 12, 2010 – November 7, 2025

Judge of the United States Court of Appeals for the Ninth Circuit
- In office September 16, 1991 – June 12, 2010
- Appointed by: George H. W. Bush
- Preceded by: Alfred Goodwin
- Succeeded by: Morgan Christen

Judge of the United States District Court for the District of Alaska
- In office May 15, 1986 – October 7, 1991
- Appointed by: Ronald Reagan
- Preceded by: Seat established
- Succeeded by: John W. Sedwick

Personal details
- Born: Andrew Jay Kleinfeld; June 12, 1945 New York City, New York, U.S.
- Died: November 7, 2025 (aged 80)
- Spouse: Judith Smilg
- Education: Wesleyan University (BA); Harvard University (JD)

Andrew Jay Kleinfeld (June 12, 1945 – November 7, 2025) was an American lawyer and jurist who served as a United States circuit judge of the United States Court of Appeals for the Ninth Circuit. He served as an active judge on the Ninth Circuit from 1991 to 2010. Kleinfeld was previously a United States district judge on the United States District Court for the District of Alaska from 1986 to 1991.

== Background ==
Kleinfeld graduated from Wesleyan University in 1966 with a Bachelor of Arts. He then attended Harvard Law School, graduating in 1969 with a Juris Doctor.

After graduating from law school, Kleinfeld was a law clerk to justice Jay Rabinowitz of the Alaska Supreme Court from 1969 to 1971. He then entered private practice in Fairbanks, also serving from 1971 to 1974 as a part-time United States magistrate judge for Alaska's U.S. District Court.

Kleinfeld was married to Judith (Smilg) Kleinfeld, a professor at the University of Alaska Fairbanks. His family is Jewish. Kleinfeld died on November 7, 2025, at the age of 80.

=== Federal judicial service ===
Kleinfeld was nominated to a seat on the United States District Court for the District of Alaska by President Ronald Reagan on March 26, 1986. He was confirmed by the United States Senate on May 14, 1986, and received his commission on May 15, 1986. His service terminated on October 7, 1991, due to elevation to the court of appeals.

On May 23, 1991, President George H. W. Bush nominated Kleinfeld to a seat on the United States Court of Appeals for the Ninth Circuit, vacated by Judge Alfred Goodwin. He was confirmed by the Senate on September 12, 1991, and received his commission on September 16, 1991. He assumed senior status on June 12, 2010. His judicial service was terminated upon his death in November 2025.

=== Notable cases ===
==== Involvement in Wal-Mart discrimination case ====
In 2007, a Ninth Circuit panel affirmed the class action certification in Dukes v. Wal-Mart Stores, Inc., a lawsuit initiated by female employees of Wal-Mart against the company for gender discrimination. Kleinfeld wrote a sharply worded dissent, saying "this case poses a considerable risk of enriching undeserving class members and counsel, but depriving thousands of women actually injured by sex discrimination of their just due."

==== Free speech ====
Kleinfeld was the author of the unanimous panel decision of Morse v. Frederick, holding that a student who put up a banner supposedly supporting drug legalization was exercising his freedom of speech protected by the First Amendment, and the school principal acted unconstitutionally in suspending him. The school board appealed the decision to the Supreme Court, which heard the case on March 19, 2007.

The Supreme Court, in a 2007 majority opinion authored by Chief Justice John Roberts, reversed Kleinfeld's ruling and ruled that the First Amendment does not protect in-school student speech advocating illegal drug use. One key point of disagreement between Judge Kleinfeld's opinion and Chief Justice Roberts' was whether the speech was at or during school. As the banner was displayed across the street from the school (which had been let out for the day), Judge Kleinfeld's panel held that it was an "out of school" activity. Chief Justice Roberts' majority disagreed.

== See also ==
- List of Jewish American jurists

Legal offices
New seat	Judge of the United States District Court for the District of Alaska; 1986–1991	Succeeded by John W. Sedwick
Preceded by Alfred Goodwin	Judge of the United States Court of Appeals for the Ninth Circuit; 1991–2010	Succeeded by Morgan Christen
