= Ralph Beistline =

American judge (born 1948)

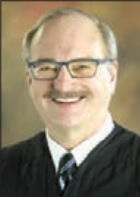

Senior Judge of the United States District Court for the District of Alaska
- Incumbent
- Assumed office December 31, 2015

Chief Judge of the United States District Court for the District of Alaska
- In office 2009 – December 31, 2015
- Preceded by: John W. Sedwick
- Succeeded by: Timothy M. Burgess

Judge of the United States District Court for the District of Alaska
- In office March 19, 2002 – December 31, 2015
- Appointed by: George W. Bush
- Preceded by: H. Russel Holland
- Succeeded by: Joshua Kindred

Personal details
- Born: Ralph Robert Beistline; December 6, 1948 (age 77) Fairbanks, Alaska
- Education: University of Alaska Fairbanks (BA); Seattle University (JD)

Ralph Robert Beistline (born December 6, 1948) is a senior United States district judge of the United States District Court for the District of Alaska.

== Education and career ==
Born in Fairbanks, Alaska, Beistline received a Bachelor of Arts degree from the University of Alaska Fairbanks in 1972 and a Juris Doctor from the University of Puget Sound School of Law (now Seattle University School of Law) in 1974. He was a law clerk to three judges on the Superior Court in Fairbanks from 1974 to 1975, and was thereafter in private practice in Alaska from 1975 to 1992, when he was appointed a judge on the Alaska Superior Court.

== District court service ==
Beistline was nominated by President George W. Bush on November 8, 2001, to a seat on the United States District Court for the District of Alaska vacated by H. Russel Holland. He was confirmed by the United States Senate on March 12, 2002, and received his commission on March 19, 2002. He was the chief judge from 2009 to 2015. He assumed senior status on December 31, 2015.

== Sources ==
Legal offices
Preceded by H. Russel Holland	Judge of the United States District Court for the District of Alaska; 2002–2015	Succeeded by Joshua Kindred
Preceded by John W. Sedwick	Chief Judge of the United States District Court for the District of Alaska; 2009–2015	Succeeded by Timothy M. Burgess
