= Melville C. Brown =

American politician and judge

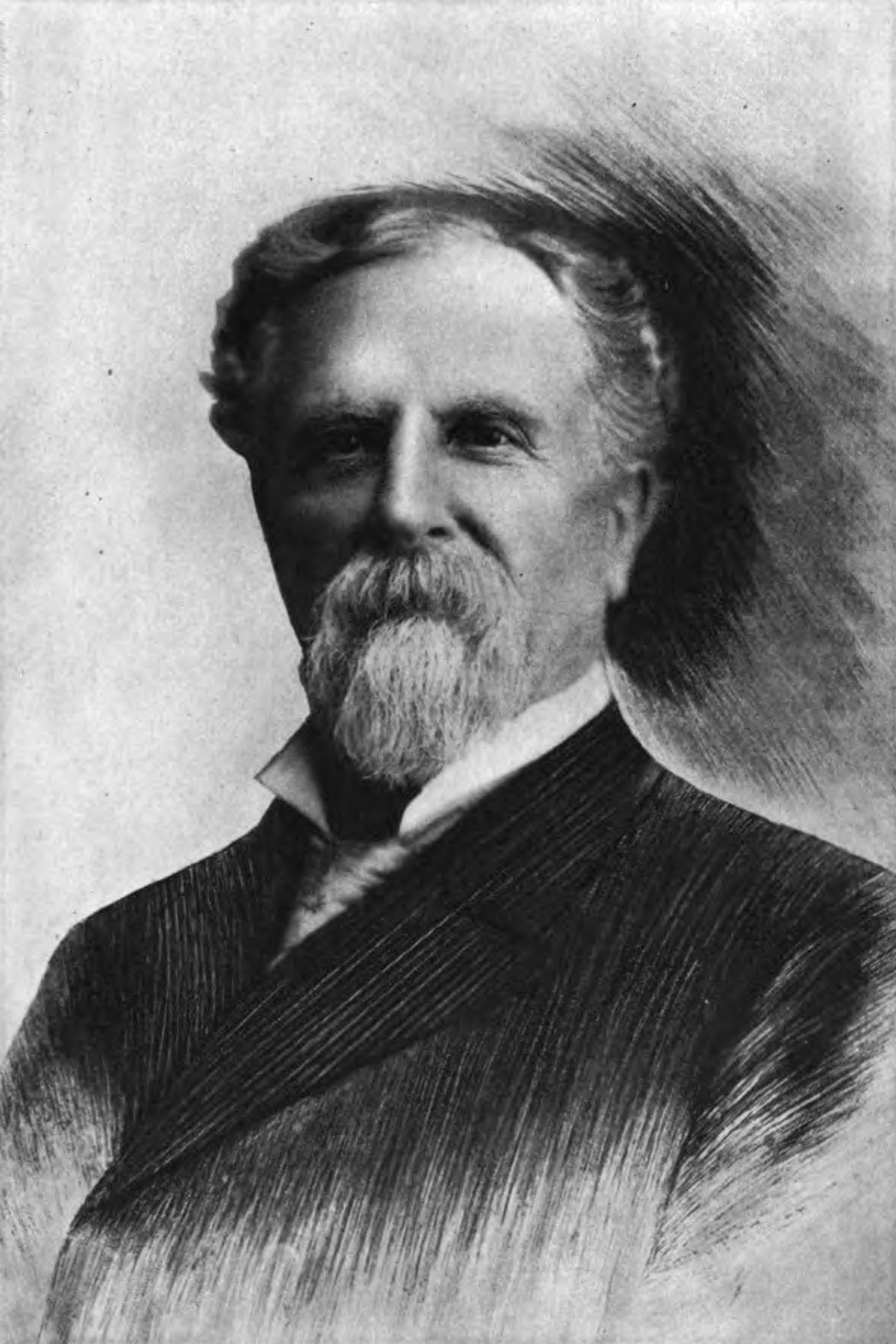

Judge of the United States Territorial District Court for the District of Alaska
- In office 1900–1904
- Appointed by: William McKinley
- Preceded by: Charles S. Johnson
- Succeeded by: Royal Arch Gunnison

U.S. Attorney for the Territorial District of Wyoming
- In office 1880–1884

Member of the Wyoming Territorial House of Representatives
- In office 1871–1872

Member of the Idaho Territorial House of Representatives
- In office 1863–1864
- Constituency: Boise County

Personal details
- Born: August 16, 1838 Kennebec County, Maine, U.S.
- Died: April 9, 1928 (aged 89) Laramie, Wyoming, U.S.
- Party: Republican
- Spouse: Nancy W. Fillmore (m. 1874)
- Children: 3
- Profession: Attorney

Melville Cox Brown (August 16, 1838 – April 9, 1928) was an American politician and jurist.

== Biography ==
Brown was born on August 16, 1838, on a farm in Kennebec County, Maine, near Augusta, the son of Captain Enoch and Sarah S. (née Reed) Brown, the former supposedly a descendent of Mayflower passenger Peter Browne. He grew up in Maine before heading West at eighteen, settling in Oroville, California, before moving to Florence, Idaho Territory, in 1862. The following year, he moved to Centerville, where he studied law under a Judge Kelley, and was elected as a Republican to represent Boise County in the Idaho Territorial House of Representatives. Brown was then appointed by President Lincoln as assistant assessor of internal revenue for the territory, and became assessor when his superior, Calvin Bodfish, died.

After having success as a mining investor, Brown relocated to Cheyenne, Dakota Territory, in 1867, to practice law. The following year, he moved his practice to Laramie, Wyoming Territory, which would remain his home for most of the following sixty years. He married Nancy W. Fillmore in Laramie on May 20, 1870, and they would have three daughters. That same year, he was elected as chairman of the Wyoming Territorial Republican Party, and in 1871, he was elected to the Wyoming Territorial House of Representatives. He would later serve as the first mayor of Laramie and district attorney for Albany County. In 1880, he was appointed as U.S. Attorney for the Territorial District of Wyoming, which he would serve as for four years. In 1889, he was chosen as a delegate to the Wyoming Constitutional Convention, which elected him as its president.

Brown practiced law throughout the West, and on March 6, 1900, President William McKinley nominated him as the U.S. Territorial District Judge for the District of Alaska, to which he was confirmed by the United States Senate on the 13th. Once there, he heard cases in Sitka and Wrangell. He term expired in 1904 and he practiced law in Seattle until 1907, returning the following year to Laramie, where he practiced law until his retirement. While he was successful in his law practice, his business ventures were generally unsuccessful, and upon his death due to heart failure in Laramie on April 9, 1928, he left an estate valued at $2,500.

Political offices
Preceded by Charles S. Johnson	Justice of the Alaska Territorial District Court; 1900–1904	Succeeded by Royal Arch Gunnison
