= H. Russel Holland =

American judge (born 1936)

Hezekiah Holland
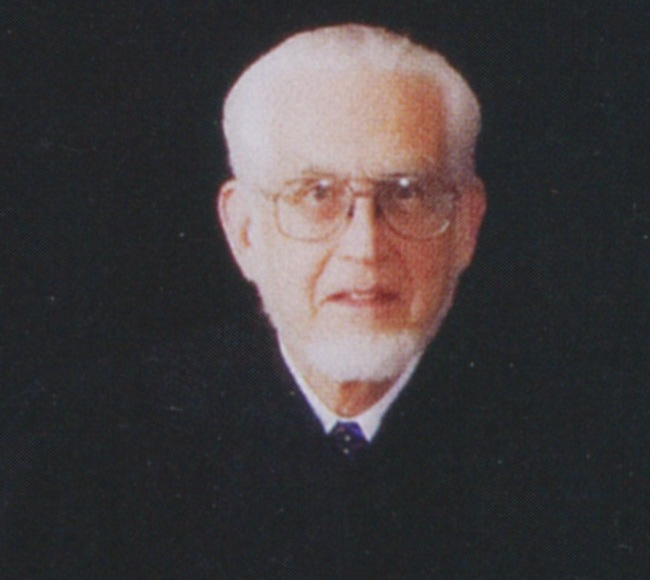
- Holland c. 2010

Senior Judge of the United States District Court for the District of Alaska
- Incumbent
- Assumed office September 18, 2001

Chief Judge of the United States District Court for the District of Alaska
- In office 1989–1995
- Preceded by: James Martin Fitzgerald
- Succeeded by: James K. Singleton

Judge of the United States District Court for the District of Alaska
- In office July 16, 1984 – September 18, 2001
- Appointed by: Ronald Reagan
- Preceded by: James von der Heydt
- Succeeded by: Ralph Beistline

Personal details
- Born: Hezekiah Russel Holland; 1936 Pontiac, Michigan, United States
- Children: As of 1984, 3, including Ky
- Education: University of Michigan (BBA, LLB)

Hezekiah Russel Holland (born 1936) is an American lawyer who serves as a senior United States district judge on the United States District Court for the District of Alaska.

== Education and career ==
Born in Pontiac, Michigan, Holland received a bachelor's degree from the University of Michigan in 1958 and a Bachelor of Laws from the University of Michigan Law School in 1961. He was a law clerk to Buell A. Nesbett, chief justice of the Alaska Supreme Court, from 1961 to 1963. He was an Assistant United States Attorney of the Anchorage, Alaska division from 1963 to 1965. He then entered private practice at Stevens & Savage, the law firm of future U.S. Senator Ted Stevens. Holland became a partner in the firm and its name was changed to Stevens, Savage, Holland, Reasor, and Erwin in 1967. The firm became Stevens and Holland in 1968. He was in private practice from 1968 to 1970. He was a partner at Holland and Thornton from 1970 to 1978. The firm became Holland, Thornton and Trefry in 1978 and Holland and Thornton again later that year. Holland remained there until he was appointed to the bench in 1984.

As of 1984, he was married and had three children.

== Federal judicial service ==
On March 6, 1984, Holland was nominated by President Ronald Reagan to a seat on the United States District Court for the District of Alaska vacated by Judge James von der Heydt. Holland was confirmed by the United States Senate on March 26, 1984, and received his commission on July 16, 1984. He served as Chief Judge from 1989 to 1995, assuming senior status on September 18, 2001.

Holland serves as a visiting judge in the District of Arizona, having first presided over a case in that court in 1993. He has heard 835 cases in the District of Arizona. Notable trials he handled were 2014's United States v. Town of Colorado City, Ariz., et al., in which the local government was controlled by leaders from FLDS sect of Mormonism, and consolidated Theranos litigation (Toy v. Theranos, Inc., et al.) from October 2016 until June 2020 when he requested it be reassigned.

== Notable cases ==
Holland presided over the litigation ensuing after the Exxon Valdez disaster.

He was formerly (until June 2020) the presiding judge in a class action lawsuit against Theranos founder Elizabeth Holmes.

== Association ==
Holland is a member of the Petroleum Club, a social organization that has many members associated with the oil industry.

== Sources ==
Legal offices
Preceded by James von der Heydt	Judge of the United States District Court for the District of Alaska; 1984–2001	Succeeded by Ralph Beistline
Preceded by James Martin Fitzgerald	Chief Judge of the United States District Court for the District of Alaska; 1989–1995	Succeeded by James K. Singleton
