= Michael J. Heyman =

U.S. Attorney for the District of Alaska

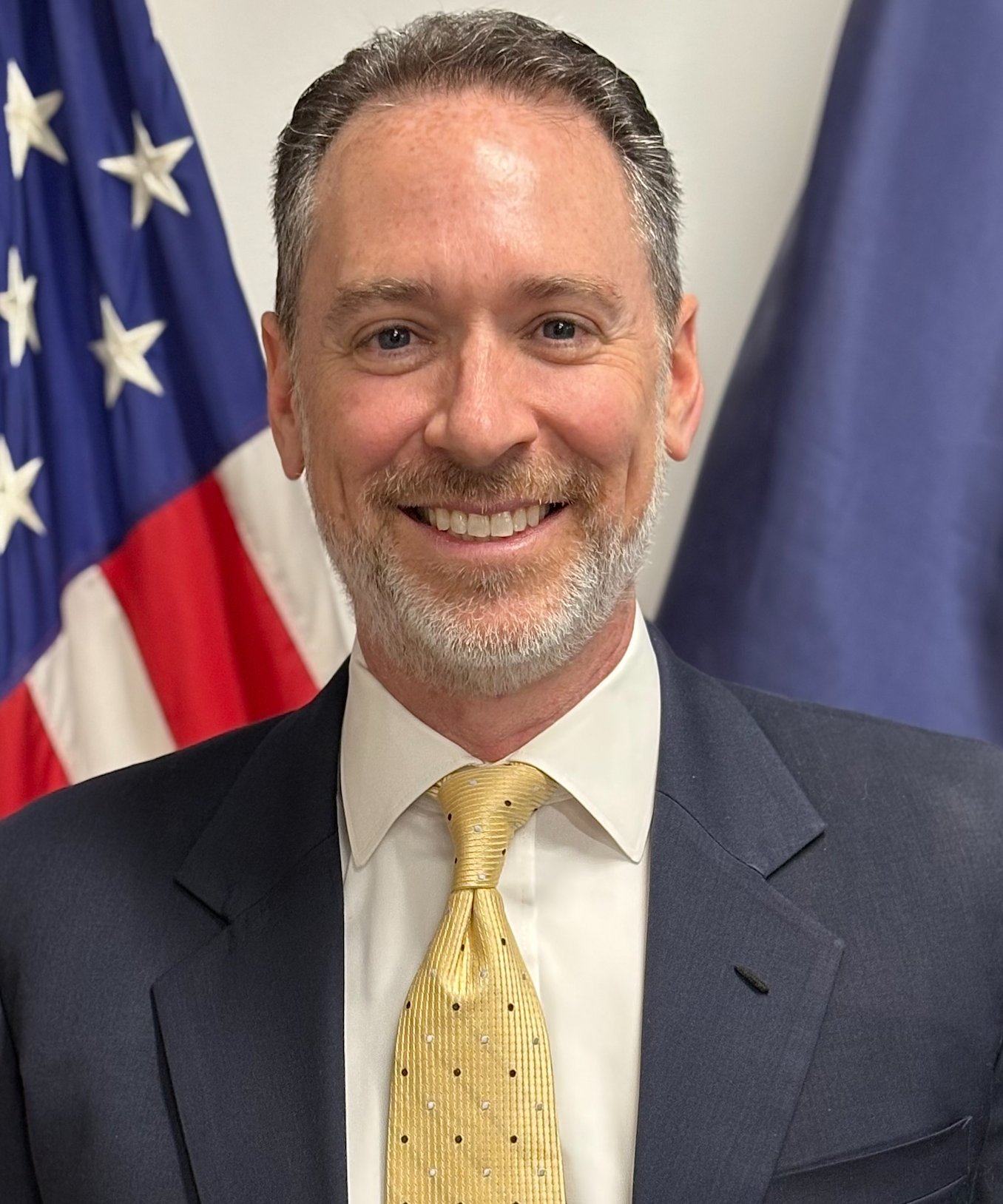
- M. Heyman in 2025

United States Attorney for the District of Alaska
- Incumbent
- Assumed office March 3, 2025; Interim: March 3, 2025 – June 26, 2025
- President: Donald Trump
- Preceded by: S. Lane Tucker

Personal details
- Occupation: Lawyer

Michael J. Heyman is an American lawyer who serves as the United States Attorney for the District of Alaska. He was appointed by Attorney General Pam Bondi on February 28, 2025, and sworn in on March 3, 2025, to a 120-day interim term pending presidential nomination and Senate confirmation. After the interim period expired, his authority was extended by order of the United States District Court for the District of Alaska.

== Career ==
Heyman joined the United States Department of Justice in 2012 as an Assistant United States Attorney in the Southern District of California. According to subsequent reporting, he later served as a resident legal advisor at United States embassies in Nepal and Sri Lanka, working on rule-of-law and transnational crime issues, and he previously practiced in the private sector as a partner at the international law firm K&L Gates, where his work focused on commercial litigation and insolvency.

Heyman joined the U.S. Attorney’s Office for the District of Alaska in 2020, with reporting describing him as a veteran financial-crimes prosecutor who had already worked for several years on complex financial investigations in the office.

== United States Attorney for the District of Alaska ==
=== Appointment ===
On February 28, 2025, Bondi appointed Heyman interim United States Attorney for the District of Alaska. He was sworn in on March 3, 2025, by U.S. District Judge Timothy M. Burgess. Under federal law, his interim appointment was limited to 120 days, after which the judges of the district court issued General Order 25-04 to extend his service while the position remained vacant.

Analyses of Trump administration justice-department staffing have listed Heyman among the interim U.S. Attorneys appointed during the administration’s second term, noting his previous service as a career federal prosecutor in California and Alaska before taking the top role in the district.

=== Notable cases and initiatives ===
Independent coverage has linked Heyman’s tenure to several high-profile federal cases and enforcement initiatives in Alaska.

==== Financial-crime prosecutions ====
Prior to his appointment as U.S. Attorney, Heyman worked on complex financial-crime cases in Alaska, and later reporting on his appointment highlighted earlier prosecutions involving large-scale investment fraud and health-care-related offenses. In one widely covered case, Anchorage investment adviser Garrett Elder was sentenced to ten years in prison for a multimillion-dollar Ponzi-style scheme that defrauded more than 170 investors; coverage of the case identified the U.S. Attorney’s Office in Alaska as treating it as one of the state’s most significant fraud prosecutions.

The same Real News Now profile on Heyman’s appointment noted that he had also overseen the prosecution of Eagle River nurse practitioner Jessica Spayd, who received a lengthy federal sentence after being convicted of unlawfully prescribing opioids that contributed to multiple patient deaths.

==== Operation Take Back America and violent crime ====
In June 2025, Must Read Alaska reported that the Justice Department announced criminal charges against 39 defendants in Alaska as part of “Operation Take Back America,” a national initiative targeting violent crime, drug trafficking, and transnational criminal organizations. As U.S. Attorney, Heyman announced the Alaska component of the operation and described it as part of a broader effort to address violent crime and drug trafficking in the state.

That initiative was later connected to a federal case involving the Chelsea Inn Hotel in Anchorage. In August 2025, Alaska Public Media reported that the owner and an employee of the hotel were charged with using the property as a base for drug-trafficking activity, citing Heyman’s comments at a press conference that the hotel had allegedly been used to store and distribute narcotics and to facilitate other criminal conduct.

==== Cybercrime ====
Heyman’s office has also been involved in cybercrime prosecutions brought jointly with other districts. In August 2025, technology outlet The Register reported that federal authorities dismantled “RapperBot,” described as one of the world’s largest distributed-denial-of-service-for-hire botnets, and identified the District of Alaska among the U.S. Attorneys’ offices participating in the prosecution.

==== Outreach and public-safety work in rural Alaska ====
Heyman has appeared at public events focused on public safety in rural and Alaska Native communities. In May 2025, Western Alaska radio station KNOM reported that he spoke at a march in Nome highlighting the issue of Missing and Murdered Indigenous People, emphasizing the need for federal, state, and local entities to work together “to see that justice is served.”
