= Walter Hartman Hodge =

American judge (1896–1975)

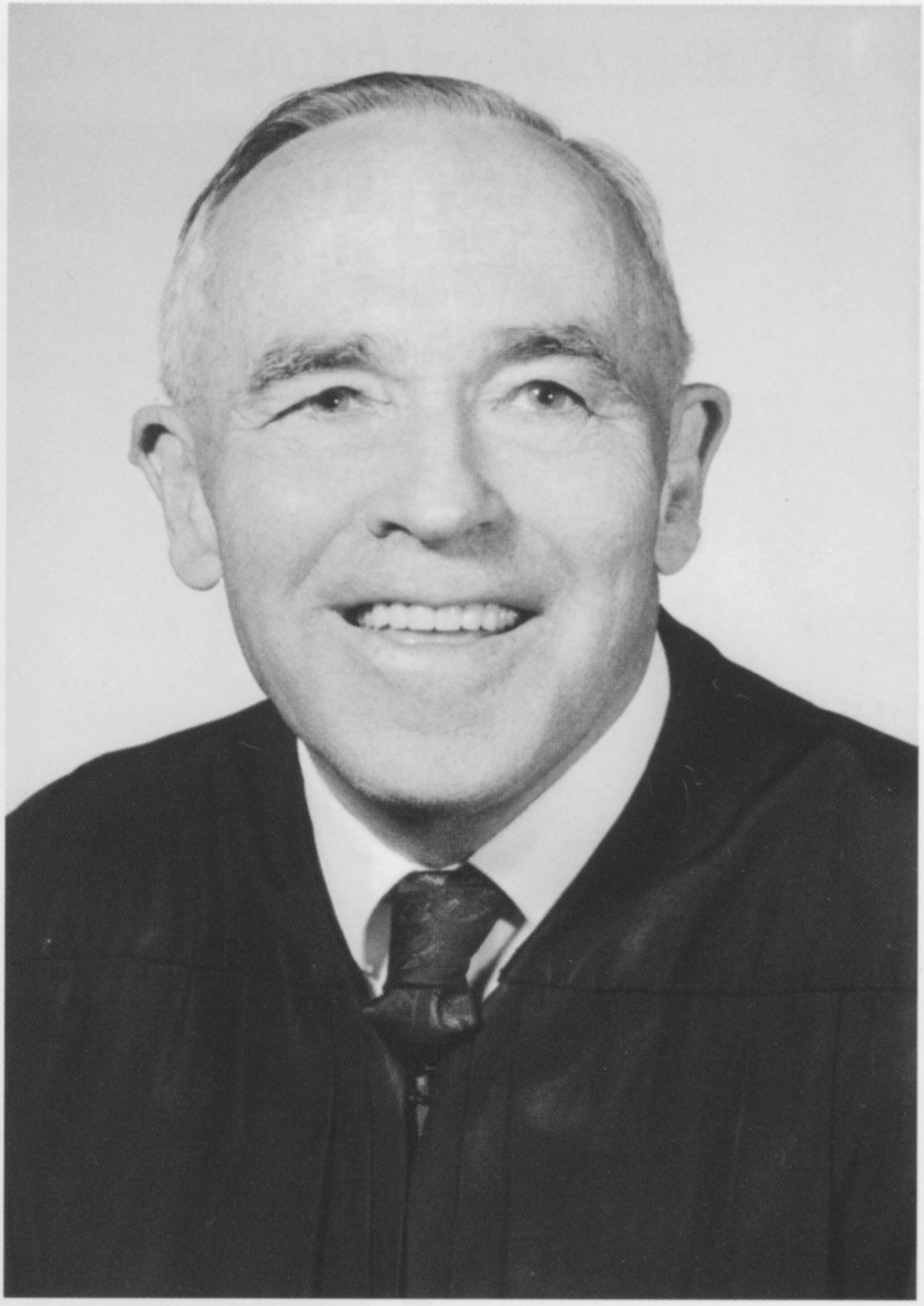

Senior Judge of the United States District Court for the District of Alaska
- In office August 30, 1966 – July 12, 1975

Chief Judge of the United States District Court for the District of Alaska
- In office 1961–1966
- Preceded by: Office established
- Succeeded by: Raymond Eugene Plummer

Judge of the United States District Court for the District of Alaska
- In office February 19, 1960 – August 30, 1966
- Appointed by: Dwight D. Eisenhower
- Preceded by: Seat established by 72 Stat. 399
- Succeeded by: James von der Heydt

Personal details
- Born: Walter Hartman Hodge; August 29, 1896 Auburn, Indiana
- Died: July 12, 1975 (aged 78)
- Education: University of Washington School of Law (LL.B.)

Walter Hartman Hodge (August 29, 1896 – July 12, 1975) was a United States district judge of the United States District Court for the District of Alaska.

== Education and career ==
Born in Auburn, Indiana, Hodge received a bachelor of laws from University of Washington School of Law in 1919. He was a law clerk for the Washington Supreme Court from 1919 to 1920. He was in private practice of law in Wenatchee, Washington in 1921. He was a deputy prosecuting attorney of Skagit County, Washington from 1921 to 1924. He was in private practice of law in Seattle, Washington from 1925 to 1926. He was an assistant United States attorney for the District of Alaska Territory from 1926 to 1929. He was in private practice in Seattle from 1929 to 1934. He was in private practice in Cordova, Territory of Alaska from 1934 to 1954. He was a judge of the United States District Court for the District of Alaska Territory from 1954 to 1959. He was an associate justice of the Alaska Supreme Court from 1959 to 1960.

== Federal judicial service ==
Hodge was nominated by President Dwight D. Eisenhower on January 14, 1960, to the United States District Court for the District of Alaska, to a new seat created by 72 Stat. 339. He was confirmed by the United States Senate on February 18, 1960, and received commission on February 19, 1960. He served as chief judge from 1961 to 1966. He assumed senior status on August 30, 1966. His service was terminated on July 12, 1975, due to his death.

== Sources ==
Legal offices
Preceded by Seat established by 72 Stat. 399	Judge of the United States District Court for the District of Alaska; 1960–1966	Succeeded by James von der Heydt
Preceded by Office established	Chief Judge of the United States District Court for the District of Alaska; 1961–1966	Succeeded by Raymond Eugene Plummer
