= John W. Sedwick =

American judge (born 1946)

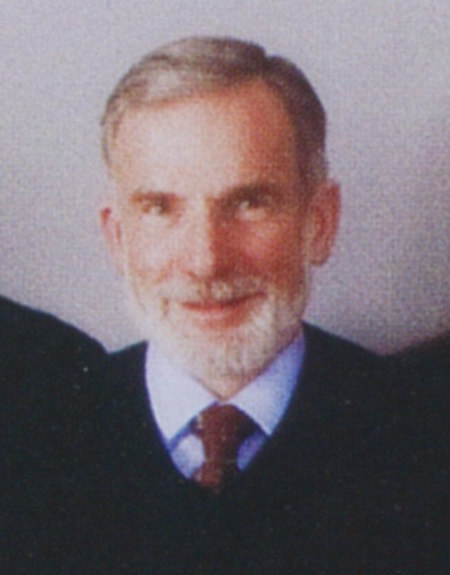

Senior Judge of the United States District Court for the District of Alaska
- Incumbent
- Assumed office March 13, 2011

Chief Judge of the United States District Court for the District of Alaska
- In office 2002–2009
- Preceded by: James K. Singleton
- Succeeded by: Ralph Beistline

Judge of the United States District Court for the District of Alaska
- In office October 9, 1992 – March 13, 2011
- Appointed by: George H. W. Bush
- Preceded by: Andrew Kleinfeld
- Succeeded by: Sharon L. Gleason

Personal details
- Born: John W. Sedwick; March 13, 1946 (age 80) Kittanning, Pennsylvania
- Education: Dartmouth College (BA); Harvard University (JD)

John W. Sedwick (born March 13, 1946) is a senior United States district judge of the United States District Court for the District of Alaska.

== Education and career ==
Sedwick was born in 1946 in Kittanning, Pennsylvania. He attended Dartmouth College in Hanover, New Hampshire where he received a Bachelor of Arts degree in 1968. He then served in the United States Air Force as a sergeant from 1969 to 1971. He graduated with a Juris Doctor degree from Harvard Law School in Cambridge, Massachusetts in 1972. He went into private practice in Anchorage, Alaska from 1972 to 1981. He served as the director of the Division of Land and Water Management of the Department of Natural Resources for the state from 1981 to 1982. He returned to private practice from 1982 to 1992.

== Federal judicial service ==
Sedwick was nominated by President George H. W. Bush on July 2, 1992, to the United States District Court for the District of Alaska, to a seat vacated by Judge Andrew Kleinfeld. He was confirmed by the United States Senate on October 8, 1992, and received his commission on October 9, 1992. He served as chief judge from 2002 to 2009. On March 13, 2011, John W. Sedwick assumed senior status. He was succeeded by Judge Sharon L. Gleason.

== Sources ==
Legal offices
Preceded by Andrew Kleinfeld	Judge of the United States District Court for the District of Alaska; 1992–2011	Succeeded by Sharon L. Gleason
Preceded by James K. Singleton	Chief Judge of the United States District Court for the District of Alaska; 2002–2009	Succeeded by Ralph Beistline
