= Aaron C. Peterson =

American judge (born 1981)

Aaron Christian Peterson
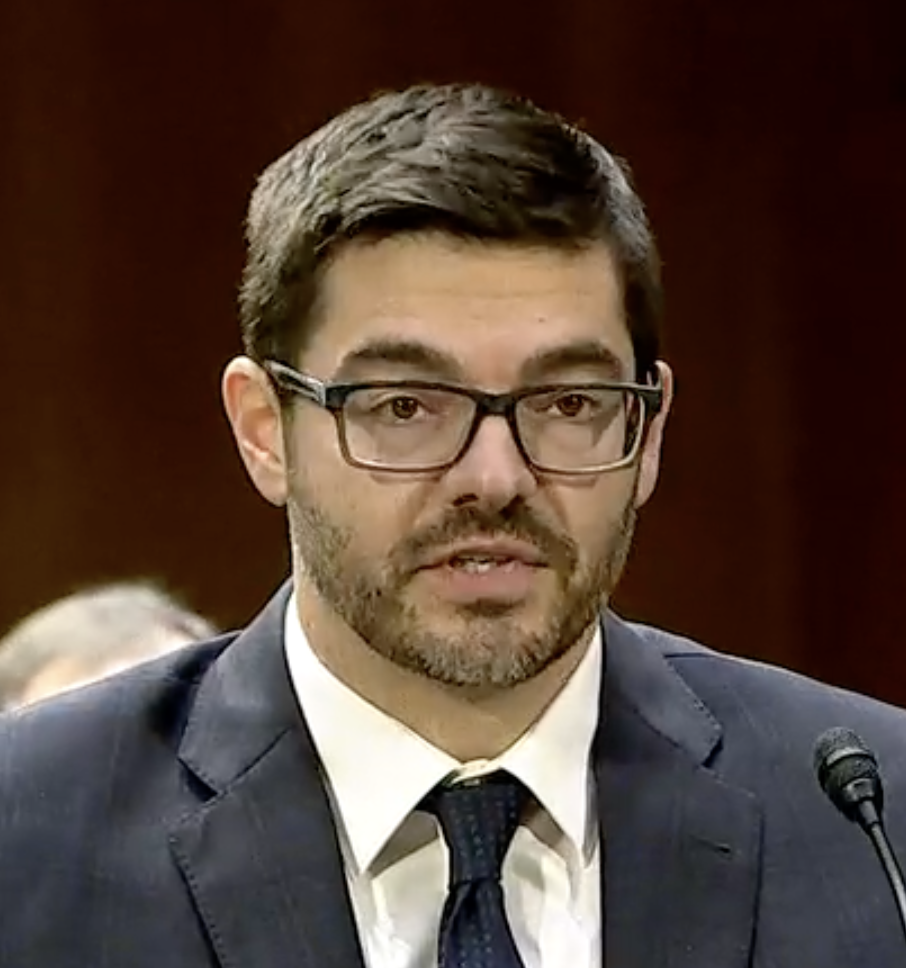

Judge of the United States District Court for the District of Alaska
- Incumbent
- Assumed office February 10, 2026
- Appointed by: Donald Trump
- Preceded by: Timothy M. Burgess

Personal details
- Born: 1981 (age 44–45) Anchorage, Alaska, U.S.
- Education: University of Alaska Anchorage (BBA); Gonzaga University (JD)

Aaron Christian Peterson (born 1981) is an American lawyer who has served as a United States district judge of the United States District Court for the District of Alaska since 2026. He served as senior assistant attorney general in the Alaska Department of Law from 2019 to 2026.

== Early life and education ==
Peterson was born in 1981 in Anchorage, Alaska. He served as an enlisted airman in the United States Air Force, before graduating from the University of Alaska Anchorage in 2007 with a Bachelor of Business Administration degree, cum laude, and from the Gonzaga University School of Law in 2010 with a Juris Doctor.

== Career ==
From 2010 to 2011, Peterson served as a law clerk for Judge Michael R. Spaan of the Alaska Superior Court. From 2011 to 2012, he served as an assistant municipal prosecutor in the Anchorage Municipal Prosecutor's Office. From 2012 to 2015, he served as an assistant district attorney in the Anchorage District Attorney's Office. From 2015 to 2019, he served as an assistant attorney general in the Alaska Department of Law, Criminal Division. From 2019 to 2026, he served as a senior assistant attorney general in the Alaska Department of Law, Civil Division, National Resources Division.

=== Federal judicial service ===
In 2025, Peterson was recommended to the Trump administration by United States Senator Dan Sullivan to be a federal judge after a member of Alaska Governor Mike Dunleavy's federal transition team encouraged him to apply. Circa October 28, 2025, President Donald Trump transmitted a filled out Senate Judiciary Committee Questionnaire for United States district judge for Peterson, prima facie evidence that Peterson's nomination to that office was forthcoming, to a seat on the United States District Court for the District of Alaska vacated by Judge Timothy M. Burgess. Trump announced the nomination on Truth Social on November 12, 2025. His nomination was transmitted to the United States Senate on November 18, 2025. On November 19, 2025, a hearing on his nomination was held by the United States Senate Judiciary Committee. On December 11, 2025, the committee voted to report his nomination to the Senate by a 14–8 vote. On February 4, 2026, his nomination was confirmed by a 58–39 vote. He received his judicial commission on February 10, 2026.

== Personal ==
As of 2025, Peterson resides in Anchorage, Alaska. He is a member of the Federalist Society.

Legal offices
Preceded by Timothy M. Burgess	Judge of the United States District Court for the District of Alaska; 2026–present	Incumbent
