= James von der Heydt =

American judge

Senior Judge of the United States District Court for the District of Alaska
- In office July 15, 1984 – December 1, 2013

Chief Judge of the United States District Court for the District of Alaska
- In office 1973–1984
- Preceded by: Raymond Eugene Plummer
- Succeeded by: James Martin Fitzgerald

Judge of the United States District Court for the District of Alaska
- In office November 3, 1966 – July 15, 1984
- Appointed by: Lyndon B. Johnson
- Preceded by: Walter Hartman Hodge
- Succeeded by: H. Russel Holland

Personal details
- Born: James Arnold von der Heydt; July 15, 1919 Miles City, Montana, U.S.
- Died: December 1, 2013 (aged 94) Anchorage, Alaska, U.S.
- Education: Albion College (BA); Northwestern University (JD)

James Arnold von der Heydt (July 15, 1919 – December 1, 2013) was a United States district judge of the United States District Court for the District of Alaska.

== Education and career ==
Born in Miles City, Montana, von der Heydt received a Bachelor of Arts degree from Albion College in 1942. He received a Juris Doctor from Northwestern University Pritzker School of Law in 1951. He was a Deputy United States Marshal in Nome, Alaska Territory from 1945 to 1948. He was a United States Commissioner for the United States District Court for the District of Alaska Territory in 1951. He was United States Attorney for the District of Alaska Territory from 1951 to 1953. He was in private practice of law in Nome from 1953 to 1959. He was a Member of the Alaska Territory House of Representatives from 1957 to 1959. He was Presiding Judge of the Superior Court of the State of Alaska from 1959 to 1966.

=== Federal judicial service ===
Von der Heydt was nominated by President Lyndon B. Johnson on September 9, 1966, to a seat on the United States District Court for the District of Alaska vacated by Judge Walter Hartman Hodge. He was confirmed by the United States Senate on October 20, 1966, and received his commission on November 3, 1966. He served as Chief Judge from 1973 to 1984. He assumed senior status on July 15, 1984. His service terminated on December 1, 2013, due to his death in Anchorage, Alaska.

== See also ==
- List of United States federal judges by longevity of service

Legal offices
| Preceded by Walter Hartman Hodge | Judge of the United States District Court for the District of Alaska; 1966–1984 | Succeeded by H. Russel Holland |
| Preceded by Raymond Eugene Plummer | Chief Judge of the United States District Court for the District of Alaska; 1973–1984 | Succeeded by James Martin Fitzgerald |
