= Judith Kleinfeld =

American psychologist

Judith Smilg Kleinfeld (born May 29, 1944 – died May 16, 2025) was a professor of psychology at the University of Alaska Fairbanks, who co-chaired the Northern Studies department.

== Life ==
A controversial academic, her most well-known works are the ones criticizing studies on alleged discrimination in educational settings. Her The Myth That Schools Shortchange Girls analyzed the American Association of University Women's report How Schools Shortchange Girls. Kleinfeld's analysis was first publicized at the Women's Freedom Network, received national attention and was covered by The New York Times and The Wall Street Journal.

She had also criticized a 1999 MIT study that supported claims made by some of the university's female professors that their male colleagues enjoyed preferential treatment despite their level of accomplishments. Kleinfeld called the MIT study "junk science" and pointed out that the committee evaluating the charges was led by the primary complainant and cited the committee's reluctance to open its data to peer review.

Kleinfeld was a member at the Women's Freedom Network and the Independent Women's Forum. She was also director at The Boys Project, a not-for-profit group formed to address the female-male gender gap in educational achievement.

She was married to judge Andrew Kleinfeld. Her family is Jewish. She graduated from Wellesley College and Harvard Graduate School of Education.

She died on May 16, 2025, aged 80.
