= Ketchikan Federal Building =

- U.S. National Register of Historic Places
- Alaska Heritage Resources Survey
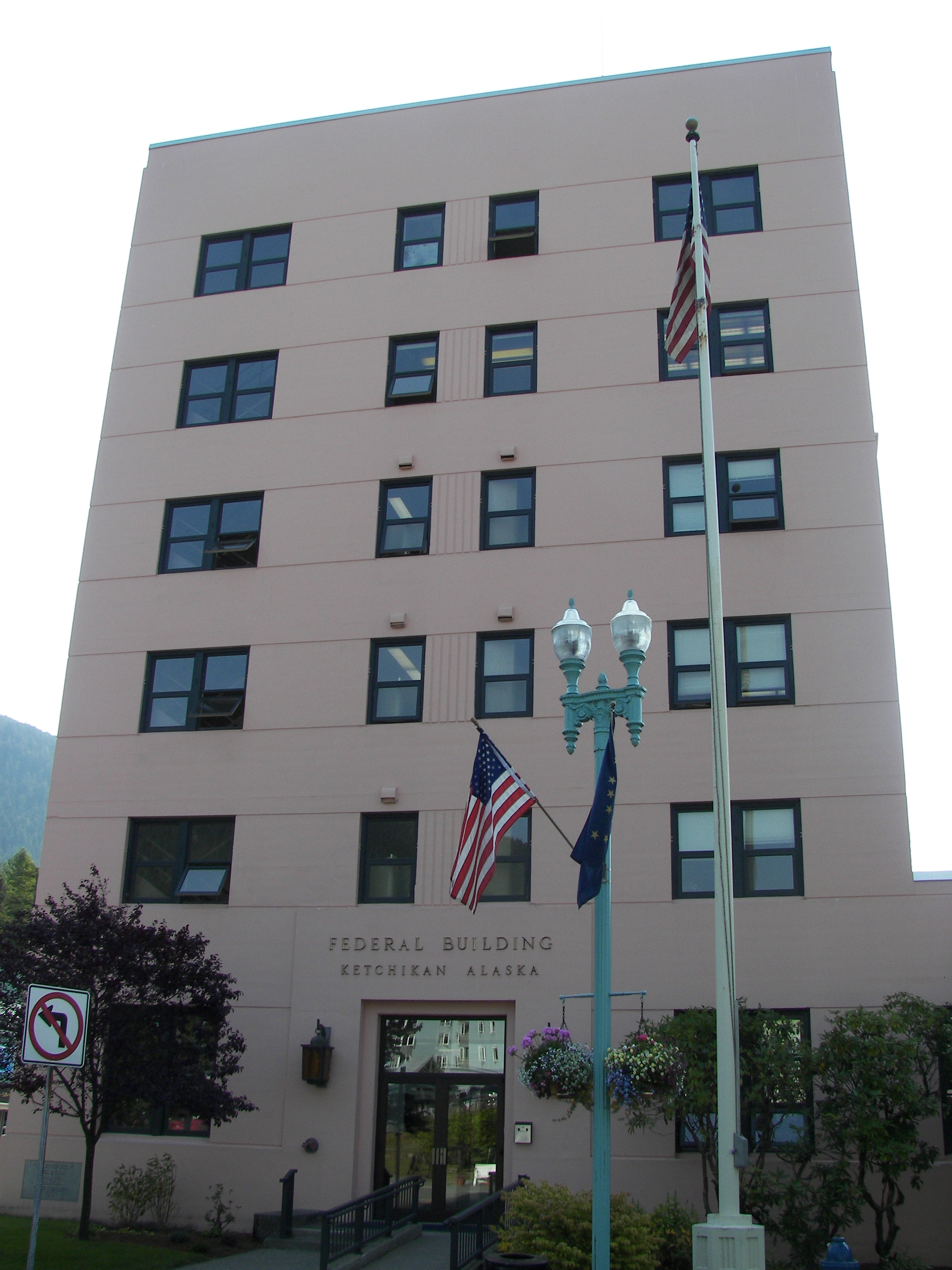

- Location within Alaska
- Location: 648 Mission Street, Ketchikan, Alaska
- Coordinates: 55°20′30″N 131°38′34″W
- Area: 1.74 acres (0.70 ha)
- Built: 1937
- Built by: J. B. Warrack Construction Company
- Architect: Garfield, Stanley-Brown, Harris and Robinson
- Architectural style: Modern Movement
- NRHP reference No.: 05000897
- AHRS No.: KET-00466
- Added to NRHP: April 28, 2006

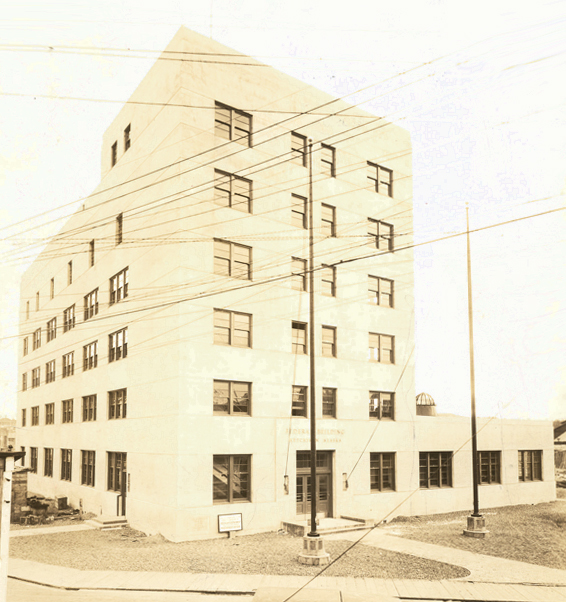
The building as it appeared in 1938.

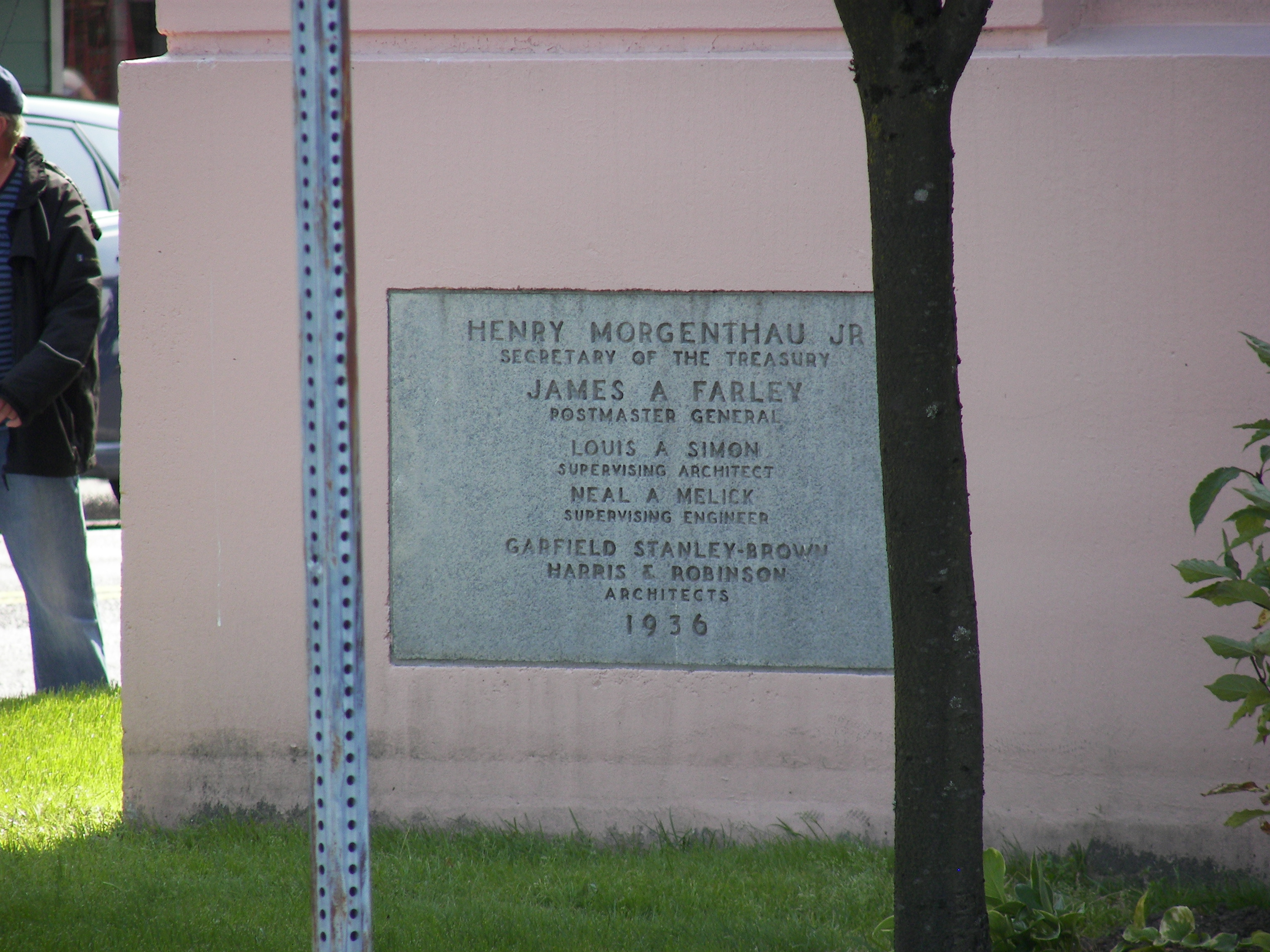
Plaque memorializing federal personnel at the time of construction.

The Ketchikan Federal Building is a courthouse of the United States District Court for the District of Alaska, located at 648 Mission Street in Ketchikan, Alaska. It was completed in 1938, and was listed on the National Register of Historic Places on April 28, 2006. The building's primary tenant is the United States Forest Service Tongass National Forest Supervisor's Office, which occupies space on the first, second, third, fourth and sixth floors. The fifth floor houses a courtroom and related support offices, while the first floor also houses an office of the United States Customs and Border Protection.

== Significance ==
The beginnings of the Ketchikan Federal Building can be traced back to 1924 when the City of Ketchikan was constructing a new school house and little space was left on the school lot for playgrounds. The U.S. Courthouse, constructed in 1905, was located directly across the street and was apparently in "disrepair, inadequate for present needs, and unfavorably located in a residence section with its jail in close proximity to the school". The Ketchikan Women's Council developed a proposal where the City of Ketchikan agreed to donate a site for a new federal building, centrally located in the business district of the city, in exchange for the courthouse site to be used for a school playground.

On July 16, 1924, the Common Council of the City of Ketchikan adopted a memorandum to petition the federal government to make "ample appropriations" for the erection of a new courthouse or federal building. Copies of the memorandum were sent to the office of the Attorney General, the Treasury Department and the Committee on Territories in both the House and the Senate. Relief came from the Works Progress Administration. Ground-breaking ceremonies on March 3, 1937, marked the end of years of continuous struggle by local agencies to obtain a new federal building. The building was designed by the Cleveland architectural firm of Garfield, Stanley-Brown, Harris and Robinson. The J.B. Warrack Construction Company was awarded the building contract of $320,000, not including the elevator, fixtures and furnishings.

The building officially opened on March 5, 1938, a year and a day after ground was first broken. Five times larger than the average federal building in cities of a population of 5,000, the building originally housed 11 governmental departments, services and bureaus. The post office occupied the entire L-shaped first floor, with service and lock box lobbies spanning the length of each wing. The district courtroom, offices and jail cells were located on the fifth floor.

In the 1950s, the movie Cry Vengeance was filmed in the Ketchikan Federal Building and the original layout of the first floor lobby can be seen in some of the scenes.

General Services Administration acquired ownership of the building in 1976, after postal services were relocated to a new facility. In 1977–1978, GSA totally remodeled the building to create modern office space; and additional minor remodeling has occurred since. Remodeling has removed much of the historical significance on the 1st and 4th floors, the old jail space in the southern half of the 5th floor, and much of the private office space on the 2nd and 3rd floors. Intact historical interior elements include window trim; some doors, frames and trim; the entry vestibule floor and wall finishes; the courtroom and adjacent lobby, judge's chambers, and clerk of court's office; the elevator doors; and the northeast stair.

Of interest in the former jail cell area are four murals painted directly on the concrete block walls. These murals are believed to have been transferred from magazines and painted by prisoners who were members of the Tlingit and Haida Alaskan Indian tribes in the early 1980s. The murals are protected by Plexiglas panels and available for limited viewing, located in a private office.

The exterior of the original building is largely intact, except where a new two-story wing was added at the west side of the south end of the original six-story tower. Windows were removed and openings infilled at a new stair added at the south end of the tower, and an insensitively-designed bump-out housing the stair's exterior vestibule was added at the first floor on the south end of the tower. Replacement windows, although not exact duplicates of the original design, match the original material (wood) and proportions. The exterior paint colors were originally white; the current pink and beige colors are not original.

== Architectural description ==
Local newspaper articles at the time of its dedication described the Federal Building in Ketchikan, Alaska as "inside and out, the structure is plain and practical." The six-story, L-shaped building was constructed of cast-in-place reinforced concrete on a structural foundation of driven steel piles with concrete caps. Designed by the Cleveland architectural firm of Garfield, Stanley-Brown, Harris and Robinson; the plain, box-like exterior, flat roofs, and lack of ornament identify the Federal Building as International Style architecture.

Pioneered by European architects shortly after World War I, the International Style rejected the ornate designs of previous eras, turning instead to a streamlined, modern approach for buildings. Walls were flat planes with no decorative treatment and windows were placed flush to the exterior. This style became widely accepted in the United States in the mid-1930s.

The building also represents a regional construction type and style known within Federal organizations as New Deal Concrete. A number of federal buildings built under Roosevelt's New Deal plan exhibit similar characteristics.

The Federal Building is located at the southwest corner of Mission and Stedman Streets in downtown Ketchikan. The site is bounded by concrete sidewalks and grassy lawns on the northwest and northeast sides, and by paved concrete parking lots on the southeast and southwest. The northwest lawn features a metal flagpole with a concrete base, one of two originals. After almost four decades of grass bounded by chain link fencing, in the mid 1970s, landscaping was added and the fencing removed at the northeast and northwest lawns at Stedman and Mission Streets. The original steps at the main entry have been altered by the addition of a functional but insensitively designed off-center ramp with painted free-standing metal handrails.

The L-shaped building consists of a long and narrow six-story tower stretching along Stedman Street to the northeast, with the narrow end of the tower and a one-story wing facing Mission Street to the northwest. The inside of the "L" originally included a basement level boiler room. While the main blocks of the building have remained intact; in 1954, a one- and two-story wing was added to the southeast side, east end of the main tower, adjacent to the boiler room. This addition has metal panel and stucco exterior finishes.

The original building sits on a slightly projecting concrete base. The concrete wall surfaces have a rubbed finish and are smooth except for continuous horizontal reveals at the heights of window sills and heads on each floor level. The building is terminated by a slightly recessed continuous concrete parapet cap. The exterior elevations are penetrated by grouped window openings which align vertically and horizontally, from floor-to-floor. The original horizontal-light, two-over-two, wood double-hung sash windows, some with matching transoms, have been replaced by new, single-light, one-over-one, wood units with operable awning sash below fixed upper sash(es). The building was painted pink in 1990, at the request of the newly built Cape Fox Lodge; the color was decided upon by a local committee. The exterior concrete and paint is deteriorated. A study has recently been completed, identifying deficiencies and recommendations for improvement.

The main building entrance is centered on the narrow northwest face of the six-story tower. The main entry doors are framed by a slightly protruding concrete surround that matches the base element. Two wrought-iron coach-lights (not original) are located at the sides of the entry doors and original cast bronze letters reading "FEDERAL BUILDING KETCHIKAN ALASKA" are located directly above the doors. The commemorative granite corner stone is located near the east end of the north wall.

The original interior of the building continued the simple and practical theme. The most significant spaces were the postal lobbies on the first floor, and the courtroom and lobby on the fifth floor. Due to substantial renovation work in the 1970s, only the fifth floor courtroom and its lobby retains their original integrity.

== See also ==
- National Register of Historic Places listings in Ketchikan Gateway Borough, Alaska
