= Pamela Scott Washington =

American judge (born c. 1962)

Pamela Scott Washington (born circa 1962) is an American judge. She was the first black woman and second black jurist to sit on the bench in Alaska.

== Personal life ==
Washington was born in New Orleans, Louisiana and spent some time as a child in Jackson, Mississippi. In 1975, when she was in the 8th grade, her stepfather moved the family to Anchorage, Alaska. She attended Clark Middle School for one year. The family then moved to Eagle River, Anchorage. She was graduated from Chugiak High School in Chugiak, Alaska in 1980. She was the only black girl in her class.

She was graduated from Northern Arizona University with a degree in telecommunications in 1984 and then earned a J.D. degree from Arizona State University College of Law in 1991.

== Career ==
After law school, Washington returned to Alaska and clerked in the Public Defender Agency and for Alaska Superior Court Judge John Reese. For the next 13 years, Washington was in private practice operating in the areas of family law, employment law, criminal defense, and personal injury. In 2006, she became a domestic violence prosecutor for the Municipality of Anchorage's Department of Law, Criminal Division. As a lawyer, she was frequently the only black attorney in the courthouse.

Washington was appointed as a judge on August 9, 2010, by Governor Sean Parnell. She was installed on November 5, 2010. In the spring of 2010, Washington was an adjunct faculty member at the University of Alaska Anchorage.

== Public service ==
She also served with the Anchorage Youth Court, Anchorage Crisis Pregnancy Center, NAACP, North to the Future Business and Professional Women. She has also been a women's leader at Faith Christian Community and a mentor in the Alaska Court System's Color of Justice program. Washington has been active with the Anchorage East Rotary, United Way, Bridge Builders, Kids’ Corp Head Start, Youth Challenge Job Corp at Ft. Richardson, and the Mountain View Elementary Mentoring program.

Washington was the Alaska state chapter president of the National Association of Women Judges.

== See also ==
- List of first women lawyers and judges in Alaska
