= Lester O. Gore =

American judge (1890–1965)

Lester Otto Gore (November 18, 1890 – November 3, 1965) was an American attorney and judge who served as a justice of the Alaska Territorial District Court from 1932 to 1934.

== Early life and career ==
Born in Columbia County, Oregon, Gore gained admission to the bar in Alaska in 1914. He was an assistant United States Attorney from 1921 to 1925. Gore was "active in establishment of the pulp industry in Alaska and was a director of the Miners and Merchants Bank from the time of its founding".

== Judicial service and later life ==
Appointed to the territorial supreme court by President Herbert Hoover, Gore's nomination was delayed for some time while Senator Clarence Dill of Washington investigated protests filed with the Senate Judiciary Committee that Gore had "harassed the independent salmon fishermen" while serving under Attorney General Harry M. Daugherty. Dill deemed the accusations unfounded, and Gore's nomination was reported favorably out of the committee on June 20, 1932.

After leaving the court, Gore returned to private practice in Ketchikan, Alaska, with Justice John H. Dimond later recalling that "Bob Jernberg made good money down there. His former partner, Lester Gore, took Bob in. Lester died and Bob practiced by himself". Noting that it was unusual for a judge to return to private practice, Dimond observed that "Lester Gore had been judge up in Nome and then he went back to practice in Ketchikan".

In the 1936 United States House of Representatives elections, Gore was the Republican nominee to serve as the non-voting congressional delegate for the Alaska Territory. Gore was defeated by the Democrat, Anthony Dimond, 72.6% to 27.4%.

== Personal life and death ==
Gore and his wife, Irene, had two sons and two daughters.

He died at Ketchikan General Hospital after a lengthy illness, weeks before turning 75.

== See also ==
- United States District Court for the District of Alaska

Political offices
| Preceded by Gudbrand J. Lomen | Justice of the Alaska Territorial District Court; 1932–1934 | Succeeded by J. H. S. Morison |
