= List of first minority male lawyers and judges in Alaska =

This is a list of the first minority male lawyer(s) and judge(s) in Alaska. It includes the year in which the men were admitted to practice law (in parentheses). Also included are other distinctions such as the first minority men in their state to graduate from law school or become a political figure.

== Firsts in Alaska's history ==
=== Lawyers ===
- First Jewish American male: Solomon Ripinsky
- First Alaskan Native (Tlingit) male: William Paul

=== State judges ===
- First Jewish American male (Supreme Court of Alaska; justice and chief justice): Jay A. Rabinowitz in 1965 and 1972 respectively
- First Filipino American male: Richard "Rick" Siangco c. 1970s
- First openly gay male: Victor Carlson in 1975
- First Alaskan Native (Tlingit) male: Roy Madsen in 1975
- First Hispanic American male: Rene J. Gonzalez in 1984
- First African American male: Larry Card in 1993
- First Asian American/openly gay male (Superior Court Master): Jonathon Lack in 2007
- First deaf male: Charles "Chuck" W. Ray Jr. in 2012

=== Attorney General of Alaska ===
- First Jewish American male: Avrum Gross in 1974

== See also ==
- List of first minority male lawyers and judges in the United States

== Other topics of interest ==
- List of first women lawyers and judges in the United States
- List of first women lawyers and judges in Alaska
