= Joshua Kindred =

American lawyer (born 1977)

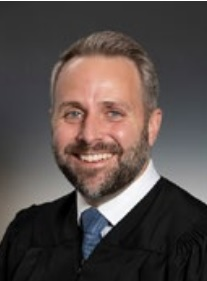

Judge of the United States District Court for the District of Alaska
- In office February 18, 2020 – July 8, 2024
- Appointed by: Donald Trump
- Preceded by: Ralph Beistline
- Succeeded by: vacant

Personal details
- Born: Joshua Michael Kindred; 1977 (age 48–49) Goldsboro, North Carolina, U.S.
- Party: Republican
- Education: University of Alaska Anchorage (BA); Willamette University (JD)

Joshua Michael Kindred (born 1977) is an American former lawyer and former United States district judge of the United States District Court for the District of Alaska. He served on the court from 2020 to 2024. He resigned after being accused of creating a hostile work environment, sexually assaulting a former clerk, and lying to investigators about his behavior. He was subsequently disbarred.

== Education ==
Kindred graduated from the University of Alaska Anchorage in 2002 with a Bachelor of Arts. He then attended the Willamette University College of Law, where he was editor-in-chief of the Willamette Law Review. He graduated in 2005 with a Juris Doctor degree.

== Career ==
After law school, Kindred served as a law clerk to chief justice Paul De Muniz of the Oregon Supreme Court from 2005 to 2007. He was in private practice with the Seattle-based law firm Lane Powell from 2007 to 2008. From 2008 to 2013, Kindred served as an assistant district attorney and violent unit supervisor for Alaska. He was environmental counsel to the Alaska Oil and Gas Association from 2013 to 2018, and from 2018 to 2020 he was the regional solicitor for the United States Department of the Interior's Alaska Region.

=== Federal judicial service ===
On October 16, 2019, President Donald Trump announced his intent to nominate Kindred to serve as a United States District Judge for the United States District Court for the District of Alaska. On November 21, 2019, his nomination was sent to the Senate. President Trump nominated Kindred to the seat vacated by Judge Ralph Beistline, who assumed senior status on December 31, 2015. A hearing on his nomination before the Senate Judiciary Committee was held on December 4, 2019.

Alaska's Senators Dan Sullivan and Lisa Murkowski praised Kindred's nomination. On January 3, 2020, his nomination was returned to the President under Rule XXXI, Paragraph 6 of the United States Senate. Later that day, he was re-nominated to the same seat. On January 16, 2020, his nomination was reported out of committee by a 12–10 vote. On February 11, 2020, the Senate invoked cloture on his nomination by a 52–41 vote. On February 12, 2020, his nomination was confirmed by a 54–41 vote. He received his judicial commission on February 18, 2020.

Kindred resigned on July 8, 2024. On the day of his resignation, the Judicial Council of the Ninth Circuit released a report finding that Kindred had engaged in judicial misconduct by creating a sexually hostile workplace environment for clerks employed in his chambers, by having an inappropriate sexualized relationship with a clerk during and after her time working for Kindred (which the clerk characterized as sexual assault), and for having "deliberately lied" to investigators. The Council stated that Kindred was asked to voluntarily resign and he did so. On September 12, 2024, the Judicial Conference of the United States referred Kindred to the United States House of Representatives for impeachment, despite Kindred's resignation. An impeachment and subsequent conviction would bar Kindred from holding office in the future. The Judicial Conference of the United States described Kindred's behavior as "reprehensible," and stated that it was so severe it warranted review by the United States Congress.

On November 7, 2025, the Supreme Court of the State of Alaska disbarred Kindred.

== Personal life ==
In October 2013, Kindred married lawyer Talitha "Tali" Birch, daughter of Alaska politician Chris Birch.

Legal offices
Preceded by Ralph Beistline	Judge of the United States District Court for the District of Alaska; 2020–2024	Vacant
