= Douglas Baily =

American lawyer

Douglas B. Baily

Attorney General of Alaska
- In office February 16, 1989 – January 1990
- Governor: Steve Cowper
- Preceded by: Grace Berg Schaible
- Succeeded by: Charles E. Cole

United States Attorney for the District of Alaska
- In office 1969–1971
- President: Richard Nixon
- Preceded by: Marvin W. Frankel
- Succeeded by: G. Kent Edwards

Personal details
- Born: January 27, 1937 (age 89) Evanston, Illinois
- Party: Republican
- Children: 3
- Education: Beloit College (BS); University of Illinois (LLB)
- Occupation: Lawyer

Douglas B. "Doug" Baily (born January 27, 1937) is an American lawyer. Baily served as U.S. Attorney for the District of Alaska from 1969 to 1971, and was the Attorney General of Alaska from 1989 to 1990. He served as administrative assistant to Governor Jay Hammond and as a trustee of the Alaska Permanent Fund.

== Tenure as attorney general ==
The most controversial issue that arose during his tenure as state attorney general was the Exxon Valdez oil spill in Alaska, on March 24, 1989. After the spill, Baily filed multiple court cases against Exxon Corp. and the Alyeska Pipeline Service Company.

== Personal life ==
Douglas and his wife Landa live in Homer, Ak. Prior residence in Oakland, Oregon where they maintained the Old Baily Heritage Farm. The Old Baily Heritage Farm raised rare breeds of American Livestock, including Myotonic Goats, Dexter Cattle, and America Guinea Hogs, and is a sustaining member of the American Livestock Breeds Conservancy, the pioneer organization in the U.S. working to conserve historic breeds and genetic diversity in American livestock.
