= Hurff Ackerman Saunders Federal Building and Robert Boochever U.S. Courthouse =

U.S. Federal Building in Alaska

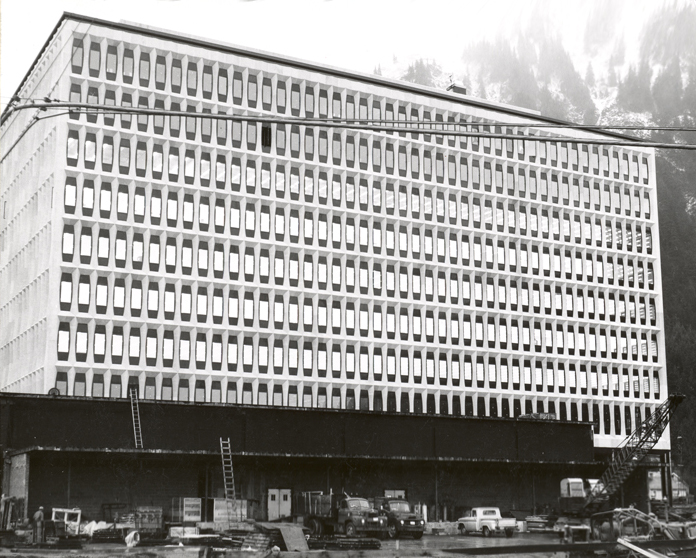
- The Federal Building and US Courthouse, during the final stages of construction in 1965
- Interactive map of the Hurff Ackerman Saunders Federal Building and Robert Boochever U.S. Courthouse area
- Alternative names: Juneau Federal Building

General information
- Status: In use
- Location: 709 West 9th Street, Juneau, Alaska, United States of America
- Coordinates: 58.3014°N 134.4202°W
- Construction started: 1964
- Opened: 1966
- Owner: United States federal government
- Landlord: General Services Administration

Technical details
- Floor count: 9

Design and construction
- Architects: Olsen & Sands; Linn A. Forrest; John Graham & Company

Other information
- Parking: Basement (restricted); Parking lot across Gold Creek

The Hurff Ackerman Saunders Federal Building and Robert Boochever U.S. Courthouse (known locally as "the Federal Building") is a United States Federal Building, United States Post Office and Federal court, located in Juneau, Alaska. Built in 1964 and completed in 1966, the structure is located at 709 W. 9th Street, on the outskirts of downtown, near the Juneau-Douglas Bridge and across the street from the downtown Capital City Fire/Rescue station. The building serves as the official federal representation for the capital city of Alaska.

Managed by the General Services Administration, the building has nine floors, plus a basement and mezzanine level. The building is located next to Gold Creek, a natural watershed which has been lined with concrete, carrying runoff from Mount Juneau.

== Tenants ==
The building contains the Juneau offices and chambers of the U.S. District Court for the District of Alaska. It also contains offices for major federal agencies, including:

- Board of Immigration Appeals
- Environmental Protection Agency
- Federal Bureau of Investigation
- Federal Highway Administration
- Federal Housing Authority
- National Oceanic and Atmospheric Administration
- Robert Boochever United States Courthouse
- Social Security Administration
- United States Army Corps of Engineers
- United States Coast Guard
- United States Department of Agriculture
- United States Forest Service
- United States Postal Service
- United States Veterans Administration

Reach, Inc., a Juneau-based non-profit organization, operates the 9th Street Cafe, a restaurant on the Second Floor.

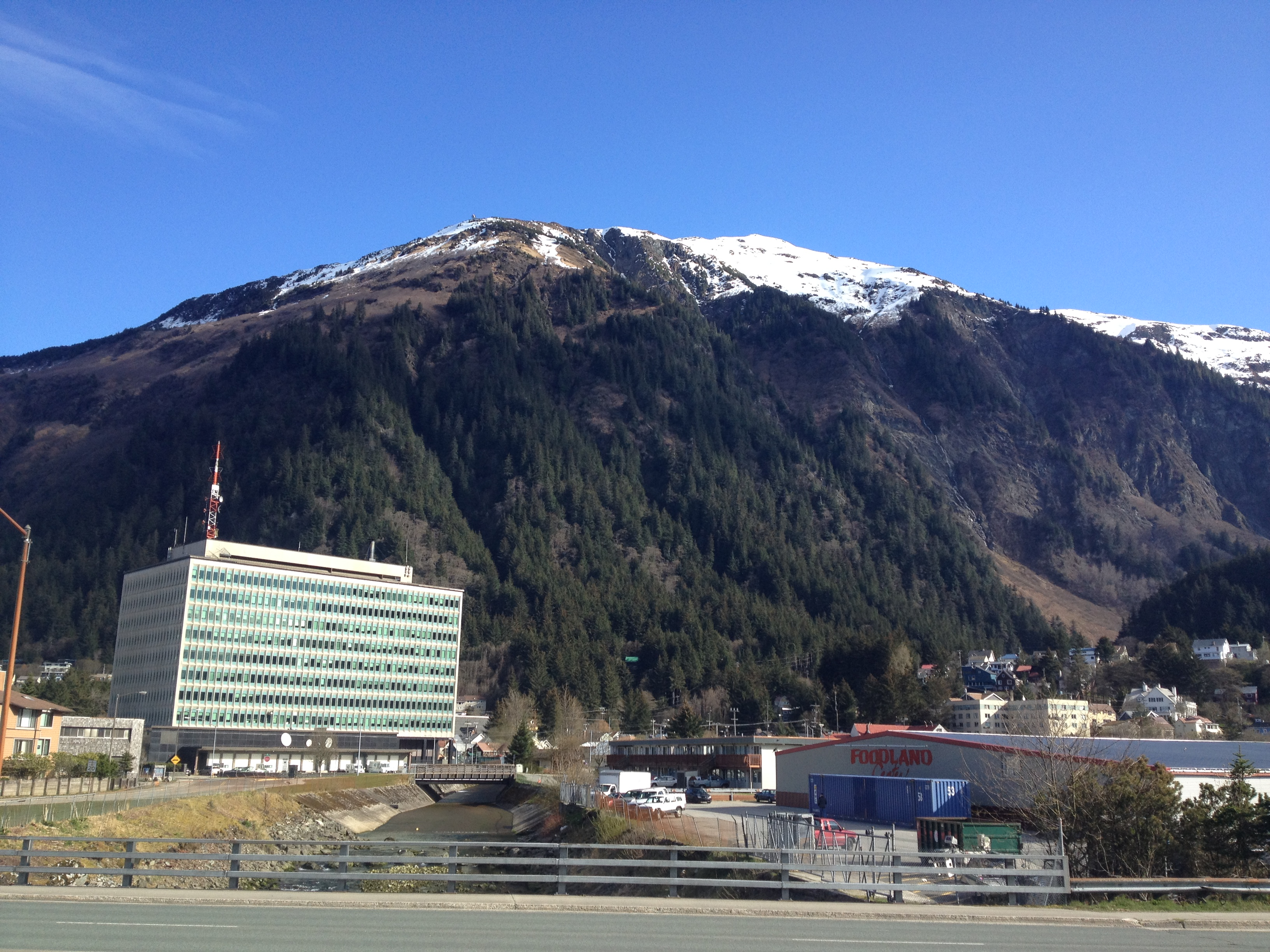
The Hurff Ackerman Saunders Federal Building and Robert Boochever US Courthouse, with Mount Juneau in the background, and Gold Creek in the foreground, in 2015

== Hurff Ackerman Saunders and Robert Boochever ==
Hurff Ackerman Saunders was born July 29, 1903, in South Dakota, and moved to Alaska in 1941 while it was still a US territory. Saunders obtained a civilian position with the Coast Guard, working as a civil engineer. During World War II, Saunders made numerous corrections to the nautical maps of the period, making the Alaskan waters much safer for the US Navy and Coast Guard. Prior to his retirement, Saunders completed building the Federal Building which went on to bear his name. Hurff Saunders died in Juneau on August 29, 1996, at the age of 93.

Robert Boochever was born October 2, 1917, in New York City, and was a United States federal judge and a Justice of the Alaska Supreme Court. Boochever became an associate justice of the Alaska Supreme Court in 1972, and served until 1980. From 1975 until 1978, Boochever served as Chief Justice. in 1980, President Jimmy Carter appointed Boochever to a seat on the United States Court of Appeals for the Ninth Circuit, where he served until his death on October 9, 2011, at the age of 94.

== See also ==
List of United States federal courthouses in Alaska
