= Raymond Eugene Plummer =

American judge

Senior Judge of the United States District Court for the District of Alaska
- In office June 1, 1973 – December 26, 1987

Chief Judge of the United States District Court for the District of Alaska
- In office 1966–1973
- Preceded by: Walter Hartman Hodge
- Succeeded by: James von der Heydt

Judge of the United States District Court for the District of Alaska
- In office September 18, 1961 – June 1, 1973
- Appointed by: John F. Kennedy
- Preceded by: Seat established by 75 Stat. 80
- Succeeded by: James Martin Fitzgerald

Personal details
- Born: Raymond Eugene Plummer; March 27, 1913 Harlan, Iowa
- Died: December 26, 1987 (aged 74)
- Education: University of Nebraska (BA, LLB)

Raymond Eugene Plummer (March 27, 1913 – December 26, 1987) was a United States district judge of the United States District Court for the District of Alaska.

== Early life and education ==
Born in Harlan, Iowa, Plummer received a Bachelor of Arts degree from the University of Nebraska in 1937 and a Bachelor of Laws from the University of Nebraska College of Law in 1939.

== Career ==
Plummer worked in private practice of law in Dallas, Texas from 1939 to 1940. He was in private practice of law in Lincoln, Nebraska from 1940 to 1944. He was an assistant United States attorney of the District of Alaska Territory from 1944 to 1946. He was the United States attorney for the District of Alaska Territory from 1946 to 1949. He was in private practice of law in Anchorage, Territory of Alaska from 1949 to 1961.

=== Federal judicial service ===
Plummer was nominated by President John F. Kennedy on August 28, 1961, to the United States District Court for the District of Alaska, to a new seat created by 75 Stat. 80. He was confirmed by the United States Senate on September 8, 1961, and received his commission on September 18, 1961. He served as Chief Judge from 1966 to 1973. He assumed senior status due to a certified disability on June 1, 1973. His service was terminated on December 26, 1987, due to his death.

Legal offices
Preceded by Seat established by 75 Stat. 80	Judge of the United States District Court for the District of Alaska; 1961–1973	Succeeded by James Martin Fitzgerald
Preceded by Walter Hartman Hodge	Chief Judge of the United States District Court for the District of Alaska; 1966–1973	Succeeded by James von der Heydt
