= Timothy M. Burgess =

American judge (born 1956)

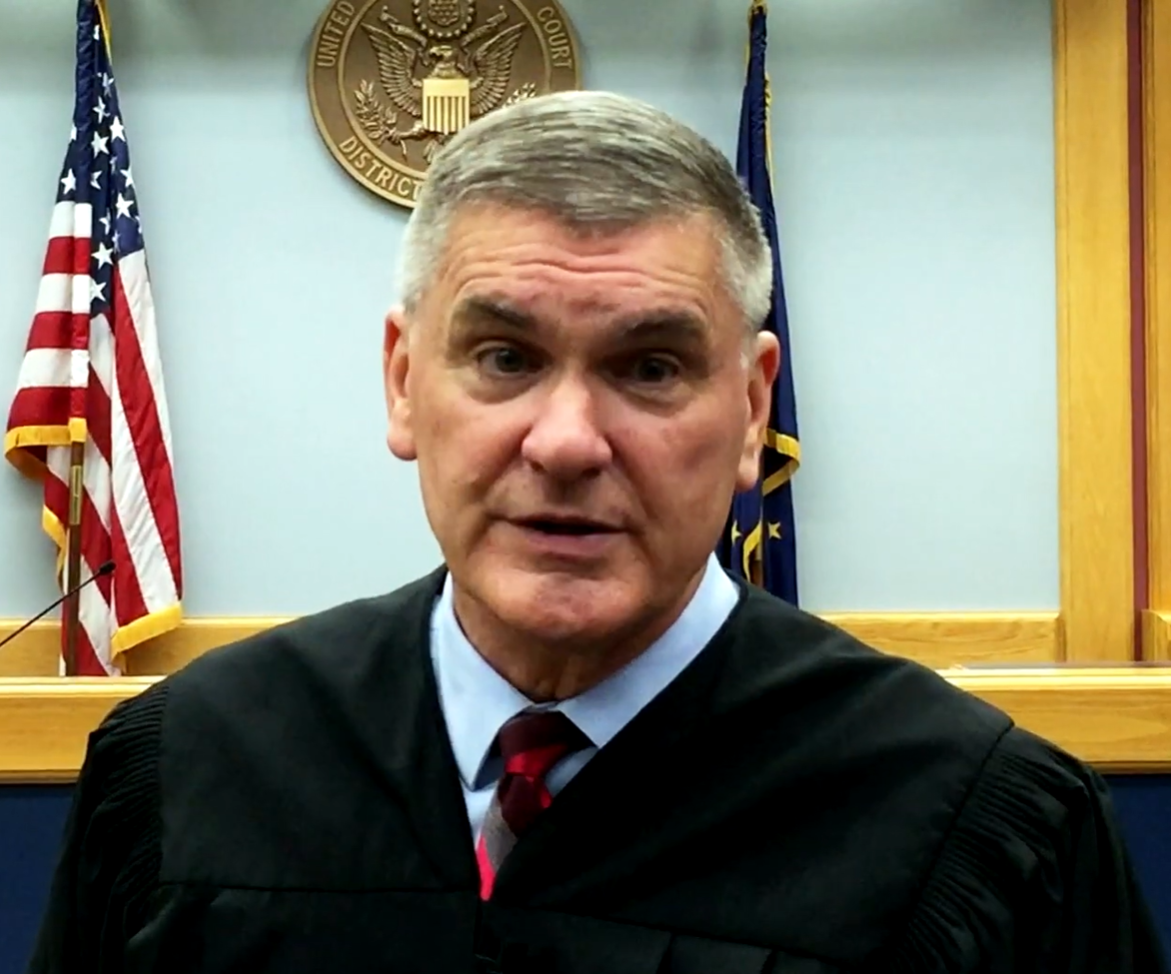
- Burgess in 2020

Senior Judge of the United States District Court for the District of Alaska
- Incumbent
- Assumed office December 31, 2021

Chief Judge of the United States District Court for the District of Alaska
- In office December 31, 2015 – December 31, 2021
- Preceded by: Ralph Beistline
- Succeeded by: Sharon L. Gleason

Judge of the United States District Court for the District of Alaska
- In office January 23, 2006 – December 31, 2021
- Appointed by: George W. Bush
- Preceded by: James K. Singleton
- Succeeded by: Aaron C. Peterson

Personal details
- Born: August 11, 1956 (age 70) San Francisco, California, U.S.
- Party: Independent
- Education: Cañada College (AA); University of Alaska Fairbanks (BA, MBA); Northeastern University (JD)

Timothy Mark Burgess (born August 11, 1956) is a senior United States district judge of the United States District Court for the District of Alaska. He served as the District of Alaska's U.S. attorney from 2001 to 2005.

== Education and career ==
Burgess was born in San Francisco. He received an Associate of Arts degree from Cañada College in Redwood City, California in 1976. Next, he attended the University of Alaska Fairbanks in Fairbanks on a basketball scholarship, earning a Bachelor of Arts degree in 1978 and a Master of Business Administration degree in 1982. He received his Juris Doctor degree from Northeastern University School of Law in Boston in 1987. He went into private practice in Anchorage, Alaska with the law firm Gilmore & Feldman (now Cashion Gilmore & Lindemuth) from 1987 to 1989. Burgess served as an assistant United States Attorney in the District of Alaska from 1989 to 2001 and then as the United States Attorney until 2005.

== Federal judicial service ==
He was nominated by President George W. Bush on July 28, 2005, to the seat on the United States District Court for the District of Alaska vacated by James K. Singleton He was confirmed by the United States Senate on December 21, 2005, and received his commission on January 23, 2006. He served as chief judge from December 31, 2015, to December 31, 2021, the same date he assumed senior status.

== Personal life ==
Burgess and his wife, Joanne Grace, live in Anchorage and have four children.

== Sources ==
Legal offices
Preceded by James Keith Singleton Jr.	Judge of the United States District Court for the District of Alaska; 2006–2021	Succeeded by Aaron C. Peterson
Preceded by Ralph Beistline	Chief Judge of the United States District Court for the District of Alaska; 2015–2021	Succeeded by Sharon L. Gleason
