= Dorothy Tyner =

American judge

Dorothy D. Tyner
- Died: January 29, 1986; Anchorage, Alaska, U.S.
- Citizenship: American

Academic background
- Education: Washburn University

Dorothy D. Tyner (died January 29, 1986) was an American judge. She was, along with Mary Alice Miller, the first female judge in Alaska.

== Personal life ==
Tyner was originally from Kansas and attended the Washburn University School of Law. She was admitted to the Kansas bar in 1941. In the mid-1940s, she married F.E. Stangl, a soldier at Fort Richardson. After her marriage, she continued to use her maiden name as her professional name.

== Alaskan statehood ==
Shortly after moving to the territory, she became an advocate for Alaskan statehood. In 1947, she argued in front of the United States House of Representatives' Subcommittee on Territorial and Insular Possessions in favor of statehood for Alaska.

== Career ==
While in Kansas City, Tyner worked on the regional war labor board. She also taught law at Washburn University.

Tyner moved to Juneau, Alaska in 1944 as an assistant enforcement attorney in the Office of Price Administration and traveled extensively throughout the state as part of her duties. When Tyner visited in Anchorage in 1945 to explore what her prospects might be as an attorney, members of the bar association "wined and dined" her in an effort to lure her to the community. She became the first woman to open a private law practice in Anchorage in 1946. She worked in the area of rent control and in 1952 was named the acting area rent director for Alaska.

In 1958, Tyner challenged Hugh Wade, a fellow Democrat, for territorial treasurer.

Tyner was appointed by Governor Wally Hickel as a district court judge in Anchorage in 1968. She presided over the case that declared Hale Boggs dead and signed his death certificate. Tyner retired from the bench in 1977.

Tyner died in Anchorage on January 29, 1986, at the age of 72.

== See also ==
- List of first women lawyers and judges in Alaska

== Work cited ==
- Cravez, Pamela (April 15, 2017). The Biggest Damned Hat: Tales from Alaska's Territorial Lawyers and Judges. University of Alaska Press. ISBN 978-1-60223-317-1.
