= Sharon L. Gleason =

American federal judge (born 1957)

Sharon Gleason
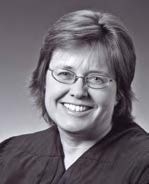

Chief Judge of the United States District Court for the District of Alaska
- Incumbent
- Assumed office January 1, 2022
- Preceded by: Timothy M. Burgess

Judge of the United States District Court for the District of Alaska
- Incumbent
- Assumed office January 4, 2012
- Appointed by: Barack Obama
- Preceded by: John W. Sedwick

Personal details
- Born: 1957 (age 68–69) Rochester, New York, U.S.
- Education: Washington University in St. Louis (BA); University of California, Davis (JD)

Sharon Louise Gleason (born 1957) is an American lawyer and jurist who serves as the chief United States district judge of the United States District Court for the District of Alaska. Appointed by President Barack Obama in 2012, Gleason is the first woman to serve as a federal judge in the District of Alaska. She was previously a state court judge on the Alaska Superior Court from 2001 to 2012.

== Early life and education ==
Gleason was born in 1957 in Rochester, New York. She graduated from Washington University in St. Louis in 1979 with a Bachelor of Arts degree magna cum laude. From 1979 to 1980, Gleason studied at Tufts University's Fletcher School of Law and Diplomacy. She then attended the UC Davis School of Law, graduating in 1983 with a Juris Doctor degree and Order of the Coif honors.

== Career ==
After law school, Gleason was a law clerk for chief justice Edmond W. Burke of the Alaska Supreme Court from 1983 to 1984. She was in private practice at the Alaska law firm Reese, Rice & Volland from 1984 to 1995, and as a sole legal practitioner from 1995 to 2001.

In 2001, Alaska governor Tony Knowles appointed Gleason to be an Alaska Superior Court judge. She then was retained by Alaska voters in 2004 and 2010. She is a former musician and member of the Anchorage Symphony Orchestra.

=== Federal judicial service ===
On April 6, 2011, President Barack Obama nominated Gleason to the United States District Court for the District of Alaska to a vacancy that had been created by Judge John W. Sedwick, who assumed senior status on March 13, 2011. The nomination occurred on the recommendation of Senator Mark Begich. On September 8, 2011, the Senate Judiciary Committee reported her nomination to the Senate floor by a voice vote. The United States Senate confirmed Gleason by an 87–8 vote on November 15, 2011. She received her commission on January 4, 2012. She became chief judge on January 1, 2022.

=== Notable cases ===
- On July 31, 2015, Gleason ruled that environmental group Greenpeace USA would be fined $2,500 for each hour its activists block a Shell Oil (A Dutch owned corporation) icebreaking ship from leaving Portland by dangling from the St. Johns Bridge. The Shell icebreaker was part of a controversial move by Congress to allow a foreign-based corporation to drill in the Arctic. However by September 2015 Shell had abandoned their attempts to establish drilling operations in Alaska, citing dangerous conditions, high costs (over $7 billion spent), and little evidence of oil in the areas they had attempted to explore.
- On March 29, 2019, Gleason issued two additional rulings related to Alaskan environmental issues. One ruling found that the administration of Donald Trump unlawfully sought to open the Chukchi Sea to offshore drilling activities. This area had previously been withdrawn from consideration while Barack Obama was president. Gleason's finding hinged on the fact that the Outer Continental Shelf Lands Act of 1953 permits a President to withdraw certain areas from eligibility for offshore drilling, but only Congress can add such areas. A separate ruling blocked the Trump administration's attempts to use a land transfer to facilitate construction of a road through a federally-designated wetland in the Izembek National Wildlife Refuge. The road would have connected the towns of King Cove and Cold Bay. A different land transfer plan had already been rejected in 2013 by the Department of the Interior. Secretary Sally Jewell, in announcing the rejection, indicated that construction of the road would cause "irreversible damage not only to the Refuge itself, but to the wildlife that depend on it".
- On August 18, 2021, Gleason vacated permits issued by the Trump Administration for ConocoPhillips' Willow project in the National Petroleum Reserve–Alaska. According to the decision, the permits relied on a report by the United States Fish and Wildlife Service that lacked specifics regarding mitigation measures for polar bears.
- On November 9, 2023, Gleason upheld the Biden administration's approval of the Willow project and rejected claims by an Iñupiat group and environmentalists against it.

== Personal life ==
Sharon L. Gleason is the granddaughter of Estonian politician Timotheus Grünthal and Estonian feminist and lawyer Vera Poska-Grünthal. Estonian politician, lawyer and diplomat Jaan Poska was her great grandfather.

== See also ==
- List of first women lawyers and judges in Alaska

Legal offices
Preceded by John W. Sedwick	Judge of the United States District Court for the District of Alaska; 2012–present	Incumbent
Preceded by Timothy M. Burgess	Chief Judge of the United States District Court for the District of Alaska; 2022–present	Incumbent
