= James K. Singleton =

American judge (born 1939)

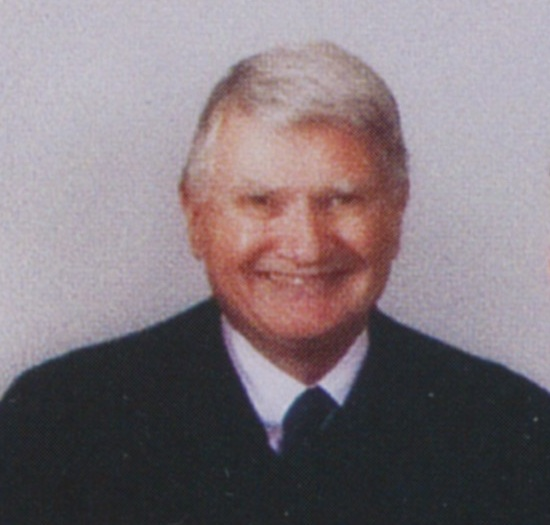

Senior Judge of the United States District Court for the District of Alaska
- Incumbent
- Assumed office January 27, 2005

Chief Judge of the United States District Court for the District of Alaska
- In office 1995–2002
- Preceded by: H. Russel Holland
- Succeeded by: John W. Sedwick

Judge of the United States District Court for the District of Alaska
- In office May 14, 1990 – January 27, 2005
- Appointed by: George H. W. Bush
- Preceded by: James Martin Fitzgerald
- Succeeded by: Timothy M. Burgess

Personal details
- Born: James Keith Singleton Jr. January 27, 1939 (age 87) Oakland, California
- Education: University of California, Berkeley (BA, LLB)

James Keith Singleton Jr. (born January 27, 1939) is a senior United States district judge of the United States District Court for the District of Alaska.

== Education and career ==
Born in Oakland, California, Singleton attended the University of California at Berkeley, where he was a member of Tau Kappa Epsilon fraternity, earning an Bachelor of Arts degree in 1961, and a Bachelor of Laws from the University of California at Berkeley, Boalt Hall School of Law in 1964. He was in private practice in Anchorage, Alaska until 1970, then served as a judge on the Alaska Superior Court from 1970 to 1980, and on the Alaska Court of Appeals from 1980 to 1990.

== Federal judicial service ==
Singleton was nominated by President George H. W. Bush on January 24, 1990, to a seat on the United States District Court for the District of Alaska vacated by Judge James Martin Fitzgerald. Singleton was confirmed by the United States Senate on May 11, 1990, and received his commission on May 14, 1990. He served as chief judge of that court from 1995 to 2002, and assumed senior status on January 27, 2005.

== Sources ==
Legal offices
Preceded by James Martin Fitzgerald	Judge of the United States District Court for the District of Alaska; 1990–2005	Succeeded by Timothy Mark Burgess
Preceded by H. Russel Holland	Chief Judge of the United States District Court for the District of Alaska; 1995–2002	Succeeded by John W. Sedwick
