= Karen Loeffler =

American lawyer

Karen L. Loeffler
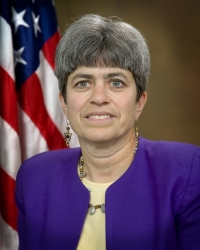

United States Attorney for the District of Alaska
- In office October 16, 2009 – March 10, 2017
- President: Barack Obama; Donald Trump
- Preceded by: Nelson Cohen
- Succeeded by: Bryan Schroder

Personal details
- Born: March 28, 1957 (age 69) New York City, New York, U.S.
- Education: Dartmouth College (BA); Harvard University (JD)

Karen L. Loeffler (born March 28, 1957) is an American attorney who served as the United States Attorney for the District of Alaska. She was appointed in 2009 by President Barack Obama, replacing Nelson Cohen. She resigned her position in March 2017. Loeffler was the first female U.S. Attorney for Alaska. As one of 93 U.S. Attorneys nationwide, she represented the United States in all civil and criminal cases within the district.

== Early life and education ==
Loeffler was born in New York City in 1957 and raised in Minneapolis, Minnesota. She attended Dartmouth College, graduating magna cum laude with a degree in government in 1979. During college, she was a member of the varsity tennis team and the varsity ski team. She then attended Harvard Law School, graduating cum laude with a Juris Doctor in 1983.

== Career ==
From 1983 to 1985, Loeffler was an associate at the law firm Faegre and Benson in Minneapolis, Minnesota. In 1985, she moved to Anchorage, Alaska, spending one year as an Assistant Attorney General and three years as an Assistant District Attorney. After serving as Special Assistant United States Attorney during the case United States v. Dischner and Mathisen, she was offered an appointment as an Assistant United States Attorney in 1989. During this time, she twice served as the Chief of the Criminal Division.

== See also ==
- 2017 dismissal of U.S. attorneys
- Alaska political corruption probe

Political offices
Preceded by Nelson Cohen	United States Attorney for the District of Alaska; 2009–2017	Succeeded by Bryan Schroder (Acting)
