= Bryan Schroder =

American lawyer (born 1959)

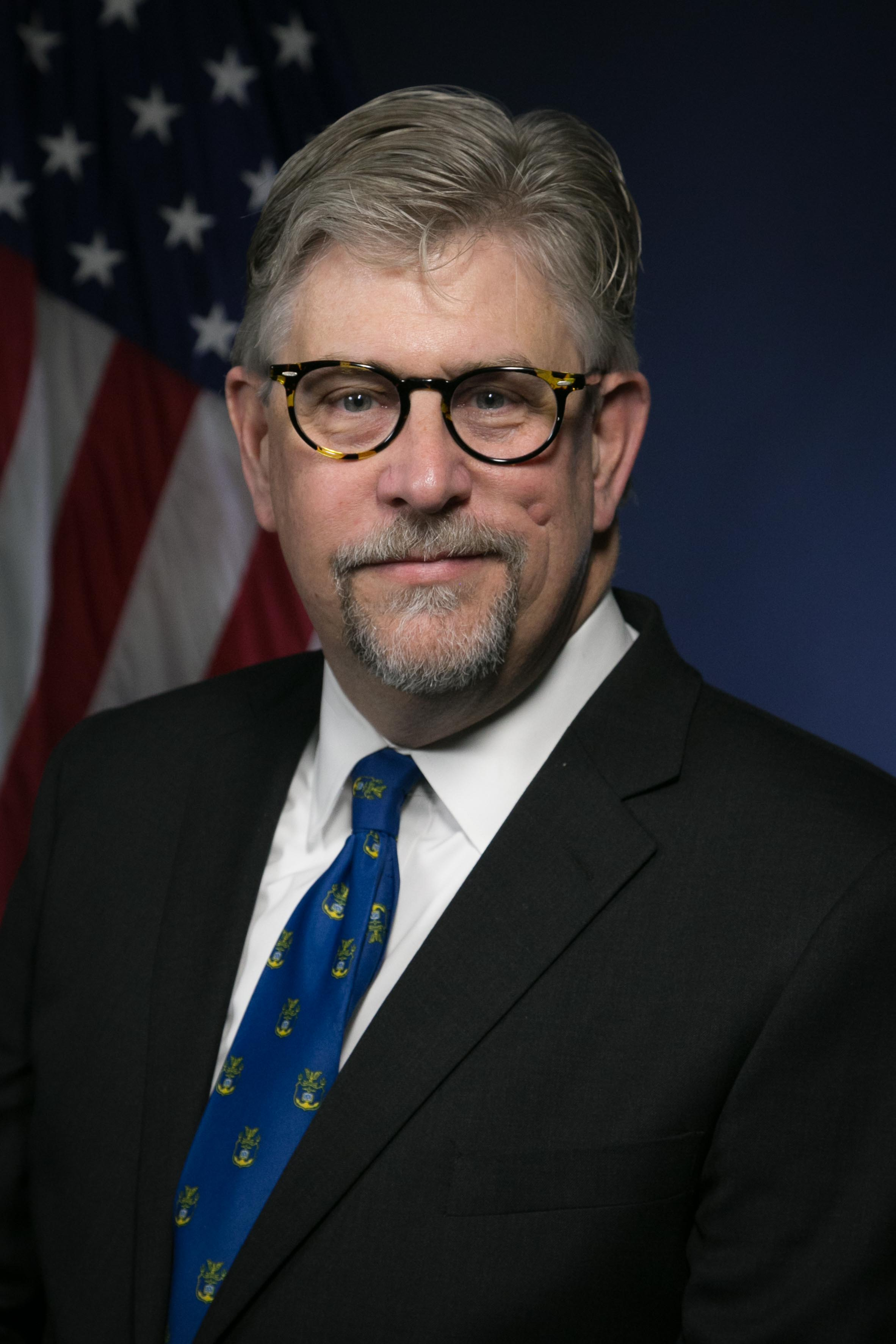

United States Attorney for the District of Alaska
- In office March 11, 2017 – February 28, 2021; Acting: March 11, 2017 – November 21, 2017
- President: Donald Trump; Joe Biden
- Preceded by: Karen L. Loeffler
- Succeeded by: S. Lane Tucker

Personal details
- Born: Bryan Douglas Schroder; February 3, 1959 (age 67)
- Education: United States Coast Guard Academy (BS); University of Washington (JD)

Military service
- Branch/service: United States Coast Guard
- Years of service: 1981–2005
- Rank: Captain
- Unit: Coast Guard Legal Division

Bryan Douglas Schroder (born February 3, 1959) is an American former military officer and attorney who served as the United States attorney for the District of Alaska from 2017 to 2021.

== Education ==
He earned a Bachelor of Science degree in government from the United States Coast Guard Academy in 1981 and a Juris Doctor from the University of Washington School of Law in 1991.

== Career ==
Schroder served 24 years in the United States Coast Guard (1981–2005) in Seattle, Long Beach, California, and San Diego. He then served as a judge advocate in Juneau, Anchorage, Miami, New York, and Colorado Springs. He retired as a captain. He is an Eagle Scout.

Schroder has worked at the U.S. Attorney's Office in the District of Alaska since 2005. Before becoming the U.S. attorney, he was the first assistant U.S. attorney, chief of the criminal division, anti-terrorism prosecutor, and district ethics adviser. He has prosecuted cases involving violent crimes, drug distribution, gun crimes, fraud, tax evasion, environmental crimes, and fisheries and wildlife offenses.

Schroder was nominated to be the United States attorney on July 27, 2017, and was confirmed by the United States Senate on November 9, 2017. On February 8, 2021, he along with 55 other attorneys were asked to resign two weeks after the inauguration of Joe Biden.
