= Grace Berg Schaible =

American lawyer and politician

Alaska Attorney General
- In office 1987–1989
- Governor: Steve Cowper
- Preceded by: Harold M. Brown
- Succeeded by: Douglas B. Baily

Personal details
- Born: Grace Lucile Berg; November 28, 1925 Tacoma, Washington, U.S.
- Died: June 9, 2017 (aged 91) Fairbanks, Alaska, U.S.
- Party: Democratic
- Spouse: Arthur Schaible (1958–1980; his death)
- Profession: Lawyer

Grace Berg Schaible (November 28, 1925 – June 9, 2017) was an American lawyer and politician. In 1987, she became Alaska's first female state attorney general, serving from 1987 to 1989. She also served as the chair of the Alaska Permanent Fund.

== Background ==
Grace Lucile Berg was the daughter of immigrant parents. Her father, Hans A. Berg, was from Otteren (near Davik), Nordfjord, Norway. Her mother, Mandis, hailed from a village near Lindesberg, Sweden. Both arrived in the United States separately in 1910. When her mother was seven months pregnant, she left the Alaska Territory and moved to Tacoma, Washington, where Berg was born on November 28, 1925. She returned to Alaska with her mother while she was still a baby. Although her parents were conservative Republicans, she would be a lifelong Democrat.

She attended public schools in Juneau and graduated from high school in May 1943. During her time in Juneau, she was a member of the local chapter of the International Order of the Rainbow for Girls. She joined in December 1938 and received the organization's highest honor, the Grand Cross of Color, in 1943. Rather than immediately enroll in college upon completing high school, she took time off to work. She would alternate between work and academic pursuits until she finished her studies at Yale Law School in January 1959.

Berg married the widowed Arthur Schaible on Christmas Day, 1958 at Fifth Avenue Presbyterian Church in New York City. He was a prominent physician in Alaska and head of the Alaska Native Health Services Hospital in Tanana.

== Career ==
After graduating from law school, Schaible clerked for the law firm of McNealy, Merdes, Camarot and Fitzgerald in Fairbanks before taking the bar exam in October 1959. Beginning in 1960, she practiced law for the firm, eventually becoming a partner. For nine years she simultaneously served as general counsel for Arctic Slope Regional Corporation.

In 1987, newly elected Governor Steve Cowper appointed Schaible to the post of state Attorney General, making her the first female attorney general in the state's history. She served in that capacity until 1989. Other positions she held include chair of the Alaska Permanent Fund, the first female to do so.

In 2009, Schaible was inducted into the inaugural class of the Alaska Women's Hall of Fame.

== See also ==
- List of female state attorneys general in the United States

Political offices
Preceded by Harold M. Brown	Attorney General of Alaska; 1987–1989	Succeeded by Douglas B. Baily
