= United States District Court for the District of Alaska =

Federal court for Alaska, United States

- (D. Alaska)

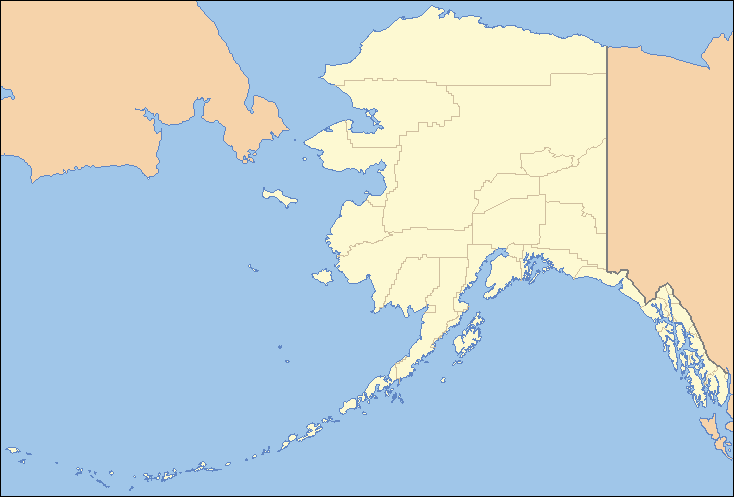
- Location: Anchorage More locations: Fairbanks; Hurff Ackerman Saunders Federal Building and Robert Boochever U.S. Courthouse (Juneau)
- Appeals to: Ninth Circuit
- Established: January 3, 1959
- Judges: 3
- Chief Judge: Sharon L. Gleason

Officers of the court
- U.S. Attorney: Michael J. Heyman
- U.S. Marshal: Robert Heun
- www.akd.uscourts.gov

The United States District Court for the District of Alaska (in case citations, D. Alaska) is a federal court that appeals to the Ninth Circuit (except for patent claims and claims against the U.S. government under the Tucker Act, which are appealed to the Federal Circuit).

The District was established on July 7, 1958, pending Alaska statehood on January 3, 1959.

The United States Attorney's Office for the District of Alaska represents the United States in civil and criminal litigation in the court. As of March 3, 2025 the United States attorney is Michael J. Heyman.

== Organization of the court ==
The United States District Court for the District of Alaska is the sole federal judicial district in Alaska. Court for the district is held at Anchorage, Fairbanks and Juneau. In 2021, the court discontinued the use of courthouses in Ketchikan and Nome.

== Current judges ==
As of February 10, 2026:

#	Title	Judge	Duty station	Born	Term of service			Appointed by
#	Title	Judge	Duty station	Born	Active	Chief	Senior	Appointed by
11	Chief Judge	Sharon L. Gleason	Anchorage	1957	2012–present	2022–present	—	Obama
13	District Judge	Aaron C. Peterson	Anchorage	1981	2026–present	—	—	Trump
14	District Judge	vacant	—	—	—	—	—	—
5	Senior Judge	H. Russel Holland	Anchorage	1936	1984–2001	1989–1995	2001–present	Reagan
7	Senior Judge	James K. Singleton	inactive	1939	1990–2005	1995–2002	2005–present	G.H.W. Bush
8	Senior Judge	John W. Sedwick	Anchorage	1946	1992–2011	2002–2009	2011–present	G.H.W. Bush
9	Senior Judge	Ralph Beistline	Anchorage	1948	2002–2015	2009–2015	2015–present	G.W. Bush
10	Senior Judge	Timothy M. Burgess	Anchorage	1956	2006–2021	2015–2021	2021–present	G.W. Bush

== Vacancies and pending nominations ==
Seat	Prior judge's duty station	Seat last held by	Vacancy reason	Date of vacancy	Nominee	Date of nomination
1	Anchorage	Joshua Kindred	Resignation	July 8, 2024	Kyle Reardon	September 14, 2026

== Former judges ==
#	Judge	Born–died	Active service	Chief Judge	Senior status	Appointed by	Reason for termination
1	Walter Hartman Hodge	1896–1975	1960–1966	1961–1966	1966–1975	Eisenhower	death
2	Raymond Eugene Plummer	1913–1987	1961–1973	1966–1973	1973–1987	Kennedy	death
3	James von der Heydt	1919–2013	1966–1984	1973–1984	1984–2013	L. Johnson	death
4	James Martin Fitzgerald	1920–2011	1974–1989	1984–1989	1989–2011	Ford	death
6	Andrew Kleinfeld	1945–2025	1986–1991	—	—	Reagan	elevation
12	Joshua Kindred	1977–present	2020–2024	—	—	Trump	resignation

== Chief judges ==
Chief judges have administrative responsibilities with respect to their district court. Unlike the Supreme Court, where one justice is specifically nominated to be chief, the office of chief judge rotates among the district court judges. To be chief, a judge must have been in active service on the court for at least one year, be under the age of 65, and have not previously served as chief judge.

A vacancy is filled by the judge highest in seniority among the group of qualified judges. The chief judge serves for a term of seven years, or until age 70, whichever occurs first. The age restrictions are waived if no members of the court would otherwise be qualified for the position.

When the office was created in 1948, the chief judge was the longest-serving judge who had not elected to retire, on what has since 1958 been known as senior status, or declined to serve as chief judge. After August 6, 1959, judges could not become or remain chief after turning 70 years old. The current rules have been in operation since October 1, 1982.

== Succession of seats ==
Seat 1
Seat established on January 3, 1959 by 72 Stat. 339
Hodge	1960–1966
von der Heydt	1966–1984
Holland	1984–2001
Beistline	2002–2015
Kindred	2020–2024
vacant	2024–present

Seat 2
Seat established on May 19, 1961 by 75 Stat. 80
Plummer	1961–1973
Fitzgerald	1974–1989
Singleton	1990–2005
Burgess	2006–2021
Peterson	2026–present

Seat 3
Seat established on July 10, 1984 by 98 Stat. 333
Kleinfeld	1986–1991
Sedwick	1992–2011
Gleason	2012–present

== Territorial District Court ==
From 1884 through 1959, the highest court in Alaska was a United States territorial court. In 1900, the court was enlarged from one to three judges, with each judge having a district. From 1900 till 1909, the districts were Juneau (First), Nome (Second), and Fairbanks (Third). In 1909, a fourth district and judge was added. From 1909 till 1959, the districts were Juneau (First), Nome (Second), Valdez and Anchorage (Third), and Fairbanks (Fourth).

#	District	Seat	Judge	State	Born–died	Active service	Appointed by	Reason for termination
1	—	Sitka and Wrangell	Ward McAllister Jr.	CA	1855–1908	1884–1885	Arthur	dismissal
2	—	Sitka and Wrangell	E. J. Dawne	OR	1844–?	1885	Cleveland	dismissal
3	—	Sitka and Wrangell	Lafayette Dawson	MO	1839–1897	1885–1888	Cleveland	resignation
4	—	Sitka and Wrangell	John H. Keatley	IA	1838–1905	1888–1889	Cleveland	resignation
5	—	Sitka and Wrangell	John S. Bugbee		1840–1896	1889–1892	B. Harrison	
6	—	Sitka and Wrangell	Warren Truitt		1849–1935	1892–1897	B. Harrison	
7	—	Sitka and Wrangell	Arthur Delaney		1841–1905	1895–1897	Cleveland	dismissal
8	—	Sitka and Wrangell	Charles S. Johnson		1854–1906	1897–1900	McKinley	
9	— 1	Sitka and Wrangell	Melville C. Brown		1838–1928	1900; 1900–1904	McKinley	
10	2	Nome	Arthur H. Noyes		1853–1915	1900–1902	McKinley	
11	3	Fairbanks	James Wickersham		1857–1939	1900–1907	McKinley	
12	2	Nome	Alfred S. Moore		1846–1920	1902–1910	T. Roosevelt	
13	1	Sitka and Wrangell (to 1906); Juneau (from 1906)	Royal Arch Gunnison		1873–1918	1904–1909	T. Roosevelt	
14	3	Fairbanks	Silas H. Reid		1870–1911	1908–1909	T. Roosevelt	
15	1	Juneau	Thomas R. Lyons		1867–1941	1909–1913	Taft	
16	3	Valdez and Anchorage	Edward E. Cushman		1865–1944	1909–1912	Taft	
17	4; 3	Fairbanks; Valdez and Anchorage	Pete Overfield		1874–1959	1909–1912; 1912–1913	Taft	
18	2	Nome	Cornelius D. Murane		1867–1951	1910–1913	Taft	
19	4	Fairbanks	Frederic E. Fuller		1868–1953	1912–1914	Taft	
20	1	Juneau	Robert W. Jennings		1864–1937	1913–1921	Wilson	
21	3	Valdez and Anchorage	Frederick M. Brown		1864–1946	1913–1921	Wilson	
22	2	Nome	John Randolph Tucker		1854–1926	1913–1917	Wilson	
23	4	Fairbanks	Charles E. Bunnell		1878–1956	1915–1921	Wilson	
24	2	Nome	William A. Holzheimer		1870–1948	1917–1921	Wilson	
25	3	Valdez and Anchorage	Elmer E. Ritchie		1861–1941	1921–1927	Harding	
26	2	Nome	Gudbrand J. Lomen		1854–1934	1921–1932	Harding	
27	1	Juneau	Thomas M. Reed Jr.		1857–1928	1921–1928	Harding	
28	4; 3	Fairbanks; Valdez and Anchorage	Cecil H. Clegg		1873–1956	1921–1932; 1932–1934	Harding	
29	3; 4	Valdez and Anchorage; Fairbanks	E. Coke Hill		1866–1961	1927–1932; 1932–1935	Coolidge	
30	1	Juneau	Justin Woodward Harding		1888–1976	1929–1934	Coolidge	
31	2	Nome	Lester O. Gore		1890–1965	1932–1934	Hoover	
32	1	Juneau	George F. Alexander		1882–1948	1933–1947	F. Roosevelt	
33	3	Valdez and Anchorage	Simon Hellenthal		1877–1955	1935–1945	F. Roosevelt	
34	4	Fairbanks	Harry Emerson Pratt		1884–1957	1935–1954	F. Roosevelt	
35	2	Nome	J. H. S. Morison		1864–1952	1935–1944	F. Roosevelt	
36	2	Nome	Joseph W. Kehoe		1890–1959	1944–1951	F. Roosevelt	
37	3	Valdez and Anchorage	Anthony Dimond		1881–1953	1945–1953	F. Roosevelt	
38	1	Juneau	George W. Folta		1893–1955	1947–1955	Truman	death
39	2	Nome	J. Earl Cooper		1907–1964	1952–1953	Truman	
40	3	Valdez and Anchorage	J. L. McCarrey Jr.		1906–1992	1953–1959	Eisenhower	court dissolution
41	2	Nome	Walter Hartman Hodge		1896–1975	1954–1959	Eisenhower	court dissolution
42	4	Fairbanks	Vernon D. Forbes		1905–1990	1954–1959	Eisenhower	court dissolution
43	1	Juneau	Raymond J. Kelly		1894–1979	1955–1959	Eisenhower	court dissolution

== U.S. Attorney ==
DISTRICT OF ALASKA, SITKA (1884–1898) E. W. Haskett (1884–1885) Mottrone D. Ball (1885–1887) Whitaker M. Grant (1887–1889) John C. Watson (1889) Charles S. Johnson (1889–1894) Lytton Taylor (1894–1895) Burton E. Bennett (1895–1898)

Three Judicial Districts Created: June 6, 1900 First District Juneau Robert A. Frederick (1898–1902) Thomas R. Lyons (1902–1903) John J. Boyce (1903–1910) John Rustgard (1910–1914 John J. Reagan (1914–1915) James A. Smiser (1915–1921) Arthur G. Shoup (1921–1927) Justin W. Harding (1927–1929) Howard D. Stabler (1929–1933) William A. Holzheimer (1933–1944) Lynn J. Gemmill (1944) Robert L. Jernberg (1944–1945) Robert L. Tollefson (1945–1946) Patrick J. Gilmore, Jr (1946–1954) Theodore E. Munson (1954–1956) Roger G. Connor (1956) C. Donald O’Connor (1956)

Second District Nome Joseph K. Wood (1900–1901) John L. McGinn (1901–1902) Melvin Grigsby (1902–1903) John L. McGinn (1903–1904) Henry M. Hoyt (1904–1908) George B. Grigsby (1908–1910) Bernard S. Rodey (1910–1913) F. M. Saxton (1913–1917) G. B. Mundy (1917–1918) Gudbrand J. Lomen (1918–1919) J. M. Clements (1919–1921) Wm. Frederick Harrison (1921–1929) Julius H. Hart (1929–1931) Leroy M. Sullivan (1931–1933) Hugh O’Neill (1933–1939) Charles J. Clasky (1939–1944) Frank C. Bingham (1944–1951) James A. von der Heydt (1951–1953) Russell R. Hermann (1953)

THIRD DISTRICT Eagle, Fairbanks, Valdez, Anchorage Alfred M. Post (1900–1901) Nathan V. Harlan (1901–1908) James J. Crossley (1908–1909) Corneilus D. Murane (1909–1910) George R. Walker (1910–1914) William N. Spence (1914–1917) William A. Munly (1917–1921) Sherman Duggan (1921–1925) Frank H. Foster (1925–1926) William D. Coppernoll (1926–1928) Warren N. Cuddy (1928–1933) Joseph W. Kehoe (1933–1942) Noel K. Wennblom (1942–1946) Raymond E. Plummer .... 1946–1949 Joseph E. Cooper (1949–1952) Seaborn J. Buckalew, Jr. (1952–1953) William J. Plummer (1953–1960)

Fourth District, Fairbanks James J. Crossley (1909–1914) Rhinehart F. Roth (1914–1921) Guy B. Erwin (1921–1924) Julien A. Hurley (1924–1933) Ralph J. Rivers (1933–1944) Harry O. Arend (1944–1949) Everett W. Hepp (1950–1952) Robert J. McNealy (1952–1953) Theodore F. Stevens (1954–1956) George M. Yeager (1956–1960)

ALASKA ADMITTED TO STATEHOOD JANUARY 2, 1959

- William T. Plummer (1960)
- George M. Yeager (1960–1961)
- Warren C. Colver (1961–1964)
- Joseph J. Cella, Jr (1964)
- Richard L. McVeigh (1964–1968)
- Marvin S. Frankel (1968–1969)
- A. Lee Preston (1969)
- Douglas B. Bailey 1969–1971
- G. Kent Edwards (1971–1977)
- James L. Swartz (1977)
- Alexander O. Bryner (1977–1980)
- Rene J. Gonzalez (1980–1981)
- Michael R. Spaan (1981–1989)
- Mark R. Davis (1989–1990)
- Wesley William Shea (1990–1993)
- Joseph W. Bottini (1993)
- Robert Charles Bundy (1994–?)
- Timothy Mark Burgess (2001–2005)
- Nelson P Cohen (2006–2009)
- Karen Louise Loeffler (2009–2017)
- Bryan Schroder (2017–2021)
- E. Bryan Wilson (2021–2022)
- S. Lane Tucker (2022–2025)
- Michael J. Heyman (2025–Present)

== See also ==
- Courts of Alaska
- List of current United States district judges
- List of United States federal courthouses in Alaska
