= James Martin Fitzgerald =

American judge (1920–2011)

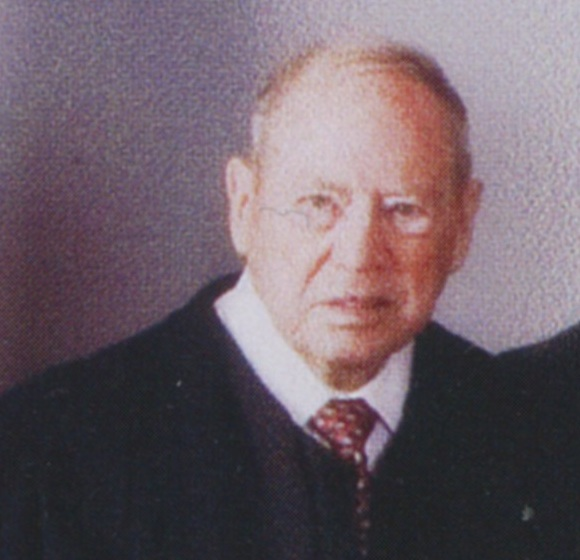

Senior Judge of the United States District Court for the District of Alaska
- In office January 1, 1989 – April 3, 2011

Chief Judge of the United States District Court for the District of Alaska
- In office 1984–1989
- Preceded by: James von der Heydt
- Succeeded by: H. Russel Holland

Judge of the United States District Court for the District of Alaska
- In office December 20, 1974 – January 1, 1989
- Appointed by: Gerald Ford
- Preceded by: Raymond Eugene Plummer
- Succeeded by: James K. Singleton

Personal details
- Born: James Martin Fitzgerald; October 7, 1920 Portland, Oregon
- Died: April 3, 2011 (aged 90) Santa Rosa, California
- Education: Willamette University (B.A.); Willamette University College of Law (LL.B.)

James Martin Fitzgerald (October 7, 1920 – April 3, 2011) was an American lawyer and judge. He served as an associate justice of the Alaska Supreme Court from 1972 to 1975, and resigned that position when he was appointed to serve as a United States district judge of the United States District Court for the District of Alaska.

== Education and career ==
Born on October 7, 1920, in Portland, Oregon, Fitzgerald was a private in the United States Army from 1940 to 1941. He was a sergeant in the United States Marine Corps from 1942 to 1946. He received a Bachelor of Arts degree in 1950 from Willamette University in Salem, Oregon. He received a Bachelor of Laws in 1951 from Willamette University College of Law. He was an assistant United States attorney for the Alaska Territory district from 1952 to 1956. He was the city attorney for Anchorage, Alaska from 1956 to 1959. He was legal counsel for Governor William A. Egan in 1959. Fitzgerald was the commissioner of public safety for the state of Alaska in 1959. He was a judge of the Third Judicial District of the Alaska Superior Court from 1959 to 1972, serving as presiding judge from 1969 to 1972. He was a justice of the Alaska Supreme Court from 1972 to 1975.

== Federal judicial service ==
On December 2, 1974, Fitzgerald was nominated by President Gerald Ford to be a judge of the United States District Court for the District of Alaska, to a seat vacated by Judge Raymond Eugene Plummer. Fitzgerald was confirmed by the United States Senate on December 18, 1974 and received his commission on December 20, 1974. He served as chief judge from 1984 to 1989 and assumed senior status on January 1, 1989. He stopped hearing cases in 2006, but remained in inactive senior status until his death on April 3, 2011, in Santa Rosa, California.

Legal offices
| Preceded by Raymond Eugene Plummer | Judge of the United States District Court for the District of Alaska; 1974–1989 | Succeeded by James K. Singleton |
| Preceded by James von der Heydt | Chief Judge of the United States District Court for the District of Alaska; 1984–1989 | Succeeded by H. Russel Holland |
