= Alaska Measure 2 =

Alaska Measure 2 may refer to:

- 1990 Alaska Measure 2, which criminalized marijuana
- 1998 Alaska Measure 2, which prohibited gay marriage
- 2014 Alaska Measure 2, which decriminalized marijuana
- 2020 Alaska Measure 2, which changed Alaskan primary elections to top-four variant non-partisan blanket elections (for the statewide level only) with ranked-choice voting
- 2026 Alaska Measure 2, which asks to repeal Alaska's electoral system of ranked-choice voting, nonpartisan blanket primaries, and campaign disclosure rules
