= Same-sex marriage in Alaska =

Same-sex marriage has been legally recognized in Alaska since October 12, 2014, with an interruption from October 15 to 17 while state officials sought without success to delay the implementation of a federal court ruling. The U.S. District Court for the District of Alaska held on October 12 in Hamby v. Parnell that Alaska's statutory and constitutional bans on same-sex marriage violated the Due Process and Equal Protection clauses of the U.S. Constitution. On October 15, state officials obtained a two-day stay from the Ninth Circuit Court of Appeals, which the U.S. Supreme Court refused to extend on October 17. Although Alaska is one of a few states which enforces a three-day waiting period between requesting a marriage license and conducting a marriage ceremony, at least three same-sex couples had the waiting period waived immediately after the district court's ruling. They married in Utqiaġvik and Ketchikan on October 13 and were the first same-sex couples to marry in Alaska.

Alaska had previously denied marriage rights to same-sex couples by statute since 1996 and in its State Constitution since 2004. Polling suggests that a majority of Alaskans support the legal recognition of same-sex marriage, with a 2024 Public Religion Research Institute poll showing that 70% of respondents supported same-sex marriage.

== Legal restrictions ==
=== Statutes ===
After the Hawaii Supreme Court seemed poised to legalize same-sex marriage in Hawaii in Baehr v. Miike in 1993, Representative Norm Rokeberg introduced legislation (House Bill 227) to the Alaska House of Representatives in March 1995 to add language restricting marriage to "the union of one man and one woman" in state statutes. The bill passed the House in February 1996. In March 1996, Senator Lynda Green introduced Senate Bill 30 to the Alaska Senate, which restricted marriage to "a civil contract between one man and one woman" and forbade the recognition of same-sex marriages performed elsewhere. It passed the Senate and the House shortly thereafter. Governor Tony Knowles did not veto the bill, but allowed it to become law without his signature on May 6, 1996. A bill to codify same-sex marriage in state statutes was introduced to the Alaska Legislature in February 2016. It would have replaced all references to "husband and wife" across state statutes with the gender-neutral term "spouses". Representative Andy Josephson said that Obergefell v. Hodges, the U.S. Supreme Court decision legalizing same-sex marriage nationwide, was "not reflected in state laws". The bill died without a vote. A similar bill was also unsuccessful in 2017.

=== Constitutional amendment ===
In 1998, the Alaska Legislature passed Ballot Measure 2, a constitutional amendment banning same-sex marriage, which was approved in a popular referendum on November 3, 1998. The amendment passed with 68% in favor and 32% opposed. The Alaska Civil Liberties Union attempted to prevent the referendum from proceeding, but in August 1998 the Alaska Superior Court held in Bess v. Ulmer that the proposed referendum and accompanying ballot description were legally permissible. Representative Josephson filed a bill to repeal the ban in January 2023, which if approved would have been presented to voters in November 2024. Citing the U.S. Supreme Court's decision in Dobbs v. Jackson Women's Health Organization, which overturned Roe v. Wade, in June 2022, Josephson said, "The Supreme Court for the first time in history, has removed civil rights. And we would be foolish to just watch them do it and not intervene to protect the civil liberties of our own citizens." The bill failed to pass before the end of the legislative session.

== Lawsuits ==
Same-sex marriage in the United States

=== Brause v. Alaska ===
In August 1994, Jay Brause and Gene Dugan, a same-sex couple from Anchorage, filed an application for a marriage license, which was denied by the Alaska Office of Vital Statistics. They filed suit in the Alaska Superior Court, arguing that their rights to privacy and equal protection—both of which are referenced in the Alaska Constitution—were violated by the office's refusal to allow them to marry. Superior Court Judge Peter Michalski ruled in February 1998 that "marriage, i.e., the recognition of one's choice of a life partner, is a fundamental right" and that "the state must...have a compelling interest that supports its decision to refuse to recognize the exercise of this fundamental right by those who choose same-sex partners rather than opposite-sex partners." Although the decision favored a right to same-sex marriage, it did not legalize the practice in the state or abolish Alaska's statutory ban on same-sex marriage. Rather, Judge Michalski directed the parties to set further hearings to determine whether a compelling state interest could be shown for Alaska's ban on same-sex marriage. Following the passage of Measure 2 in November 1998, the Alaska Supreme Court invalidated Brause and Dugan's claims, overturned the Superior Court's ruling in Brause, and dismissed the suit.

Brause and Dugan were married in Alaska 21 years later, on September 19, 2015, after the state's same-sex marriage ban was struck down in federal district court. Their wedding was held at the Pioneer School House in Anchorage. The couple married in Portland, Oregon in 2004 after Multnomah County began issuing marriage licenses to same-sex couples, but the marriage was later annulled by the Oregon Supreme Court. They also held marriage ceremonies in South Africa in 2006 and in Yukon in 2007.

=== Schmidt and Schuh v. Alaska ===
On April 25, 2014, the Alaska Supreme Court ruled that the state must provide property tax exemptions to same-sex couples just as to married opposite-sex couples. The decision said: "For purposes of analyzing the effects of the exemption program, we hold that committed same-sex domestic partners who would enter into marriages recognized in Alaska if they could are similarly situated to those opposite-sex couples who, by marrying, have entered into domestic partnerships formally recognized in Alaska". On July 25, it ruled that denying survivor's benefits to a deceased person's same-sex partner violated the survivor's right to equal protection.

=== Hamby v. Parnell ===
On May 12, 2014, five same-sex couples filed a lawsuit in the U.S. District Court for the District of Alaska challenging the state's same-sex marriage ban. The suit named Governor Sean Parnell as the primary defendant. The state's brief, filed on June 19, said that the questions the plaintiffs raised were political, not legal. It said that under the Tenth Amendment to the U.S. Constitution "Alaska has the right as a sovereign state to define and regulate marriage" and "Alaska voters had a fundamental right to decide the important public policy issue of whether to alter the traditional definition of marriage as between one man and one woman." District Court Judge Timothy Burgess heard oral arguments on October 10. On October 12, less than a week after the U.S. Supreme Court declined to review similar cases from the Ninth Circuit Court of Appeals, Latta v. Otter and Sevcik v. Sandoval, Judge Burgess ruled for the plaintiffs and declared Alaska's statutory and constitutional bans on same-sex marriage unconstitutional. He issued an injunction effective immediately. He wrote:

The Court then must determine whether Alaska's same-sex marriage laws significantly interfere with the Plaintiffs' right to marry whom they choose. The answer is obvious as to the unmarried Plaintiffs: the law prevents them from exercising that right. For many years, there have been powerful voices condemning homosexual conduct as immoral, but the Court's obligation in this case is not to determine or mandate a particular moral code, but rather "to define the liberty of all." While homosexuality and the union of same-sex couples through marriage may be against the beliefs or beyond the moral parameters of some Americans, the core purpose of the Fourteenth Amendment is to protect an individual's freedom by ensuring that a constitutional right is not "infringed simply because a majority of the people choose that it be." Alaska's laws prohibiting same-sex marriage "usurp, disregard, and disrespect" the fundamental right of all homosexuals to choose who to marry; a right of liberty, privacy, and association freely given to heterosexuals.

The same day, Governor Parnell announced that he would appeal the ruling and "defend our constitution". The head of the state Bureau of Vital Statistics commented: "The license application begins the three-day waiting period before the license can be issued. All marriages in Alaska must have the marriage license issued before the ceremony is performed. We expect our office will be busy tomorrow [October 13] but we will make every effort to help customers as quickly as possible." In Utqiaġvik, Magistrate Mary Treiber waived the state's three-day waiting period and married Kristine Hilderbrand and Sarah Ellis on October 13. They were the first same-sex couple to marry in Alaska. Another couple, Kelly Cahoon and Bernice Oyagak, were married in the same town later that day. A couple in Ketchikan, Chad Valadez and Jay Hochberg, also had the waiting period waived and were issued a license that day.

On October 13, the state asked the district court to issue a stay pending appeal, which was denied. On October 15, the Ninth Circuit Court of Appeals denied the state's request for an indefinite stay, granting instead a temporary stay until October 17 to allow Alaska to attempt to obtain a longer stay from the U.S. Supreme Court. The Supreme Court denied a stay and same-sex couples resumed obtaining marriage licenses following the dissolution of the Ninth Circuit's temporary stay on October 17. On October 22, the appellants asked the Ninth Circuit for an initial hearing en banc. This request was denied on November 18, when no circuit judge called for a vote on the motion within the time period set by circuit rules. On December 4, Attorney General Craig W. Richards was reported to be reviewing the case. Governor Bill Walker, who took office on December 1, said in a statement that he opposed spending on litigation with little chance of success. On February 9, 2015, the state asked the Ninth Circuit to stay proceedings pending action by the U.S. Supreme Court in Obergefell v. Hodges. The court did so on February 27. Following the ruling in Obergefell legalizing same-sex marriage nationwide in the United States on June 26, 2015, the Ninth Circuit accepted a joint notice to dismiss the appeal on July 1, filed by the state and the plaintiffs.

=== Smith v. Dunleavy et al ===
In 2019, Denali Nicole Smith filed suit in federal district court, alleging that the state was unlawfully enforcing statutes barring the recognition of same-sex marriages. Attorneys for Smith said she had been denied application for a state oil-wealth fund check, the Permanent Fund Dividend (PFD), because of her same-sex marriage. The lawsuit named Governor Mike Dunleavy and Attorney General Kevin Clarkson as defendants. In response, Governor Dunleavy said that "despite recent media reports to the contrary, neither the State of Alaska nor the Department of Revenue have a policy of denying PFDs based on same-sex marital status. The State's policy is that the unconstitutional statute currently on the books is not enforced, and if an individual is eligible under all the lawful criteria, he or she will receive a PFD." Attorney General Clarkson similarly stated that Smith should be eligible for a PFD, and the Department of Law opened an investigation into the case. Nicole Smith settled with the state, and the case was dismissed with prejudice by Judge H. Russel Holland on April 15, 2021.

== Alaska Native tribal entities ==
The Indian Civil Rights Act primarily aims to protect the rights of Native Americans but also reinforces the principle of tribal self-governance. While it does not grant sovereignty, the Act affirms the authority of tribes to govern their own legal affairs. Consequently, many tribes have enacted their own marriage and family laws. As a result, the Hamby ruling and the Supreme Court's Obergefell ruling did not automatically apply to tribal jurisdictions. The Central Council of the Tlingit and Haida Indian Tribes of Alaska became the first tribal government in Alaska to legalize same-sex marriage, when its governing board voted unanimously in February 2015 to legalize same-sex marriage on sovereign land. Council President Richard Peterson said, "If showing that we care about all of our tribal citizens equally can send a message where they feel included and belong and loved, and if that helps them to not want to turn toward suicide and other (harmful) things because they feel forsaken, then that's what we should do." Its Tribal Code (Haida: Kihl yahda; Tlingit: A káa ḵududziteeyi yoo x̱ʼatánk) reads: "Marriage is a civil and relational contract between two consenting persons".

Alaska Natives have deep-rooted marriage traditions, placing a strong emphasis on community, family and spiritual connections. While there are no records of same-sex marriages being performed in Native American cultures in the way they are commonly defined in Western legal systems, many Indigenous communities recognize identities and relationships that may be placed on the LGBT spectrum. Among these are two-spirit individuals—people who embody both masculine and feminine qualities. In some cultures, two-spirit individuals assigned male at birth wear women's clothing and engage in household and artistic work associated with the feminine sphere. Historically, this identity sometimes allowed for unions between two people of the same biological sex. The Tlingit refer to two-spirit people as ḵʼatx̱áan (pronounced [qʼʌ̀tʰχɒ́ːn]), the Haida as ḵʼadx̱áan (pronounced [qʼʌ̀d̥χáːn]), and the Tsimshian as ma̱hana̱ʼa̱x (pronounced [mɒhæˈnɒʔɒχ]). Among the Aleut, two-spirit individuals—known in their language as ayagigux̂ (pronounced [ˌajaˈɣiɣoχ])—wear women's clothing and "cop[y] all aspects of the feminine role", with such authenticity that "strangers to the tribe [are] not able to distinguish them from biological women". Marriages between ayagigux̂ and cisgender men, often a tribal chief, were commonplace, suggesting that such marriages had prestige value, "The husband regarded his ayagigux̂ as a major social accomplishment, and the family profited from association with their new wealthy in-law." Wealthy Aleut men usually maintained polygynous marriages, and so it is likely that the ayagigux̂ were not exclusive wives, but rather part of a polygynous marital relationship. Among the Yup'ik, male-bodied two-spirit people are known as arnaruaq (pronounced [ˈaʁnaʁu.aq], while female-bodied two-spirit people are known as angutnguaq (pronounced [aˈŋutŋ̊u.aq]). On St. Lawrence Island, two-spirit individuals, known as aghnaasiq (pronounced [ɑʁˈnɑːsiq]), wear women's clothing and traditionally occupied a cultural position as "especially powerful" shamans. The aghnaasiq could marry either men or women. The Alutiiq living on Kodiak Island believe that two-spirit individuals, known as arnauciq (pronounced [ˈaχˈnautʃiq]), are "two persons united in one", that they are more gifted than ordinary people and more skilled "at the respective tasks of both sexes than either men or women".

== Demographics and marriage statistics ==
Data from the 2000 U.S. census showed that 1,180 same-sex couples were living in Alaska. By 2005, this had increased to 1,644 couples, likely attributed to same-sex couples' growing willingness to disclose their partnerships on government surveys. Same-sex couples lived in all boroughs and census areas of the state, and constituted 0.9% of coupled households and 0.5% of all households in the state. Most couples lived in Anchorage, Fairbanks North Star and Matanuska-Susitna boroughs, but the regions with the highest percentage of same-sex couples were Denali (0.9% of all county households) and Bethel (0.8%). Same-sex partners in Alaska were on average younger than opposite-sex partners, and more likely to be employed. However, the average and median household incomes of same-sex couples were lower than different-sex couples, and same-sex couples were also far less likely to own a home than opposite-sex partners. More than 44% of same-sex couples in Alaska were raising children under the age of 18, with an estimated 1,335 children living in households headed by same-sex couples in 2005.

At least 828 same-sex marriages had been conducted in Alaska by the end of 2023. The 2020 U.S. census, which asked residents whether they were living with a "same-sex husband/wife/spouse" (Central Alaskan Yupʼik: arnaullgutminek/angutngullgutminek kassuucimalutek; Gwichʼin: dinjii, nichʼit hàa nihłeegaadii; Koyukon: denaa/sołtʼaanh – neełkkeʼl neeʼeeltaan kkaa; Iñupiaq: aipagiik agnaq/agnaq aŋun/aŋun) showed that there were 1,236 married same-sex couple households (466 male couples and 770 female couples) and 788 unmarried same-sex couple households in Alaska.

Number of marriages performed in Alaska
Year	Same-sex marriages	Opposite-sex marriages	Unspecified	Total marriages	% same-sex
2014	31	5,469	72	5,572	0.56%
2015	88	5,239	171	5,498	1.60%
2016	81	5,045	156	5,282	1.53%
2017	78	4,924	130	5,132	1.52%
2018	78	4,757	115	4,950	1.58%
2019	71	4,536	174	4,781	1.49%
2020	61	3,886	232	4,179	1.46%
2021	74	4,314	256	4,644	1.59%
2022	81	4,436	299	4,816	1.68%
2023	73	4,269	332	4,674	1.56%
2024	112	4,436	375	4,923	2.28%

== State employee benefits and partnerships ==
On October 28, 2005, the Supreme Court of Alaska ruled in Alaska Civil Liberties Union v. Alaska that state and local government programs violated the Alaska Constitution's equal protection provision by extending benefits to public employees' spouses but denying these same benefits to employees' domestic partners. The court held the programs unconstitutional because they denied benefits to people who were precluded, under Alaska's marriage laws, from becoming eligible to receive them. Since January 1, 2007, Alaska has provided some limited benefits to the same-sex partners of state employees. The city of Juneau has also created a domestic partnership registry for same-sex couples.

On November 17, 2006, the Alaska House of Representatives voted 24–10 in favor of legislation ordering a non-binding referendum for a constitutional amendment to deny benefits to the same-sex partners of state employees. On November 20, the Alaska Senate passed the bill in a 12–3 vote, and Governor Sarah Palin signed it into law on December 20. On April 3, 2007, voters, with 52.8% in favor and 48.8% opposed, directed the Alaska Legislature to put a constitutional amendment denying benefits to the same-sex partners of state employees on the ballot. A bill to place such an amendment on the November 2008 ballot stalled, and was eventually never voted on.

== Public opinion ==
Public opinion for same-sex marriage in Alaska
Poll source	Dates administered	Sample size	Margin of error	Support	Opposition	Do not know / refused
Public Religion Research Institute	March 13 – December 2, 2024	176 adults	?	70%	28%	2%
Public Religion Research Institute	March 9 – December 7, 2023	155 adults	?	75%	25%	<0.5%
Public Religion Research Institute	March 11 – December 14, 2022	?	?	70%	30%	<0.5%
Public Religion Research Institute	March 8 – November 9, 2021	?	?	72%	28%	<0.5%
Public Religion Research Institute	January 7 – December 20, 2020	186 adults	?	93%	3%	4%
Public Religion Research Institute	April 5 – December 23, 2017	287 adults	?	57%	34%	9%
Public Religion Research Institute	May 18, 2016 – January 10, 2017	573 adults	?	54%	36%	10%
Alaska Survey Research/Alaska Dispatch News	December 2016	750 adults	± 3.6%	69%	23.5%	7.5%
Public Religion Research Institute	April 29, 2015 – January 7, 2016	710 adults	?	60%	34%	6%
Public Religion Research Institute	April 2, 2014 – January 4, 2015	338 adults	?	54%	35%	11%
Edison Research	November 4, 2014	?	?	56%	41%	3%
New York Times/CBS News/YouGov	September 20 – October 1, 2014	593 likely voters	± 5.0%	50%	36%	14%
Public Policy Polling	July 31 – August 3, 2014	673 voters	± 3.8%	49%	45%	6%
Public Policy Polling	May 8–11, 2014	582 registered voters	± 4.1%	52%	43%	5%
Public Policy Polling	January 30 – February 1, 2014	850 registered voters	± 3.4%	47%	46%	7%
Public Policy Polling	February 4–5, 2013	1,129 voters	± 2.9%	43%	51%	6%

The December 2016 survey conducted by the Alaska Survey Research for the Anchorage Dispatch News showed that 69% of Alaska adults supported same-sex marriage, while 23.5% were opposed and 7.5% were undecided. Support was strongest in Southeast Alaska and Anchorage at 76%. 85% of Democrats supported same-sex marriage, while 13% were opposed; and 50% of Republicans supported it, with 41% opposed.

== See also ==
- LGBT rights in Alaska
- Same-sex marriage in the United States
