= Alaska Civil Liberties Union v. Alaska =

United States Supreme Court case

Alaska Civil Liberties Union v. State of Alaska
- Court: Alaska Supreme Court
- Full case name: Alaska Civil Liberties Union, Dan Carter and Al Incontro, Lin Davis and Maureen Longworth, Shirley Dean and Carla Timpone, Darla Madden and Karen Wood, Aimee Olejasz and Fabienne Peter-Contesse, Karen Sturnick and Elizabeth Andrews, Theresa Tavel and Karen Walter, Corin Whittemore and Gani Ruthellen, and Estra Bensussen and Carol Rose Gackowski v. State of Alaska and Municipality of Anchorage
- Decided: October 28, 2005
- Citation: 122 P.3d 781

Court membership
- Judges sitting: Alex Bryner, Walter L. Carpeneti, Robert Ladd Eastaugh, Dana Fabe, Warren Matthews

Keywords
- Same-sex marriage

Alaska Civil Liberties Union v. State of Alaska, 122 P.3d 781 (Ak. 2005), is an Alaska Supreme Court case holding that Alaska's Ballot Measure 2, which bans same-sex marriage, does not foreclose state equal protection claims brought on behalf of same-sex couples.

== Background ==
The State of Alaska and the municipality of Anchorage offers employment benefits to spouses of employees, but not to unmarried couples. The Alaska Civil Liberties Union and nine homosexual couples filed suit against Alaska and Anchorage in superior court, alleging that this denial violates their equal protection under the Alaska Constitution. The Superior Court denied the plaintiff's motion for summary judgment and granted the defendant's motion for summary judgment, on the grounds that "heightened scrutiny was unwarranted because the state and the municipality were discriminating between married and unmarried employees, not between opposite-sex and same-sex couples", that "a right to employee benefits, which it ruled was not a fundamental right", and that "the defendants had a legitimate interest in reducing costs, increasing administrative efficiency, and promoting marriage". Plaintiffs appealed to the Supreme Court.

== Court Ruling ==
On appeal, defendants argued that Ballot Measure 2 foreclosed plaintiffs' equal protection claims. The Court rejected that argument, on the basis that Measure 2 "does not explicitly or implicitly prohibit public employers from offering to their employees' same-sex domestic partners all benefits that they offer to their employees' spouses. It does not address the topic of employment benefits at all", nor was there "any legislative history implying that, despite its clear words, the Marriage Amendment should be interpreted to deny employment benefits to public employees with same-sex domestic partners". As such, that "the Marriage Amendment effectively prevents same-sex couples from marrying does not automatically permit the government to treat them differently in other ways."

The Court noted that it previously held that the state's equal protection clause "protects Alaskans' right to non-discriminatory treatment more robustly than does the federal equal protection clause". It agreed "with the plaintiffs that the proper comparison is between same-sex couples and opposite-sex couples, whether or not they are married." It then held that "the benefits programs are facially discriminatory". While it noted a "sliding-scale analysis for equal protection challenges in Alaska", it declined to rule on whether a higher standard of review was needed for sexual orientation classifications, as "the benefits programs cannot survive minimum scrutiny"

It first held that the employment benefits are "undeniably economic", and as such they receive "minimum scrutiny" if a suspect classification is not involved. The defendants argued that "they have three legitimate interests — cost control, administrative efficiency, and promotion of marriage — in limiting employment benefits to spouses and dependent children" But the Court did not "see how an absolute exclusion of same-sex domestic partners from being eligible for benefits is substantially related to this interest. Many same-sex couples are no doubt just as "truly close[ly] relat[ed]" and "closely connected" as any married couple... Although limiting benefits to "spouses," and thereby excluding all same-sex domestic partners, does technically reduce costs, such a restriction fails to advance the expressed governmental goal of limiting benefits to those in "truly close relationships" with and "closely connected" to the employee."

On administrative efficiency, the Court held that the "availability of these benefits elsewhere [in Alaska] persuades us that administrative difficulties are not an insurmountable barrier to providing benefits if our constitution requires that they be provided." Tbus, they concluded that "the absolute exclusion of same-sex couples is not substantially related to the goal of maximizing administrative efficiency".

On the asserted interest in promoting marriage, the Court rejected plaintiffs' contention that "the state is not truly interested in promoting marriage, because, if it were, it would not have prevented gays and lesbians from entering into married relationships", and noted that "just because the legislature did not want to promote same-sex marriage does not mean it did not have a sincere interest in promoting "traditional" marriage", and held that promoting marriage is at least a legitimate government interest. They then held that "restricting eligibility to persons in a status that same-sex domestic partners can never achieve — cannot be said to be related to that interest", noting that "[t]here is no indication here that denying benefits to public employees with same-sex domestic partners has any bearing on who marries. There is no indication here that granting or denying benefits to public employees with same-sex domestic partners causes employees with opposite-sex domestic partners to alter their decisions about whether to marry. There is no indication here that any of the plaintiffs, having been denied these benefits, will now seek opposite-sex partners with an intention of marrying them. And if such changes resulted in sham or unstable marriages entered only to obtain or confer these benefits, they would not seem to advance any valid reasons for promoting marriage."

The Court thus held that the denial of benefits violate equal protection.

The case was remanded to the superior court for a remedy.

== See also ==
- Alaska Ballot Measure 2 (1998)
- LGBT rights in Alaska
