= Article I, Section 25 =

Article I, Section 25 may refer to:

- 1998 Alaska Measure 2
- 2004 Michigan Proposal 04-2
