= Charlo Greene =

American businesswoman

- Born: Charlene Egbe; Lagos, Nigeria
- Education: University of Texas at Arlington (Bachelor's in Broadcast News)
- Occupations: Business owner, former reporter/anchor

Charlo Greene (born Charlene Egbe in Lagos, Nigeria) is a Nigerian-American businesswoman and former reporter/anchor for KTVA television in Anchorage, Alaska. Greene received media notice after she quit her job on-air in September 2014 while covering a story on the Alaska Cannabis Club, a medical cannabis organization, revealing that she was the owner of the business.

== Early life and education ==
Greene attended high school in Anchorage, Alaska, and earned a bachelor's degree in broadcast news from the University of Texas at Arlington.

== Career and on-air resignation ==
Greene worked as an intern and production assistant at KXAS and KDAF in Dallas prior to becoming an anchor/reporter for WOAY and WOWK in West Virginia, WRWR in Georgia, WJHL in Tennessee, and KTVA in Alaska.

In September 2014, Greene quit her job at KTVA on-air while covering a story on the Alaska Cannabis Club, a medical marijuana organization. In the news spot, Greene revealed that she was the owner of the club, and used profanity ("Fuck it, I quit") after explaining that she was quitting in order to devote more time to advocate for marijuana reform in Alaska. The resulting video went viral, accumulating several million views across various online platforms, and has raised criticism over Greene's conflict of interest as she had reported on her own business.

High Times awarded Greene its Courage in Media Award at its 40th anniversary party in New York on October 16, 2014. The same month, Elle listed Greene as one of the "13 Most Potent Women in the Pot Industry".

After her departure from KTVA, Greene opened an Indiegogo campaign to raise funds for marijuana reform, which raised over $10,000. She also worked with the Minority Cannabis Industry Association.

In December 2016 Greene moved to Los Angeles, where she hosts The Weed Show. As of 2021, Greene posts regularly to her Youtube channel dedicated to skin care.

== Legal problems ==
In November 2014, the Alaska Public Offices Commission served Greene with a subpoena, alleging that she had violated campaign finance disclosure laws regarding Alaska Measure 2 (2014), a measure that would legalize recreational marijuana use in Alaska. Greene objected to the subpoena, saying that the funds raised in her Indiegogo campaign were to be used toward worldwide marijuana advocacy and were not specifically earmarked for Ballot Measure 2. The commission rejected the subpoena, noting that while Greene's organization did not appear to violate campaign disclosure laws, she must still comply with the ongoing investigation.

In January 2015, Greene and the Alaska Cannabis Club were evicted from a building they had been renting, a former Kodiak Bar and Grill location in Anchorage, for failing to obtain insurance in a timely manner.

Greene's cannabis club was raided in June 2016 by local police. She was subsequently arrested and charged with several counts of misconduct involving a controlled substance. In 2018 she pled guilty to one count, a felony, and was sentenced with a $10,000 fine but no jail time.
