= Noy v. State =

Noy v. State, 83 P.3d 538, is a case decided by the Alaska Court of Appeals in 2003. David S. Noy was convicted of possessing less than eight ounces of marijuana by a jury. However, in 1975, the Alaska Supreme Court ruled in Ravin v. State that possessing less than four ounces of marijuana in one's home is protected by the Alaska Constitution's privacy clause. The amount possessed being over four ounces was highly in question on appeal. Thus, the Alaska Court of Appeals overturned Noy's conviction and struck down the part of the law criminalizing possession of less than four ounces of marijuana.

== Background ==
David S. Noy, a resident of North Pole, Alaska, was contacted by the North Pole Police Department at his home and was told the police smelled growing marijuana. The police searched Noy's home and found approximately eleven ounces of marijuana. He was charged of possession of more than eight ounces of marijuana. However, a jury convicted Noy of possessing less than eight ounces of marijuana based on the presented evidence. Noy appealed the conviction, citing the Alaska Supreme Court case of Ravin v. State. Alaska initially followed Ravin, by decriminalizing less than four ounces of in-home possession in 1975. However, in 1990 a successful ballot measure re-criminalized marijuana. This law was the basis for Noy's conviction.

== Appeal ==
On August 29, 2003, the Alaska Court of Appeals reversed Noy's conviction. They cited the Alaska Supreme Court's decision in Ravin and ruled unconstitutional the part of the law criminalizing possession of more than four ounces of marijuana in one's home. The unanimous three-judge panel concluded their ruling by stating, "To make AS 11.71.060(a)(1) consistent with article I, section 22 of the Alaska Constitution as interpreted in Ravin, we must limit the scope of the statute. As currently written, the statute prohibits possession of any amount of marijuana. But with regard to possession of marijuana by adults in their home for personal use, AS 11.71.060(a)(1) must be interpreted to prohibit only the possession of four ounces or more of marijuana."

== Aftermath ==
Noy remains only the second case in the United States to hold possession of marijuana is protected by a state constitution, following the precedent of Ravin. In 2006, the Alaska Legislature re-criminalized the possession of more than one ounce of marijuana in one's home. Voters sued about this statute, but in April 2009 the Alaska Supreme Court ruled they must await an actual prosecution before they were allowed to rule on the constitutionality of the law. In November 2014, Alaska voters legalized the possession, taxation, and regulation of marijuana sales. This ballot measure effectively reaffirms the holding of both Ravin and Noy, and voids the 2006 statute by the Alaska Legislature.
