= List of on-air resignations =

This is a list of on-air resignations. These are resignations in the public eye.

== On radio ==
- 1960 - Norm Kraft, the farm broadcaster at WGN, resigned his position on-air to join the John F. Kennedy presidential campaign. His successor, Orion Samuelson, would hold the position the next 60 years.
- October 1967 and again in 1985 – Announcer and DJ William "Rosko" Mercer resigned on-air twice: first from WOR-FM in New York City in October 1967 over the station's employment of radio consultants; and then again in 1985, when he left WKTU-FM in Lake Success, New York, while on the air, again over a dispute with the station management.
- April 24, 1972 - Jim Santella, evening host at WPHD-FM in Buffalo, New York, resigned in response to corporate criticism of his long, conversational interludes and a major cut to his music library as the station shifted from underground to album-oriented rock.
- November, 1991 – Terry Durney became the first radio presenter in the United Kingdom to resign live on-air. He presented the weekend request programme on BBC Radio Lancashire. He cited the reason as the station's new management team who were making the station a more "speech and sport" broadcaster.
- August, 1992 - DJ Dani Elwell resigned from Toronto radio station CFNY-FM, by reading her resume live on the air. This occurred during a lengthy period of low staff morale at the station, in the wake of multiple format and ownership changes.
- August 8, 1993 – Dave Lee Travis, BBC Radio 1 DJ resigned on-air, citing "There are changes being made at the station that go against my principles" in reference to Matthew Bannister's plans for the station.
- September 24, 2001 – Rugby player Mal Meninga's attempted political career lasted a mere 28 seconds. Becoming fazed in his first radio interview announcing his entrance into the 2001 Australian Capital Territory election, he resigned as a candidate on-air shortly after the broadcast commenced.
- January, 2001 – Juan González, a journalist from the Pacifica Radio Network, announced his resignation whilst co-hosting Democracy Now!, in protest over "harassment and muzzling of free speech." González has frequently returned to the program since then.
- August, 2006 – Inetta Hinton, a presenter on WBLX-FM in Mobile, Alabama, resigned on-air with the phrase "I quit this bitch."
- November, 2006 – Bob "The Blade" Robinson, a presenter on WRDU in Knightdale, North Carolina, resigned on the air after Clear Channel Communications switched the format of the station he was on for 22 years from rock to country. He played "The Song Is Over" by The Who and then left after the song was cut off.
- February, 2008 – Lucas Campbell, a presenter of "Rock of Ages" on Chorley FM, resigned on-air after station chiefs decided to shift the show to a later slot.
- February 9, 2014 – Dublin, Ireland 2FM presenter and former station boss John Clarke quit his daytime Sunday show in dramatic fashion, telling listeners he was "reading the signs" and implying he was leaving the programme before he was forced out.

== On television ==
- February 10, 1960 – Host Jack Paar announced his resignation from The Tonight Show and walked off during mid-broadcast, after discovering NBC had censored a joke. Paar returned one month later.
- July, 1997 – Alan Towers resigned from UK regional news programme BBC Midlands Today, telling viewers the BBC was "led by pygmies in grey suits wearing blindfolds."
- November, 2012 – Cindy Michaels and Tony Consiglio, anchors from ABC affiliate WVII-TV in Bangor, Maine, resigned on-air, citing "some recent developments (that) have come to our attention."
- March, 2014 – Liz Wahl resigned from RT America on-air to protest the network's coverage of Russia's annexation of Crimea.
- September 21, 2014 – Charlo Greene, a reporter from CBS affiliate KTVA in Anchorage, Alaska, declared herself as the president of the medical cannabis organization Alaska Cannabis Club, which campaigned successfully for the legalization of the drug in the state via a November 2014 referendum. She ended the outro with a profane statement, resigned on-air and walked off the set.
- October 19, 2019 – Shepard Smith, an anchor for Fox News and host of the Fox Report, resigned on-air after 24 years at Fox, after frequently criticizing and being criticized by President Donald Trump.
- March 2, 2020 – Chris Matthews, host of MSNBC's long-running show Hardball with Chris Matthews, abruptly retired on-air after sexual harassment allegations and controversial critiques of 2020 Democratic Party presidential primary candidates Bernie Sanders and Elizabeth Warren.
