= 2018 Municipality of Anchorage, Alaska, Proposition 1 =

Proposition 1
- April 3, 2018

Results
| Choice | Votes | % |
|---|---|---|
| Yes | 36,993 | 47.36% |
| No | 41,115 | 52.64% |
| Valid votes | 78,108 | 98.50% |
| Invalid or blank votes | 1,187 | 1.50% |
| Total votes | 79,295 | 100.00% |
| Registered voters/turnout | 218,388 | 36.31% |
Precinct results
Yes
60–70%
50–60%
No
80–90%
70–80%
60–70%
50–60%
Other
Tie
- Source: "Election Summary Report 2018 Regular Municipal Election" (PDF), Municipality of Anchorage, November 3, 2018

Proposition 1 was a 2018 direct initiative bathroom bill in Anchorage, Alaska. A public vote on the proposition was held on April 3, 2018. It would have made it legal for "any employer, public accommodation, or other person to establish and enforce sex-specific standards or policies concerning access to intimate facilities such as locker rooms, showers, changing rooms, and restrooms." The measure defined the term 'sex' as "an individual's immutable biological condition of being male or female, as objectively determined by anatomy and genetics at the time of birth."

The proposition was the result of a petition campaign led by Alaska Family Action, a Christian public policy organization. The group organized a petition titled "Regulating Access to Facilities Such as Locker Rooms and Bathrooms on the Basis of Sex at Birth, Rather Than Gender Identity." The Anchorage Municipal Clerk's Office certified over 6,200 valid signatures on the petition and authorized the referendum in July 2017. Local opponents of the bill were led by Fair Anchorage, a coalition of organizations.

Anchorage voters rejected Proposition 1 by a vote of 52.64% to 47.36%.

== See also ==
- Bathroom bill
- LGBT rights in Alaska
