= Model State Constitution =

Suggested model (example) for how to write a constitution

- Created: 1921; 105 years ago
- System: Republic

Government structure
- Branches: Three
- Chambers: Bicameral
- Federalism: Unitary

History
- Amendments: Six
- Last amended: 1963
- Author(s): National Civic League

The Model State Constitution is "an ideal of the structure and contents of a state constitution that emphasizes brevity and broad functions and responsibilities of government," according to Ann O'M Bowman and Richard Kearney in State and Local Government.

The National Municipal League (now the National Civic League) first developed the Model State Constitution in 1921 to advocate constitutional reform based on a "higher-law tradition" (a state constitutional tradition based on basic and enduring principles that reach beyond statutory law) as opposed to "Positive Law Tradition" (a state constitutional tradition based on detailed provisions and procedure). The National Municipal League would revise the Model State Constitution five times with the last revision - the sixth version published in 1963. It does not promote partisan ideals or a particular political ideology but rather a simplistic, more concise, and more readable outline for state fundamental law that seeks to remain flexible to deal with emerging problems.

== Articles ==
The Model State Constitution has twelve basic articles:

- Bill of rights
- Power of the state
- Suffrage and elections
- Legislative branch
- Executive branch
- Judicial branch
- Finance
- Local government
- Public education
- Civil service
- Intergovernmental relations
- Constitutional revision

The Constitution of Alaska was partially inspired by the Model state constitution.

== See also ==
- Model act (model legislation)
