= Model act =

Suggested example for how to write a law well

A model act, also called a model law or a piece of model legislation, is a suggested example for a law, drafted centrally to be disseminated and suggested for enactment in multiple independent legislatures. The motivation classically has been the hope of fostering more legal uniformity among jurisdictions, and better practice in legislative wording, than would otherwise occur; another motivation sometimes has been lobbying disguised under such ideals. Model laws can be intended to be enacted verbatim, to be enacted after minor modification, or to serve more as general guides for the legislatures.

Model laws are especially prevalent in federations because the federal subjects (for example, states, provinces, or other subjects) are autonomous or semi-autonomous but nonetheless can benefit from a substantial degree of uniformity of laws among jurisdictions. For example, in the United States, because the country consists of 50 semi-autonomous states, each with its own legislature and set of laws, avoidance of needless variation is valuable, reserving variation only to essential autonomous differences. There, model laws are referred to as model acts or model bills. Many American special interest groups draft model acts which they lobby lawmakers to pass. In particular, the conservative American Legislative Exchange Council (ALEC) has successfully gotten hundreds of model acts passed since 2010. Uniform acts are model acts intended to be enacted exactly as written. They are drafted by the Uniform Law Commission (ULC), a state-run non-profit organization whose purpose is to draft laws in areas where uniformity is important (for example, to facilitate interstate commerce).

The concept is not specific to federations, and international organizations such as the United Nations Commission on International Trade Law, the International Red Cross and Red Crescent Movement, and the European Union have also written model laws to harmonize laws between different countries.

Although model acts inherently can serve valid purposes (such as for uniform justice, with less capriciousness), their distortion into disguised lobbying has been criticized. American critics of such model laws have thus referred to them as "copycat laws", "fill-in-the-blanks laws", and "copy-paste laws". The concept caused some controversy in 2019 when a coalition of 30 investigative journalists published a series called "Copy, Paste, Legislate", investigating the corporate interests behind many model laws.

== American drafters of model law ==
=== Harry H. Laughlin's Model Eugenical Sterilization Law ===
One early example of a model law was eugenicist Harry H. Laughlin's Model Eugenical Sterilization Law. In 1922, he published the book Eugenical Sterilization in the United States whose purpose was to persuade state legislatures into passing sterilization laws, which it also did. In chapter XV of the book he included the bill Model Eugenical Sterilization Law. Two years later, Laughlin's sterilization act was enacted almost unmodified by the Virginia Sterilization Act of 1924. The Supreme Court upheld the constitutionality of the law in Buck v. Bell in 1927, paving the way for similar sterilization laws in other states.

=== Uniform Law Commission ===
The non-profit Uniform Law Commission (ULC), formerly known as the National Conference of Commissioners on Uniform State Laws, was founded in 1892 to provide American jurisdictions with robust legislation. ULC promotes enactment of uniform acts in areas of state law where uniformity is desirable and practical. ULC produces both model and uniform acts. Since its inception it has produced over 250 uniform acts.

ULC drafted the Model Tribal Secured Transactions Act in 2005 which served as a template for tribal legal infrastructure on reservations to provide consistency and greater accessibility in lending and credit transactions.

=== American Bar Association ===
The American Bar Association is an association of American lawyers and law students which has published a large number of model acts. Its most successful model law is probably the Model Business Corporation Act published in 1950. As of 2020, the act is followed by 24 states. Another influential act ABA has drafted is the 1979 Model Procurement Code for State and Local Governments, which as of 2000 had been adopted in full by 16 states and in part by several more. The act went through a major update in 2000.

Other model acts drafted by ABA include the Model Airspace Act in 1973, and the Model Code for Public Infrastructure Procurement in 2007.

=== American Law Institute ===
The American Law Institute (ALI) is most famous for its Restatements of the Law but has also produced model acts. A well-known example is the Model Penal Code published in 1962 seeking to harmonize state criminal law.

=== American Legislative Exchange Council ===
The American Legislative Exchange Council (ALEC) an American nonprofit organization—whose members include conservative state legislators and private sector representatives—is a prolific producer of model state-level laws for conservative causes. ALEC has deep ties to the State Policy Network (SPN), an umbrella organization for a consortium of conservative and libertarian think tanks that focus on state-level policy, which is one of ALEC's sponsors.

One of ALEC's earliest model acts were the 1981 Animal and Ecological Terrorism Act to prohibit acts that would make agricultural business operations more difficult. The act sought to impose harsh penalties, including a terrorism registry, on instances of direct action performed by organizations such as the Animal Liberation Front.

ALEC's model acts concern many topics important to conservatives like Stand Your Ground, Voter ID, illegal immigration, truth in sentencing, three strikes, right to know, and cutting taxes. ALEC has drafted and distributed state-level legislation to limit. It has also opposed the creation or expansion of municipal broadband networks.

ALEC has been very successful in getting its laws passed; according to Brendan Greeley, lawmakers introduce bills based on the organization's model acts about 1,000 times per year in state legislatures and about 200 of them become law. In 2015, ALEC model bills were reflected in about 172 measures introduced in 42 states, according to the Center for Media and Democracy, publishers of the ALEC Exposed series.

ALEC has also been criticized for being funded by big corporations and over alleged underhandedness. The Guardian has described it as a "dating agency for Republican state legislators and big corporations" to "frame rightwing legislative agendas".

== Notable model acts ==
Some notable model acts not drafted by the above-mentioned organizations:

- National Notary Association provided the draft for the Uniform Notary Act in 1973. It was renamed to the Model Notary Act and expanded in 1984, 2002, and 2010. The act has been adopted in its entirety in several jurisdictions.
- The United States Department of Justice issued the Revised Model Tribal Sex Offender Registry Code/Ordinance in 2017. It offered guidelines to American Indian tribes on how to implement the Adam Walsh Child Protection and Safety Act.
- The National Association of Civil-Law Notaries issued the Model Civil Law Notary Act to streamline law relating to civil law notary. The act has been enacted in Alabama and Florida.
- The National Association of Insurance Commissioners's issued the Uniform Health Carrier External Review Model Act. The 2010 Patient Protection and Affordable Care Act requires states to enact laws based on the model act.
- President Franklin D. Roosevelt wrote the Standard State Soil Conservation Districts Law, a model act he submitted to the states. It led to the establishment of the New York State Soil and Water Conservation Committee on April 23, 1940, and the soil and water conservation districts were authorized with the enactment of the Soil Conservation District Law, a law based on that model act.
- The Tenther movement in 2013 and 2014, introduced bills based on their model act the Fourth Amendment Protection Act in several state legislatures via Republican and Democratic lawmakers. The intent of the bills was to prevent state governments from co-operating with the National Security Agency's mass surveillance program.
- In 2006, the National Auctioneers Association proposed the Uniform Auction and Auctioneer Licensing Act, model legislation governing auctions and auctioneers.
- The National Committee on Uniform Traffic Laws and Ordinances introduced and periodically updates Uniform Vehicle Code.
- Model State Emergency Health Powers Act, drafted by the Centers for Disease Control and Prevention in 1999.
- Federal Rules of Civil Procedure (FRCP), published in 1938 to harmonize the rules governing civil procedure. 35 states have adopted rules based on FRCP.
- Partisanship Out of Civics Act (POCA), published in February 2021 by the National Association of Scholars (NAS) by Stanley Kurtz—National Review education writer and Senior Fellow at the Ethics and Public Policy Center—to limit the teaching of critical race theory in schools. This model bill, particularly Section 7—which specifically bans certain concepts—has been incorporated into state legislation in Idaho, Oklahoma, Iowa, Tennessee, Texas, Florida, Montana, Utah, Georgia, and South Carolina.

== International model laws ==
An example of an international model law is the UNCITRAL Model Law on International Commercial Arbitration. Model legislative provisions on privately financed infrastructure projects were drafted by UNCITRAL and recommended for states to use by the United Nations General Assembly in 2004. Other UNCITRAL Legislative Guides, which make recommendations for efficient approaches to addressing an area of law within a national or local context, are listed at United Nations Commission on International Trade Law#Legislative Guides.

== "Copy, Paste, Legislate" ==
In 2019, a team of 30 reporters from the Center for Public Integrity (CPI), USA TODAY, and The Arizona Republic published the result of a two-year-long investigation into model acts entitled "Copy, Paste, Legislate". The investigation raised concerns over the role of ALEC and other corporate-sponsored organizations on the American legislative process.

The investigation used text analysis software called Legislative Influence Detector created by Joe Walsh, a former data scientist at the University of Chicago to spot similarities between model acts and enacted legislation. Its main finding was that during the period 2010 to 2018 lawmakers had introduced bills based on model acts at least 10,000 times. Another 10,000 bills were likely copied but were more dissimilar. The investigation identified over 2,100 model acts but speculated that the real number is far higher since many organizations keep their model acts secret. In many states, the use of model bills was found to have supplanted the traditional way of writing legislation "from scratch".

Mississippi was found to be the state with the highest number of bills introduced based on model acts, 744 - 200 more than the next highest state. 288 came from the non-partisan Council of State Governments and 255 from ALEC. But only 57 of them became law, according to the investigation.

=== Open recall disclosure ===
The "Copy, Paste, Legislate" investigation uncovered a legal initiative by the car industry to enact laws that would require dealers to disclose if a bought used car were under open recall, something most states do not require. The car industry's initiative was in response to other legal initiatives that called for banning the sales of used cars under open recall entirely.

The first bill produced by the initiative was introduced in 2014 by New Jersey Speaker, Paul D. Moriarty and called for "a fine for failing to disclose open recalls to customers." It was based on model law that had been crafted by a lobbyist who headed the New Jersey Coalition of Automotive Retailers. The lobbyist said that their "model legislation" provided "suggested language" and was never intended to be a copy-and-paste exercise." Similar model legislation was drafted by the Washington, D.C.–based Automotive Trade Association Executives (ATAE), representing over 100 "executives from regional auto dealer associations". The bill allowed dealers to continue selling recalled cars as long as they disclosed open recalls. The dealers worked with over 600 lobbyists in 43 states to assist in getting the legislation passed. From 2014 through 2019, lawmakers in eleven states introduced similar bills into their state legislatures.

=== "Right-to-try" ===
The libertarian Arizona-based Goldwater Institute, drafted the "right-to-try" law that was signed into law in Ohio in 2016 by then-Governor John Kasich. It allows patients with terminal illnesses to try drugs that the federal Food and Drug Administration has not approved. The law was passed on the federal level in 2018.

=== Anti-BDS laws ===
The "Copy, Paste, Legislate" investigation also documented the Israel lobby's largely successful attempts to get statehouses to pass legislation to curb the Palestinian-led BDS movement. BDS calls for comprehensive boycotts of Israel until it stops its human rights violations against Palestinians. The legislation that the Israel lobby promotes requires state contractors to pledge not to boycott Israel and state pension funds to divest from entities that do.

One of the first anti-BDS law was sponsored by Republican lawmaker Alan Clemmons who introduced it in 2015. He worked with the Israeli-American Coalition for Action's (AIC) Joe Sabag, his "buddy and wordsmith-in-chief", to prepare the bill. Eugene Kontorovich, a George Mason University law professor, assisted in drafting the legislation. He also helped other states with their anti-BDS laws and frequently defends their constitutionality in the media. By May 2019, 25 other states had adopted similar measures. Many of the bills shared exact wording. The anti-BDS initiatives, undertaken by activist groups concerned about the rise of antisemitism, such as the Jewish Federations of North America (JFNA) and the Israeli-American Coalition for Action, have been largely successful in pushing the anti-boycott legislation through state legislatures, according to a two-year collaborative investigative journal report. A JFNA lobbyist wrote the "anti-boycott executive order and news release" for the governor of Louisiana. A pro-Israel lobbyist closely helped edit the bill and guided the lawmaker who introduced and supported the anti-boycott legislation in Nevada.

== See also ==
- Conflict of laws
- EU Harmonization, a somewhat similar concept in European Union law
- Model State Constitution
- Project Blitz
- Uniform act
