= LGBTQ rights in Alaska =

- Alaska (USA)
- Legal status: Legal since 1980
- Gender identity: Transgender people allowed to change legal gender, surgery not required
- Discrimination protections: Sexual orientation and gender identity covered in employment anti-discrimination laws statewide since 2020 (Bostock v. Clayton County)

Family rights
- Recognition of relationships: Same-sex marriage since 2014 (Hamby v. Parnell)
- Adoption: Same-sex couples allowed to adopt since 2014 (Hamby v. Parnell)

Lesbian, gay, bisexual, transgender, and queer (LGBTQ) rights in the U.S. state of Alaska have evolved significantly over the years. Since 1980, same-sex sexual conduct has been allowed, and same-sex couples can marry since October 2014. The state offers few legal protections against discrimination on the basis of sexual orientation and gender identity, leaving LGBTQ people vulnerable to discrimination in housing and public accommodations; however, the U.S. Supreme Court's ruling in Bostock v. Clayton County established that employment discrimination against LGBTQ people is illegal under federal law. In addition, four Alaskan cities, Anchorage, Juneau, Sitka and Ketchikan, representing about 46% of the state population, have passed discrimination protections for housing and public accommodations.

Recent opinion polls have shown increasing levels of support for LGBT rights and same-sex marriage. A 2017 Public Religion Research Institute poll found a 57% majority and a 65% majority in favor of same-sex marriage and anti-discrimination legislation, respectively. In 2018, voters in Anchorage rejected a voter initiative which would have stripped discrimination protections from transgender individuals.

== History and legality of same-sex sexual activity ==
Alaska Native people have long had traditions of cross-dressing practices. The Aleut people recognize people born as male but who act, dress and behave as female, referred to as ayagigux̂ (literally man transformed into a woman). Tayagigux̂ (literally woman transformed into a man) refers to people assigned female at birth but who act and behave as male. Ayagigux̂ and tayagigux̂ have historically played certain important communal roles. Other people groups recognize similar terms in reference to transgender people and gender variance; male-to-female individuals are aranu'tiq among the Alutiiq, anasik among the Siberian Yupik, gatxan among the Tlingit, kanâ'ts among the Tshimshian, and aranaruaq among the Central Alaskan Yup'ik, whereas female-to-male individuals are uktasik among the Siberian Yupik, and angutnguaq among the Yup'ik. Nowadays, similarly to Canada, the term "two-spirit" is used to refer to people who embody these gender traits.

After being purchased by the United States in 1867, the Department of Alaska had no criminal laws whatsoever for the following 17 years. In 1884, the United States Congress enacted a statute giving Alaska all the laws of Oregon. This included a provision criminalizing sodomy, whether heterosexual or homosexual, with a penalty of up to five years' imprisonment. The aforementioned customs of the Alaska Natives caused "alarm" in Congress. These customs, labelled "appalling degradation and vice" by Congress, resulted in an official investigation by a Senate committee, and in 1899 the enactment of a specific sodomy statute for Alaska. "Crime against nature", as it was called, was punishable by up to ten years in jail. In 1973, the Alaska Supreme Court held that oral sex did not violate the sodomy statute.

In total, there have only been five recorded sodomy cases in Alaska; three of which involved heterosexual conduct and two homosexual conduct. Alaska repealed its sodomy law on January 1, 1980.

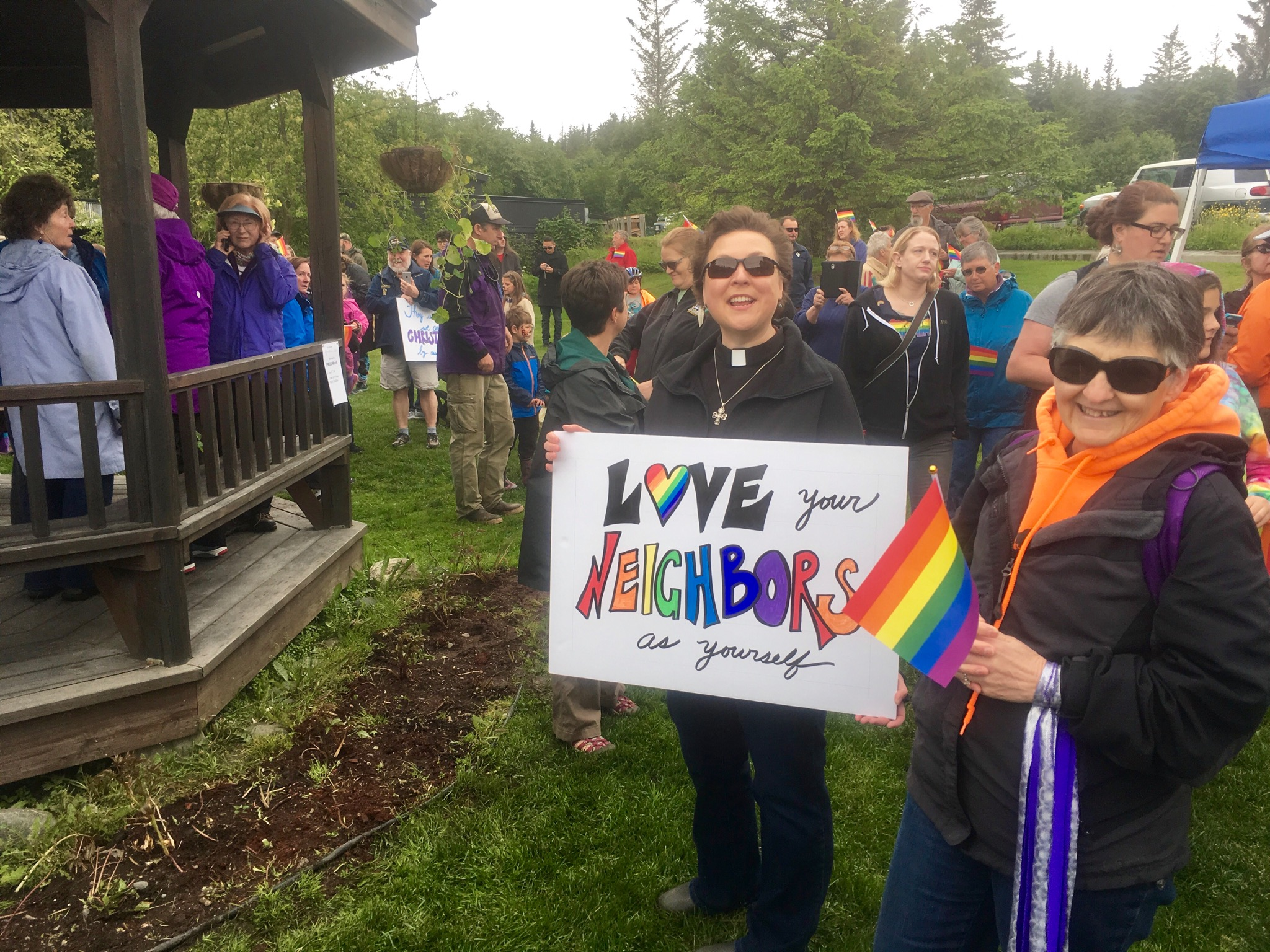
The first LGBT Pride parade in Homer, June 24, 2018

== Recognitions of same-sex relationships ==
Same-sex marriage has been legal in Alaska since October 12, 2014, via the district court ruling of Hamby v. Parnell.

=== Background ===
In 1996, the Alaska Legislature passed a bill banning same-sex marriage. Governor Tony Knowles declined to veto the bill, but allowed it to go become law without his signature on May 6, 1996. In 1998, the Legislature passed a constitutional amendment banning same-sex marriage, which was approved in a referendum on November 3, 1998.

=== Hamby v. Parnell ===
On May 12, 2014, five same-sex couples filed a lawsuit in federal district court in Anchorage challenging the state's constitutional same-sex marriage ban. District Court Judge Timothy Burgess scheduled oral argument for October 10.

On Sunday, October 12, 2014, less than a week after the U.S. Supreme Court declined to review similar cases from the Ninth Circuit Court Appeals, Latta v. Otter and Sevcik v. Sandoval, Judge Burgess ruled for the plaintiffs and declared Alaska's statutory and constitutional bans on same-sex marriage unconstitutional. Applications for marriage licenses were accepted from same-sex couples on October 13. The first couple to marry were Kristine Hilderbrand and Sarah Ellis, who obtained a waiver of the three-day waiting period for obtaining a license and married in Utqiagvik, on October 13.

== Adoption rights and parenting ==
Alaska permits adoption by married same-sex couples. In addition, lesbian couples have access to assisted reproduction services, such as in vitro fertilization. State law recognizes the non-genetic, non-gestational mother as a legal parent to a child born via donor insemination, but only if the parents are married.

There are no surrogacy laws in Alaska, but courts are generally favorable to the process, whether gestational or traditional. Same-sex couples are treated in the same manner as opposite-sex couples.

== Discrimination protections ==
=== State level ===
Map of Alaska boroughs, census areas, and cities that have sexual orientation and/or gender identity anti–employment discrimination ordinances Sexual orientation and gender identity with anti–employment discrimination ordinance Sexual orientation in city employment No anti-discrimination ordinance¹ ¹Since 2020, as a result of Bostock, discrimination on account of sexual orientation or gender identity in public and private employment is outlawed throughout the state. Discrimination against state employees based on their sexual orientation has been illegal since 2002.

Alaska law does not address discrimination on the basis of sexual orientation or gender identity in employment, housing, or public accommodations. An executive order, issued in 2002, prohibits discrimination based on sexual orientation in state employment. There is no provision for gender identity.

In 1975, the Alaska State Human Rights Commission took a formal stance that sexual orientation should be included in the state's non-discrimination law. In 1987, legislation to add sexual orientation was introduced, with support from Governor Steve Cowper and Attorney-General Grace Berg Schaible, but never made it out of committee. Similar legislation has been introduced numerous times over the years, but never brought to a vote. In 2015, Representative Andy Josephson filed a bill banning discrimination based on sexual orientation and gender identity. The bill had two co-sponsors, but died without a vote.

=== Local level ===
The municipalities of Anchorage, Juneau, Sitka and Ketchikan ban discrimination based on sexual orientation and gender identity in public and private employment, public accommodations, and housing. This represents about 46% of the state population.

In 2009, the Anchorage Assembly passed for the first time an ordinance to ban unfair discrimination against LGBTQ people in the city, by a vote of 7–4. Mayor Dan Sullivan vetoed the ordinance. A second attempt occurred in 2012, but voters rejected the proposal, known as Proposition 5, in April 2012 with 57% opposed. In September 2015, with support from Mayor Ethan Berkowitz, the Assembly again passed an ordinance to protect LGBTQ people from discrimination, by 9 votes to 2. On April 3, 2018, Anchorage voters rejected Proposition 1 by a margin of 53% to 47%, which if passed would have stripped protections from transgender individuals.

In July 2020, the Ketchikan City Council unanimously passed an ordinance to prohibit unfair discrimination on account of sexual orientation and gender identity in employment, housing and public accommodations, taking effect in mid-August.

Fairbanks prohibits discrimination on account of sexual orientation against city employees. In February 2019, the City Council passed an ordinance banning discrimination in employment, housing and public accommodations on the basis of sexual orientation and gender identity. Mayor Jim Matherly vetoed the ordinance a few days later, despite support from 80% of those who weighed in for several hours of public comments.

=== Bostock v. Clayton County ===
On June 15, 2020, the U.S. Supreme Court ruled in Bostock v. Clayton County, consolidated with Altitude Express, Inc. v. Zarda, and R.G. & G.R. Harris Funeral Homes Inc. v. Equal Employment Opportunity Commission that discrimination in the workplace on the basis of sexual orientation or gender identity is discrimination on the basis of sex, and Title VII therefore protects LGBT employees from discrimination.

== Hate crime law ==
Alaska state law does not address hate crimes based on gender identity or sexual orientation. However, since the Matthew Shepard and James Byrd, Jr. Hate Crimes Prevention Act was signed into law in October 2009 by President Barack Obama, U.S. federal law has provided penalty enhancements for crimes motivated by the victim's actual or perceived sexual orientation or gender identity. Hate crimes against LGBTQ people can be prosecuted in federal court.

== Transgender rights ==
Transgender persons in Alaska may request an amended birth certificate with a corrected name and gender marker. However, their previous legal name will still appear at the bottom of the amended birth certificate, along with language noting that their birth certificate was originally issued under their former name and amended due to a change of name. To request a change in the gender marker, the applicant must submit to the Department of Vital Records a "Birth Certificate Request Form", a photocopy of their ID or that of their parent or guardian, a letter from a medical or mental health provider attesting to appropriate clinical treatment for gender transition or a certified copy of a court ordered change of sex, and the payment of the fee. Changing the gender marker on a driver's license requires submitting to the Division of Motor Vehicles a letter from a licensed provider attesting clinical treatment or an already updated birth certificate or a court order for gender change.

=== Sports ===
In September 2023, the Alaska Board of Education, by a vote of 7-1, passed a rule to ban transgender individuals from participating in female sports and athletics throughout the state.

== Conversion therapy ==
In August 2020, Anchorage passed an ordinance by a vote of 9–2 to ban the use of conversion therapy on minors; the first city in Alaska to do so.

== Public opinion ==
A 2017 Public Religion Research Institute (PRRI) poll found that 57% of Alaska residents supported same-sex marriage, while 34% were opposed and 9% were undecided. Additionally, 65% supported an anti-discrimination law covering sexual orientation and gender identity. 27% were against. The PRRI also found that 52% were against allowing public businesses to refuse to serve LGBTQ people due to religious beliefs, while 44% supported allowing such religiously-based refusals.

A 2022 Public Religion Research Institute (PRRI) poll found that 70% of Alaska residents supported same-sex marriage, while 30% were opposed. The same poll found that 78% of Alaska residents supported an anti-discrimination law covering sexual orientation and gender identity. 23% were opposed.

Public opinion for LGBT anti-discrimination laws in Alaska
Poll source	Date(s) administered	Sample size	Margin of error	% support	% opposition	% no opinion
Public Religion Research Institute	January 2-December 30, 2019	268	?	59%	23%	18%
Public Religion Research Institute	January 3-December 30, 2018	277	?	68%	23%	9%
Public Religion Research Institute	April 5-December 23, 2017	287	?	65%	27%	8%
Public Religion Research Institute	April 29, 2015-January 7, 2016	710	?	73%	22%	5%

== Summary table ==
Same-sex sexual activity legal	Yes (Since 1980)	
Equal age of consent (16)	Yes	
Recognition of same-sex marriages	Yes (Since 2014)	
Stepchild adoption by same-sex couples	Yes (Since 2014)	
Joint adoption by same-sex couples	Yes (Since 2014)	
Lesbian, gay, and bisexual people allowed to serve openly in the military	Yes (Since 2011)	
Transgender people allowed to serve openly in the military	No (Since 2025)	
Intersex people are allowed to serve openly in the military	(Current DoD policy bans "hermaphrodites" from serving or enlisting in the military)	
Right to change legal gender	Yes	
Ban on conversion therapy for minors	No / Yes (In Anchorage)	
Equal access to IVF for lesbian couples	Yes	
Surrogacy arrangements legal for gay male couples	Yes	
MSMs allowed to donate blood	Yes (Since 2023, implemented on a FDA condition of being monogamous)	
	Sexual orientation	Gender identity or gender expression
Anti-discrimination laws in employment	Yes (Since 2020)	Yes (Since 2020)
Anti-discrimination laws in public accommodations	No / Yes (Varies by city)	No / Yes (Varies by city)
Anti-discrimination laws in housing	No / Yes (Varies by city)	No / Yes (Varies by city)
Anti-discrimination laws in credit and lending services	No / Yes (Varies by city)	No / Yes (Varies by city)
Hate crime law	Yes / No (Under federal law, but not covered under state law)	Yes / No (Under federal law, but not covered under state law)

== See also ==
- LGBT rights in the United States
