= 2014 Alaska Measure 2 =

Referendum to re-legalize cannabis

Measure 2
- An Act to tax and regulate the production, sale, and use of marijuana

Results
Choice	Votes	%
Yes	149,021	53.23%
No	130,924	46.77%
Valid votes	279,945	100.00%
Invalid or blank votes	0	0.00%
Total votes	279,945	100.00%
Results by state House district
Yes
60–70%
50–60%
No
50–60%

Alaska Measure 2 was a 2014 ballot measure passed by the U.S. state of Alaska, described as "An Act to tax and regulate the production, sale, and use of marijuana". The measure went into effect on February 24, 2015, allowing Alaskans age 21 and older to possess up to an ounce of cannabis and six plants, making Alaska the third state to legalize recreational marijuana, following Colorado and Washington. Oregon and Alaska both voted for legalization on Election Day 2014, but Alaska preceded Oregon in enactment.

The legal status of cannabis in Alaska had varied over the preceding 40 years. Alaska had recognized a right to cannabis with the 1975 Ravin v. State case in the Alaska Supreme Court. The state Legislature followed up by decriminalizing marijuana in 1982, but a 1990 ballot initiative also entitled Measure 2 recriminalized cannabis until its provisions were struck down in a 2003 Alaska Appeals court case, Noy v. State.

== Campaign ==
Local KTVA-TV newscaster Charlo Greene garnered national coverage, when on September 21 she abruptly quit her job on air, and announced her support for legalization. Greene had been reporting on the Alaska Cannabis Club during the evening's newscast, before revealing that she was the club's owner:

Now everything you've heard is why I, the actual owner of the Alaska Cannabis Club, will be dedicating all of my energy toward fighting for freedom and fairness, which begins with legalizing marijuana here in Alaska. And as for this job, well, not that I have a choice but, fuck it, I quit.

=== Opponents and proponents ===
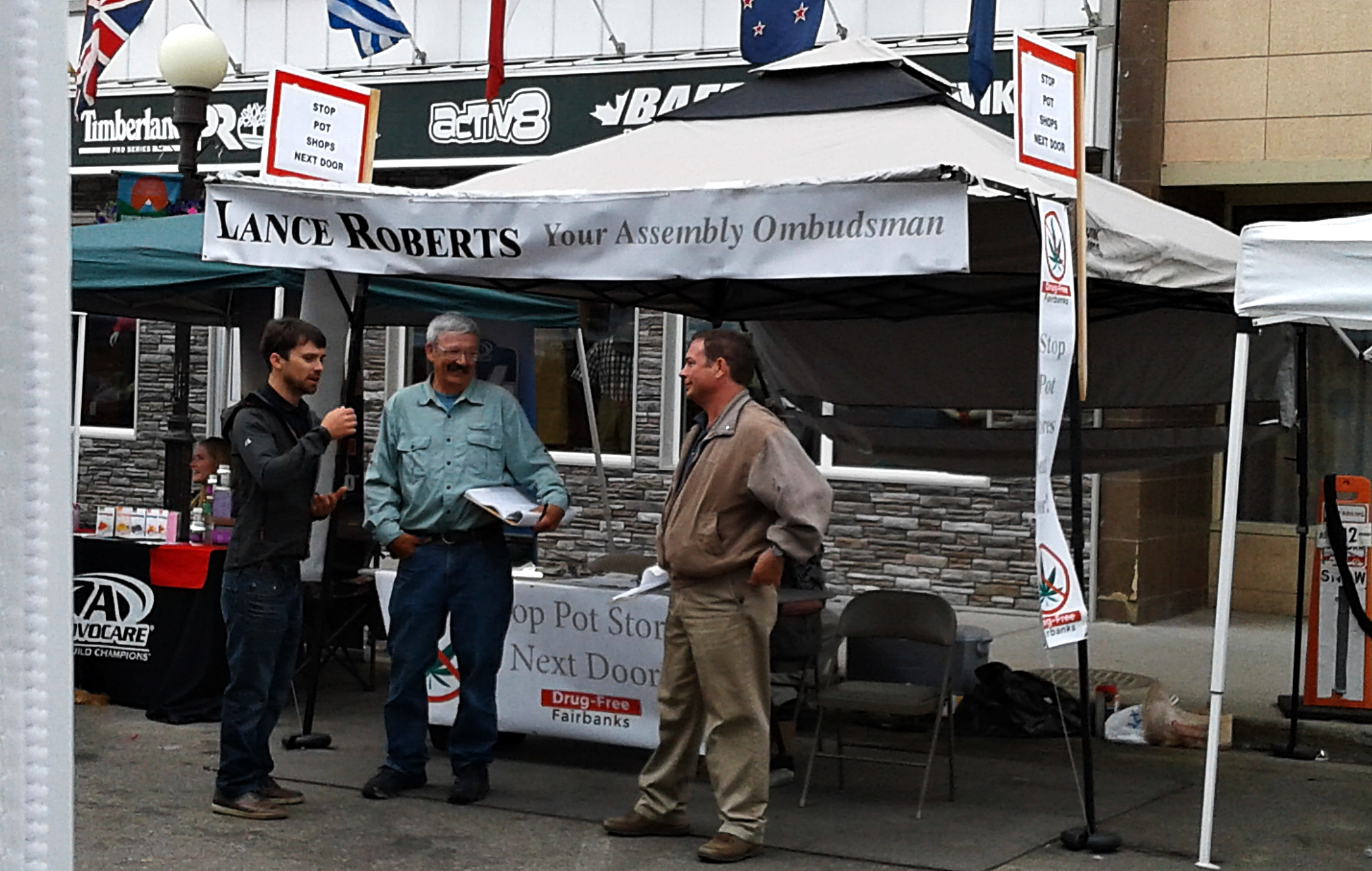
The passage of Measure 2 and subsequent legislation provided municipalities with significant leeway to enact local ordinances pertaining to commercial cannabis production and sales. Lance Roberts, a member of the Fairbanks North Star Borough Assembly, campaigns in downtown Fairbanks in June 2016 for an initiative to prohibit cannabis sales outside of the borough's two incorporated cities, using the slogan "Stop Pot Shops (Stores) Next Door".

The Alaska campaign was dominated by one large state group per side: the Campaign to Regulate Marijuana Like Alcohol in Alaska backing the initiative, and Big Marijuana. Big Mistake. Vote No on 2 comprising the main opposition. As of end-August 2014, the Campaign to Regulate had filed $700,000 in contributions with the Alaska Public Offices Commission, while No on 2 had filed $40,487. The Vote No on 2 group criticized the Campaign to Regulate for receiving the majority of its funds through the national Marijuana Policy Project; more than half of Vote No on 2's funding came from the Alaska Native village corporation Chenega Corp. By mid-October, the Campaign to Regulate had spent $827,000, against the Vote No's $69,000.

== Results ==
Measure 2
Choice	Votes	%
For	149,021	53.23
Against	130,924	46.77
Total	279,945	100.00

Source: Alaska Division of Elections

== Implementation ==
Possession and usage by adults was legalized on February 24, 2015. Alaska House Bill 123, the Marijuana Control Board bill which established a five-member Marijuana Control Board that shares staff with the Alcoholic Beverage Control Board, passed the House on April 19 by a vote of 37–1. The first legal marijuana store opened in Valdez in October 2016. Other retail outlets have since opened in most of Alaska's larger cities.
