= 1998 Alaska Measure 2 =

Referendum to ban same-sex marriage

Measure 2
- This measure would amend the Declaration of Rights section of the Alaska Constitution to limit marriage. The amendment would say that to be valid, a marriage may exist only between one man and one woman. SHOULD THIS AMENDMENT BE ADOPTED?

Results
Choice	Votes	%
Yes	152,965	68.11%
No	71,631	31.89%
Valid votes	224,596	98.87%
Invalid or blank votes	2,560	1.13%
Total votes	227,156	100.00%
Registered voters/turnout	453,332	49.54%
Yes
70–80%
60–70%
50–60%
No
50–60%

Ballot Measure 2 of 1998 is a ballot measure, since ruled unconstitutional, that added an amendment to the Alaska Constitution that prohibited the recognition of same-sex marriage in Alaska. The Ballot measure was sparked by the lawsuit filed by Jay Brause and Gene Dugan, after the two men were denied a marriage license by the Alaska Bureau of Vital Statistics. In Brause v. Bureau of Vital Statistics, 1998 WL 88743, the Alaska Superior Court ruled that the state needed compelling reason to deny marriage licenses to same-sex couples and ordered a trial on the question. In response, the Alaska Legislature immediately proposed and passed Resolution 42, which became what is now known as Ballot Measure 2. Ballot Measure 2 passed via public referendum on November 3, 1998, with 68% of voters supporting and 32% opposing. The Bause case was dismissed following the passage of the ballot measure.

The text of the adopted amendment, which is found at Article I, section 25 of the Alaska Constitution, states:

To be valid or recognized in this State, a marriage may exist only between one man and one woman.

On October 12, 2014, U.S. federal Judge Timothy Burgess struck down the ban as a violation of the U.S. constitutional guarantee of due process and equal protection. Burgess wrote, "Alaska’s denial of the benefits and dignity of marriage for them only perpetuates this discrimination without legitimate grounds.” Burgess also barred Alaska from refusing to acknowledge lawful same-sex marriages conducted in other states.

Article I, § 25. of the Alaskan Constitution remains an unconstitutional constitutional amendment to this day. It can repealed by either a state constitutional convention or by a legislatively referred constitutional amendment that requires a two-thirds vote in both the Alaskan State Senate and the Alaskan House of Representatives and a majority vote in a referendum.

== Background ==
In 1995 two men, Jay Brause and Gene Dugan, relying on the then-gender-neutral marriage code of Alaska submitted an application for a marriage license to the Alaska Bureau of Vital Statistics, Third Judicial District at Anchorage, which was denied despite satisfying all of the requirements of the state with the exception of being of the same gender. In the wake of the Hawaii Supreme Court's decision in Baehr v. Lewin, in which the Hawaii Supreme Court held that the State's marriage statute constituted sex discrimination under the Hawaii Constitution but was later overturned, the two men sued the State of Alaska. They sought to have the marriage statute denying same-sex marriage declared unconstitutional, and seeking an injunction that would permanently prevent the State from applying or enforcing the statutes denying same-sex marriages. Before the initial hearing was held, the Alaska Legislature made an amendment to the marriage statute to discard the gender-neutral language and restrict marriage to only one man and one woman. Brause and Dugan responded by amending their complaint to ask for a court declaration that this statute was also unconstitutional, arguing that by failing to issue them a marriage license the State had denied them due process and infringed their right to privacy under Alaska's Constitution.

Superior Judge Peter Michalski issued his memorandum and order on February 27, 1998, which stated: "The court finds that marriage, i.e., the recognition of one's choice of a life partner, is a fundamental right. The state must therefore have a compelling interest that supports its decision to refuse to recognize the exercise of this fundamental right by those who choose same-sex partners rather than opposite-sex partners." Granting the plaintiffs' motion and denying the State's, Judge Michalski concluded that there must be "further hearings to determine whether a compelling state interest can be shown for the ban on same-sex marriage found in the Alaska Marriage Code." Immediately after the ruling, the State filed a petition to the Alaska Supreme Court to review the decision, asserting that the lower court's decision had constituted judicial legislation, wrongly construed the Alaska Constitution as providing a right to same-sex marriage contrary to the history and intent of the constitution, and erroneously held that the marriage law constituted sex discrimination. The Alaska Supreme Court refused to consider the State's appeal in the Brause case, allowing litigation to continue.

== State constitutional amendment ==
=== Popular debate ===
During the legislative process, the main group supporting the amendment was the Alaska Family Coalition (AFC), which was formed in June 1998 and included many civic leaders, businessmen, attorneys, a former Mayor of Anchorage, and a former Governor's Chief-of-Staff. The main argument brought forth by the AFC was that the amendment was necessary to counter the radical redefinition of marriage established by the Brause decision. Another main proponent of the amendment was the Catholic Bishops of Alaska, which argued that the Marriage Amendment classifies the traditional view of marriage and expresses the true importance of marriage to society. The main group opposing the amendment was Alaskans for Civil Rights/No On Two Campaign (ACR), which claimed official support from the Alaska Democratic Party, the League of Women Voters, the Alaska Civil Liberties Union, People for the American Way, and Parents and Friends of Lesbians and Gays. The ACR framed the amendment as an attack on the right to privacy and warned that it may lead advocates to attack other groups later. Polls in April 1998 revealed mixed views with some claiming as many as two-thirds of Alaskans supported a constitutional ban on same-sex marriage, while another claimed only half of Alaskans favored a ban. As the debate progressed, the issues shifted from homosexuality to the privacy and civil rights along with self-government and the reaffirmation of the meaning of marriage. Although many had anticipated an ugly campaign, it was widely viewed as spirited rather than contentious.

=== Legislative passage ===
After the Superior Court ruling, with the State legislature already in session, the Senate Majority Leader Robin L. Taylor reacted stating:

It is apparent that our Judiciary needs further clarification on fundamental values. Marriage has been the foundation of civilization for thousands of years and in cultures around the world. Marriage is the most important social institution in our society. The state has a... principle interest in preserving and protecting the special status of marriage, regardless of religious beliefs.

In February 1998, just days after Michalski's ruling, the Alaska Senate Health, Education and Social Services Committee introduced Joint Resolution 42, which stated that "each marriage contract in Alaska may be entered into only by one man and one woman. The legislature may, by law, enact additional requirements relating to marriage." The Twentieth Alaska Legislature passed the Constitutional amendment with a vote of 28 yeas to 12 nays in the House and 14 yeas to 6 nays in the Senate. After passage by the legislature, the amendment was set to be voted on by the citizenry of Alaska for ratification in the November 1998 election as ballot "Measure 2."

=== Ballot Measure 2 ===
On November 3, 1998, the citizens of Alaska voted on ballot Measure 2, introduced by language that indicated the measure "would amend the Declaration of Rights section of the Alaska Constitution to limit marriage." The majority of the funding in support of the amendment, $500,000, came from the Church of Jesus Christ of Latter-day Saints in Utah, with another $25,000 contributed by Gary Bauer's organization, Campaign for Working Families, in Washington, D.C. The constitutional amendment determined that a valid marriage could exist only between one man and one woman." The statement of support was written by Senator Loren Leman, the primary sponsor of Resolution 42, and indicated that the "debate is about who should define marriage: the people, or a handful of non-elected judges." In the statement of opposition, the League of Women Voters of Alaska argued that voters should vote "no" to eliminate limits on citizens' individual liberties and rights and to preserve the checks and balances of the three branches of government of Alaska. The results of the referendum revealed that with 68% of the votes, Measure 2 had been approved. After the passing of the amendment, Article I, section 25 of the Alaska Constitution was amended to read as follows:

Marriage. To be valid or recognized in this State, a marriage may exist only between one man and one woman.

Subsequently, in light of the amendment, the Alaska Superior Court dismissed the Brause lawsuit and rendered the previous rulings moot.

== Federal question ==
Although the arguments in Brause for full legal recognition of same-sex marriage were effectively mooted by the constitutional amendment, the plaintiffs alternatively argued that principles of equality demanded that same-sex couples be accorded the rights and benefits of marriage, even if marital status itself were to describe only different-sex couples. However, the Alaska Supreme Court dismissed the case on procedural grounds, determining that the plaintiffs had failed to present an actual controversy.

In October 2014, in the case of Hamby v. Parnell, U.S. District Court Judge Timothy Burgess found Alaska's constitutional amendment limiting marriage to one man and one woman unconstitutional. The U.S. Supreme Court ultimately denied review of the case, allowing marriages to proceed pending further guidance from the 9th Circuit. The state was also denied a larger, 11-judge en banc review of the case.Governor Bill Walker's attorney general, Craig Richards, asked the 9th Circuit Court of Appeals to put the matter on hold in January 2015, pending the Supreme Court decision on the matter.

== See also ==
- Same-sex marriage in the United States
- Same-sex marriage in Alaska
- Defense of Marriage Act
- LGBTQ rights in Alaska
- Alaska Civil Liberties Union v. Alaska, an Alaska Supreme Court case holding that the ballot initiative did not foreclose state equal protection claims brought on behalf of same-sex couples.
