= 1990 Alaska Measure 2 =

Referendum to criminalize marijuana

Alaska Measure 2 or the Alaska Marijuana Criminalization Initiative was a 1990 ballot measure passed by the U.S. state of Alaska. The initiative stated that it: "would change Alaska's laws by making all such possession of marijuana criminal, with possible penalties of up to 90 days in jail and/or up to a $1000 fine."

The legal status of cannabis in Alaska changed twice after the passage in 1972 of a constitutional amendment affirming an individual's right to privacy. The state specifically recognized privacy with respect to possession and use of cannabis with the 1975 Ravin v. State case in the Alaska Supreme Court. The state legislature followed up by decriminalizing marijuana in 1982.

- Measure 2's re-criminalization of marijuana in 1990 met with court challenges over the years.
- 1990 Measure 2 was struck down in 2003 by the Alaska Court of Appeals in Noy v. State. Agreeing with the 2003 case result, Alaska voters re-legalized marijuana with a different Measure 2 in 2014.

== Results ==
Measure 2
Choice	Votes	%
For	105,263	54.29
Against	88,644	45.71
Total	193,907	100.00

== Campaign ==
The leader of the initiative campaign Alaskans for the Recriminalization of Marijuana was Marie Majewske, described as an "Anchorage grandmother". The initiative also received support from William Bennett, President Bush's Drug Czar, who planned to visit Alaska to campaign for the measure; the DEA and FBI also sponsored a Marijuana Myths and Misconceptions symposium in Anchorage.

Opposition to the initiative was led by Alaskans for Privacy, and the National Organization for the Reform of Marijuana Laws (NORML) gave top priority to defeating the initiative, contributing "nearly $16,000" to opposition efforts by late September.

Polling across Alaska in August of that year showed a nearly 2–1 margin of support for the measure. Gubernatorial candidates Arliss Sturgulewski (Republican) and Walter Hickel (Alaskan Independence Party) supported the initiative, while Democrat Tony Knowles supported criminalization but not incarceration for first-time offenders.

At the successful end of the campaign, Majewske announced:

It's wonderful, I have great faith in the people of this state. I truly believed they would do the right thing. I think that this will say to people that the law didn't work, and we need to be looking in the other direction, toward a drug-free environment for our children. The only way to do that is to tell them it's illegal.
