= Ravin v. State =

Alaska Supreme Court decision

- Court: Alaska Supreme Court
- Decided: May 28, 1975
- Citation: 537 P.2d 494

Court membership
- Judges sitting: Jay Andrew Rabinowitz, Roger George Connor, Robert Cecil Erwin, Robert Boochever, James Martin Fitzgerald

Case opinions
- Decision by: Rabinowitz
- Concurrence: Boochever, Connor

Ravin v. State, 537 P.2d 494 (Ak. 1975), was a unanimous decision by the Alaska Supreme Court. Decided on May 27, 1975, the Court held that the Alaska Constitution's right to privacy protects an adult's ability to use and possess a small amount of marijuana in the home for personal use. The Alaska Supreme Court thereby became the first—and only—state or federal court to announce a constitutional privacy right that protects some level of marijuana use and possession.

== History ==
It was brought about by Irwin Ravin, an attorney who caused his own arrest in Anchorage for refusing to sign a traffic ticket while in possession of marijuana in order to challenge the existing law. Ravin felt that the case was more about privacy, saying

Marijuana has never been an issue for me. The fight was always for privacy, our territory and now state has traditionally been the home of people who prize their individuality and who have chosen to achieve a measure of control over their own lifestyles which is now virtually unattainable in many of our sister states.

The court ruled:

... we conclude that no adequate justification for the state's intrusion into the citizen's right to privacy by its prohibition of possession of marijuana by an adult for personal consumption in the home has been shown. The privacy of the individual's home cannot be breached absent a persuasive showing of a close and substantial relationship of the intrusion to a legitimate governmental interest. Here, mere scientific doubts will not suffice. The state must demonstrate a need based on proof that the public health or welfare will in fact suffer if the controls are not applied.

== Subsequent law ==
Alaskan voters approved a ballot initiative recriminalizing marijuana possession in 1990, but in Noy v. State, the Alaska Court of Appeals held that ballot initiatives are subject to the same constitutional limitations as legislative enactments, and thus the portion of the amended statutes criminalizing possession of less than four ounces of marijuana in the home was unconstitutional. In June 2006, the Alaska Legislature amended the law to prohibit the possession of more than one ounce of marijuana and to make possession of more than one ounce of marijuana a class A misdemeanor. In July 2006, Juneau Superior Court Judge Patricia Collins struck down the law, ruling it unconstitutional. In April 2009, in a 3-2 ruling, the Supreme Court of Alaska vacated the lower court's ruling, finding that the plaintiffs lacked standing to sue in the first place.

In November 2014, Alaskan voters approved a ballot measure to legalize the possession and sale of marijuana, regulating it in a manner similar to alcohol sales.
