= Alaska Court of Appeals =

Alaska intermediate appellate court

The Alaska Court of Appeals is an intermediate court of appeals for criminal cases in the State of Alaska's judicial department (Alaska Court System), created in 1980 by the Alaska Legislature as an additional appellate court to lessen the burden on the Alaska Supreme Court. The court of appeals consists of a chief judge and three associate judges, who are all appointed by the governor of Alaska (see List of governors of Alaska) and face judicial retention elections every eight years; the chief judge of the court of appeals is selected from among the four by the chief justice of the supreme court to serve a two-year term.

The court of appeals hears oral argument from lower state trial courts on a regular basis in Anchorage.

== Appointment and composition ==
All Alaska state court judges are selected in accordance with the Missouri Plan. The governor of Alaska appoints a court of appeals judge from a list of qualified candidates submitted by the Alaska Judicial Council. To be eligible for appointment, a person must be a citizen of the United States and a resident of Alaska for five years prior to appointment. A court of appeals judge must be licensed to practice law in Alaska at the time of appointment and must have engaged in the active practice of law for eight years. The appointed judge must be approved by the voters on a nonpartisan ballot at the first statewide general election held more than three years after appointment; thereafter, each court of appeals judge must participate in another retention election every eight years.

=== Current judges ===
The members of Alaskan Court of Appeals, by order of seniority, include:

Name	Start	Term Ends	Appointer	Law School
Marjorie Allard, Chief Judge	November 23, 2012	2032	Sean Parnell (R)	Yale
Tracey Wollenberg	February 9, 2017	2028	Bill Walker (I)	Columbia
Timothy Terrell	December 18, 2020	2032	Mike Dunleavy (R)	Oregon
RuthAnne Beach	February 4, 2026	2030	Mike Dunleavy (R)	Thomas Jefferson

== Jurisdiction ==
The court of appeals has jurisdiction to hear appeals from judgments in criminal cases and certain other quasi-criminal cases in which a minor is accused of committing a crime (juvenile delinquency cases), cases in which prisoners are challenging the legality of their confinement (habeas corpus and post-conviction relief matters), and cases involving probation and parole decisions. Also, a defendant in a criminal case who appeals from district court to superior court can ask the court of appeals to review the resulting decision of the superior court, but the court of appeals may, in its discretion, refuse to hear the appeal.

The court of appeals' jurisdiction is therefore over criminal and quasi-criminal matters rather than civil matters; it was created in 1980 to take the burden of these matters from the supreme court, which is therefore able to concentrate on civil matters. However, unlike the Supreme Court of the United States, the Alaska Supreme Court is required to hear appeals in civil cases in the first (and usually last) instance and is not able to exercise its discretion whether to consider appeals previously heard by other appellate courts. Although granting both civil and criminal jurisdiction to the new court of appeals (freeing the supreme court to be purely an appellate court of last resort rather than first instance) had been considered by some proponents in 1980, it was not then believed that the Alaska legislature would be amenable to creating such a court.

== Decisions ==
The court of appeals usually announces its decisions of cases by issuing memorandum opinions and judgments (MO&Js) and orders summarily ruling on the merits of cases or dismissing them, as well as opinions for official publication (in Westlaw, the Pacific Reporter and the Alaska Reporter). Although the MO&Js and most orders are not published, the MO&Js are available for public inspection at the Anchorage, Fairbanks, and Juneau offices of the clerk of the appellate courts, and the orders are filed in the clerk's Anchorage office. Current MO&Js are also available on the Alaska Court System website. Nevertheless, MO&Js are binding only upon the parties and stare decisis does not apply.

== See also ==
- Judiciary of Alaska
