= Constitution of Alaska =

American state constitution

Constitution of the State of Alaska
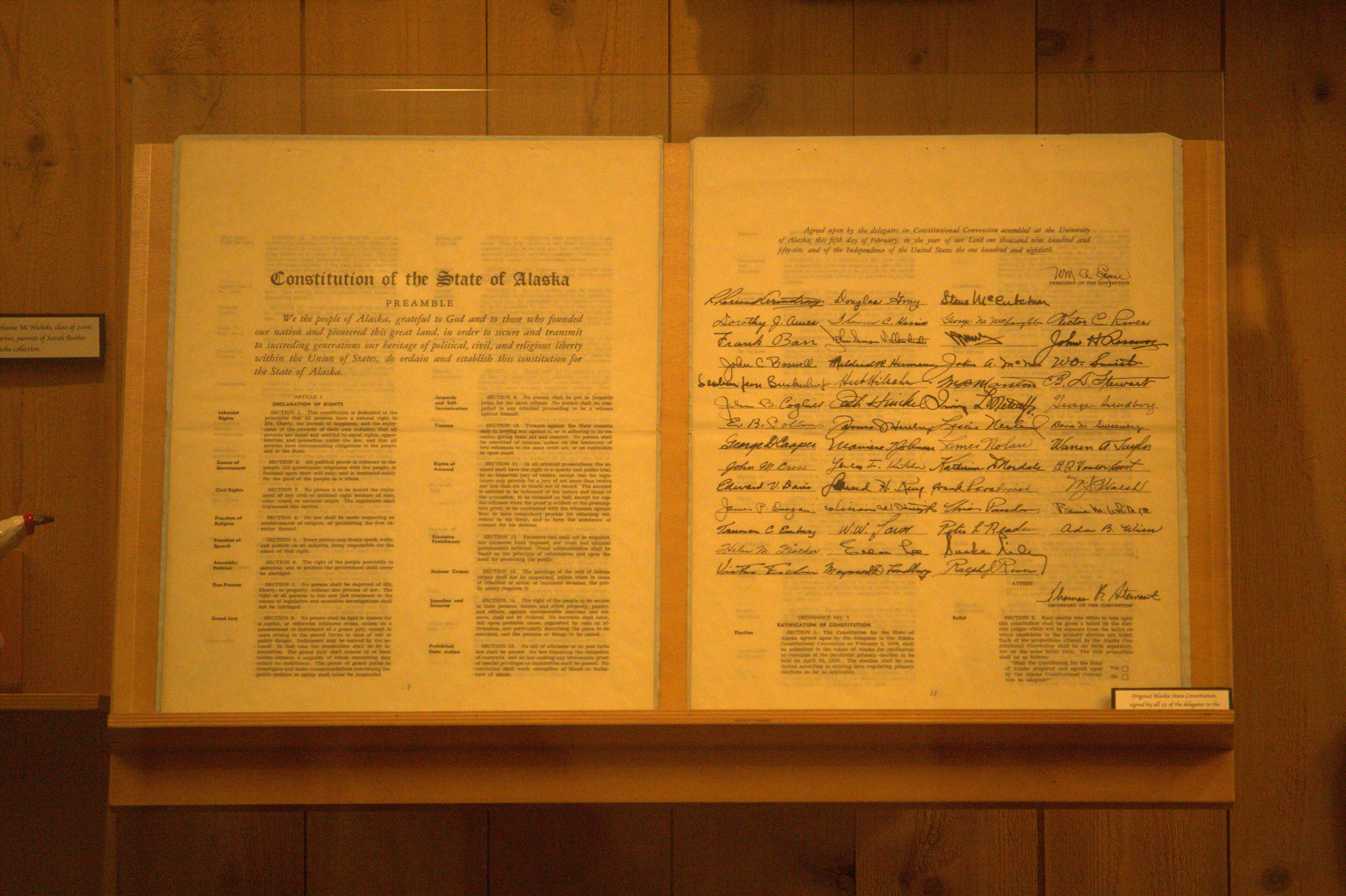

Overview
- Jurisdiction: Alaska, United States
- Ratified: April 24, 1956; 70 years ago
- Date effective: January 3, 1959; 67 years ago

History
- Amendments: 28
- Signatories: 55

The Constitution of the State of Alaska was ratified on April 4, 1956, and took effect with Alaska's admission to the United States as a U.S. state on January 3, 1959.

== History and background ==
=== The statehood movement ===
In the 1940s, the movement for Alaska statehood was gaining momentum within the territory, but stymied by opposition from Lower 48 commercial interests and some members of Congress. Many statehood proponents felt that a well-written constitution would help advance the cause in Washington, D.C.

As a result, one of the duties the Alaska Territorial Legislature laid upon the Alaska Statehood Committee, established in 1949, was to "assemble applicable material, make studies and provide recommendations in a timely manner" preparatory to drafting a constitution.

=== Constitutional convention ===
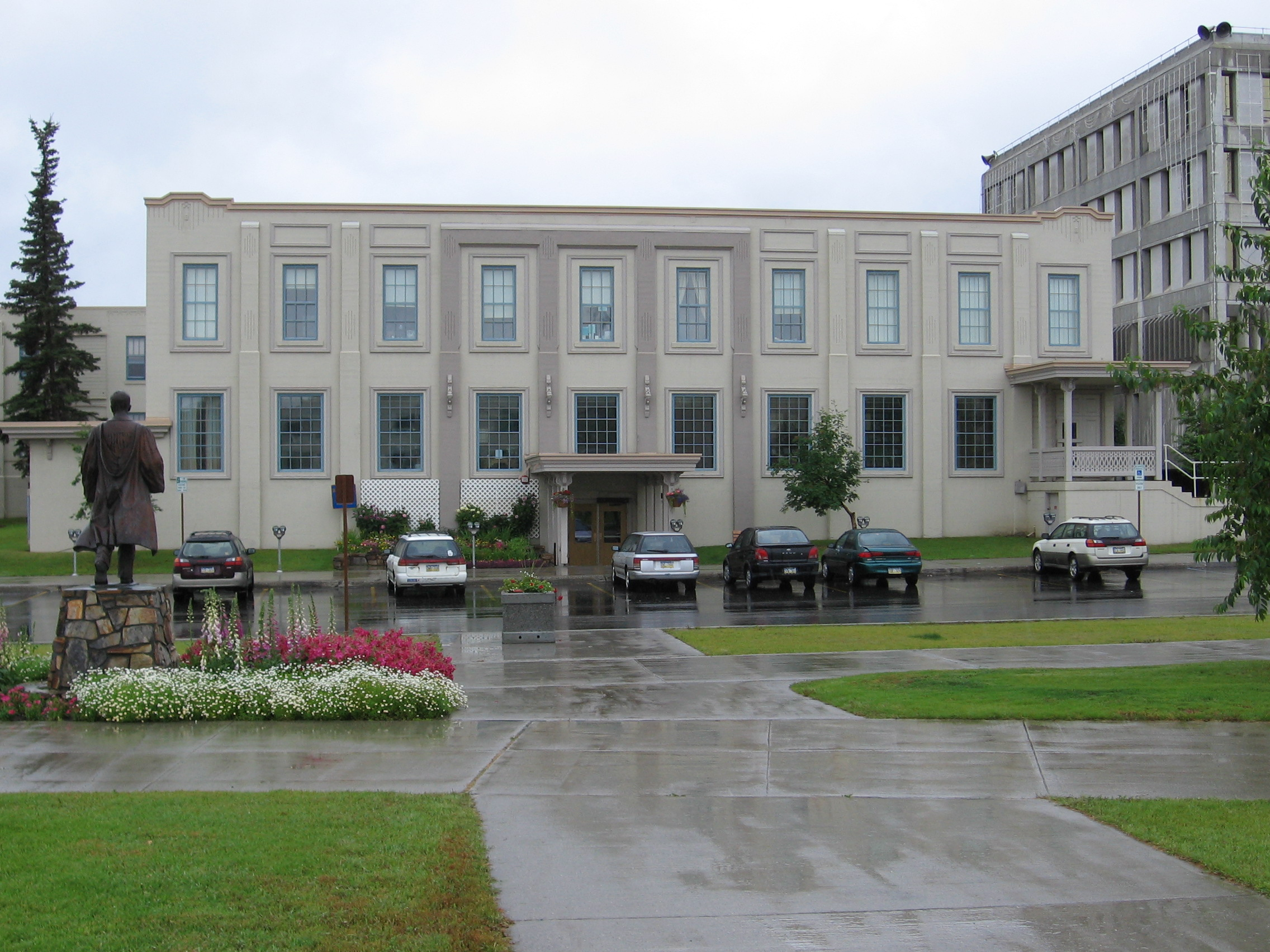
The UA gymnasium/library where the constitution was signed on February 6, 1956, currently known as Signers' Hall.

On November 8, 1955, 55 elected delegates from across Alaska (a number chosen to echo the 55 in attendance at the Philadelphia Convention of 1787) met at the brand new student union building at the University of Alaska. The building, quickly christened Constitution Hall by the Board of Regents, was temporarily handed over to the delegates who assembled to create the new document at a constitutional convention. Fairbanks (technically, in this instance, College) was selected as the site instead of Juneau, the territorial capital, to escape the influence of lobbyists and to benefit from the academic setting. The latter consideration was largely influenced by New Jersey's choice of Rutgers University for its 1947 convention.

The convention was led by then-territorial Senator William A. Egan, who became the state's first governor. The other delegates, 49 men and six women, included territorial legislators Ralph J. Rivers, who became U.S. Representative from Alaska at-large, and Jack Coghill, who became lieutenant governor. Frank Peratrovich, the mayor of Klawock who was also a territorial legislator, was the only Alaska Native among the delegates. The oldest delegate, Earnest B. Collins, was speaker of the 1st territorial House in 1913. Collins lived in Alaska longer than any delegate except for Peratrovich, having arrived in 1904. The youngest delegate, Thomas C. Harris, had only lived in Alaska for around five years and had been elected by some 150 votes cast in and around the Valdez area. Other delegates who were notable outside of law and politics include: Fairbanks bush pilot Frank Barr; mining engineer and Fairbanks Exploration Company executive John C. Boswell; Swiss emigrant and Kachemak Bay homesteader Yule F. Kilcher; World War II era military officer Marvin R. "Muktuk" Marston; Steve McCutcheon, a photographer whose collection represents a significant documentation of mid-20th century life in Alaska; Leslie Nerland, who took his father's department store in Fairbanks and turned it into a statewide empire, even extending to Hawaii at one point; Barrie M. White, an Anchorage entrepreneur and real estate developer, and Ada Wien, from a pioneer Alaskan and pioneer aviation family.

The constitutional convention was in session for 75 days. The constitution was adopted by the delegates on February 5, 1956. The signing of the constitution the following day attracted nearly 1,000 spectators, so the event was moved to the university's gymnasium and library building. This building was renamed Signers' Hall in the late 1980s, and presently houses the administration of the current-day University of Alaska Fairbanks campus. One delegate, R. E. Robertson, was absent, having resigned his position in protest of the finished document and returned to Juneau. The constitution was ratified by territorial voters on April 24, 1956, and became effective when the Alaska Statehood Proclamation was signed on January 3, 1959.

=== Principles ===
The delegates drew on several sources for inspiration: the National Municipal League's "Model State Constitution" as well as the recently adopted constitutions of Missouri, New Jersey, and Hawaii, and studies by consultants and constitutional law scholars.

One of the aims of the delegates was to produce a short, general document, on the model of the United States Constitution. Rather than specify most aspects in minute detail, as did many state constitutions, the delegates chose instead to leave broad authority to future state legislatures. The resulting document is thus only half the average state constitution length of 26,000 words. Much of the language in the new constitution was a reaction against weak territorial institutions (thus the strong legislature and executive provided for in Articles II and III). At the same time, a state constitutional reform movement was growing in the United States, and ideas such as the "broad strokes" approach and the unified judiciary of Article IV incorporated leading constitutional thought.

== Articles ==
=== Preamble ===
We the people of Alaska, grateful to God and to those who founded our nation and pioneered this great land, in order to secure and transmit to succeeding generations our heritage of political, civil, and religious liberty within the Union of States, do ordain and establish this constitution for the State of Alaska.

=== Article I: Declaration of Rights ===
The constitution begins by establishing the basic rights of Alaska's citizens. Much of Article I essentially reiterates the United States Bill of Rights, but includes several original provisions. Section 3 bans discrimination based on "race, color, creed, sex, or national origin". Section 7, which largely mirrors the Due Process protections under Section 1 of the Fourteenth Amendment, extends protection to "persons to fair and just treatment in the course of legislative and executive investigations", a reaction against McCarthyism. Section 22 establishes the right to privacy; the Alaska Supreme Court has interpreted this to protect, among other things, home possession of small amounts of marijuana (see Ravin v. State, 537 P.2d 494 (Alaska Supreme Court 1975).).

=== Article II: The Legislature ===
Article II establishes a bicameral Alaska Legislature, composed of 20 senators elected for four years and 40 representatives elected for two. Many delegates favored a unicameral legislature; this failed but is reflected in the large number of purposes for which joint sessions are required. The delegates trusted the legislature to act responsibly, so the constitution does not contain the detailed limits on the legislature often found in other states.

=== Article III: The Executive ===
Territorial executives were weak, with federal bureaucracy exerting weight from above and elected territorial legislatures limiting the authority of the Presidentially-appointed governor with a variety of special commissions. The delegates desired a strong, streamlined executive, and wrote Article III to give the governor more power than most other state executives.

Article III vests executive power in a governor elected for four years. The governor and lieutenant governor are elected on a single ticket, and are the only statewide elected officials.

The governor of Alaska has a large amount of patronage. The governor appoints the heads of all executive departments (most states provide for some to be elected), who are required in general to be people, not multi-member boards.

=== Article IV: The Judiciary ===
Article IV creates the Alaska Court System. While in many states judicial authority is fragmented among several levels of jurisdiction with many special courts, the delegates designed the Alaska judiciary to be a single, unified system. The constitution specifies the Alaska Supreme Court, the Alaska Superior Court, and leaves other courts to be "established by the legislature" as needed. Article IV provides for Missouri Plan selection of judges.

=== Article V: Voting and Elections ===
Article V's provisions are mostly standard, setting such things as voting age and election dates. It guarantees both the secret ballot and provides for judicial review of contested election results. A requirement that voters must be able to "read or speak the English language" was removed by amendment in 1970 after the passage of the Voting Rights Act of 1965.

=== Article VI: Legislative Apportionment ===
Article VI sets procedures for decennial reapportionment. This is carried out by an appointed board, rather than the legislature as in most states; prior to 1998 amendments, the governor held this authority.

=== Article VII: Health, Education, and Welfare ===
Article VII is the shortest in the constitution, mandating a "system of public schools open to all children of the State [...] free from sectarian control", establishing the University of Alaska as the state university, and directing the legislature to "provide for the promotion and protection of public health" and "provide for public welfare".

=== Article VIII: Natural Resources ===
Article VIII is the first article dealing solely and broadly with resources to appear in a state constitution. The delegates wished to curtail what was seen as abuse of Alaska's resources (see Ordinance No. 3) and ensure reasonable development to broaden Alaska's economic base. The chief principle was that resources should be managed as a public trust, providing "for maximum use consistent with the public interest", further defined as "utilization, development, and conservation ... for the maximum benefit of [the] people"; for common access to resources; and for development to be based on sustainable yield. Article VIII also provides for state parks and protected areas, and for the leasing of state lands for resource development.

=== Article IX: Finance and Taxation ===
Article IX deals with budgeting, appropriations, tax exemptions, public debt, and bans "earmarking". Later amendments established the Alaska Permanent Fund and budget reserves.

=== Article X: Local Government ===
Article X provides for Alaska's unique borough system. Local government in the territory was undeveloped, due to its sparse population and the Organic Act of 1912 which banned the creation of counties. The delegates wished to avoid the pitfalls of the traditional county system, such as overlapping jurisdictions and service districts, and tightly constrained local bodies, so they created an entirely new system. The aim, as stated in Section 1, was "to provide for maximum local self-government with a minimum of local government units, and to prevent duplication of tax-levying jurisdictions." Thus Article X states that the only local government units are cities and boroughs (both organized and unorganized), and only organized boroughs and cities may levy taxes.

=== Article XI: The Initiative, Referendum, and Recall ===
Article XI sets out procedures for the use of initiatives to "propose and enact laws", referendums to "approve and reject acts of the legislature", and elections to recall public officials. It also restricts the initiative and referendum from being used in certain areas, such as appropriations or to enact special legislation.

=== Article XII: General Provisions ===
Article XII is a miscellaneous article, containing definitions of terms, setting the state boundaries, and prescribing the oath of office and merit system, among other things.

=== Article XIII: Amendment and Revision ===
Article XIII sets procedures for constitutional amendment. Amendments can originate either with the legislature or at a constitutional convention, and are voted on at the next general election. Constitutional conventions can be called by the Legislature at any time; additionally, every ten years a referendum must be taken on whether to hold a convention. All four such referendums held to date have failed.

=== Article XIV: Apportionment Schedule ===
Article XIV set up the initial apportionment of the legislature, to be used prior to the first post-statehood census, and is now obsolete.

=== Article XV: Schedule of Transitional Measures ===
Article XV dealt with eventual Alaska statehood, focusing on legal continuity and establishment of the new state government. Since it is no longer a working part of the constitution, Alaska courts have ruled that it can be modified by statute or initiative. This has allowed, for instance, the various initiatives to move the state capital, as Juneau's capital status is defined in Section 20.

== Ordinances ==
The referendum on constitutional ratification contained three ballot measures to be voted upon, as provided in Article XV, Section 24.

Ordinance No. 1 was the ratifying proposition itself: Shall the Constitution for the State of Alaska prepared and agreed upon by the Alaska Constitutional Convention be adopted? Ordinance No. 1 passed 17,447 – 8,180.

Ordinance No. 2 provided for the adoption of the "Alaska-Tennessee Plan", which provided that two U.S. Senators and a Representative should be elected to serve as a "shadow" delegation until statehood. Ordinance No. 2 passed 15,011 – 9,556.

Ordinance No. 3 outlawed the use of fish traps in commercial salmon fishing. This issue had special significance in territorial Alaska. Fish traps, usually operated by Outside-owned canneries and widely blamed for the near-collapse of the salmon fishery, were seen as a symbol of exploitation of Alaska by absentee commercial interests. Former territorial Governor Ernest Gruening alluded to the issue in his keynote address to the convention:

The people of Alaska have repeatedly and unchangingly manifested their overwhelming opposition to fish traps. [...] But fish trap beneficiaries, residents of the mother country, want to retain their Alaska traps. So the traps are retained. And it is the power and authority of the federal government which retains them. In a clear-cut issue between the few, profiting, non-colonial Americans and the many, seriously damaged, colonial Alaskans, the state-side interest wins hands down.

Ordinance No. 3 passed by 21,285 – 4,004.

== Amendments ==
As of 2006 there had been 28 amendments to the Alaska Constitution, as well as 12 which were rejected by voters. This is substantially fewer than in most state constitutions (which average 115 amendments), due both to the short period the constitution has been in force and to its generalized construction. Amendments which passed include Article I's right-to-privacy clause and ban on sexual discrimination (1972), an amendment authorizing the Alaska Permanent Fund (1976), and an amendment banning same-sex marriage (1998) (this was later declared unconstitutional in Obergefell v. Hodges).

== See also ==
- Impeachment in Alaska

== Sources ==
- McBeath, Gerald A. (1997). The Alaska State Constitution: A Reference Guide. Westport, Conn.: Greenwood Press. ISBN 978-0-313-27778-8.
