= 11th Alaska State Legislature =

Term of state legislature in Alaska, US

The Eleventh Alaska State Legislature served from January 1979 to January 1981.

== Senate ==
District	Name	Party	Location
O	Don Bennett	Republican	Fairbanks
F	W. E. "Brad" Bradley	Republican	Anchorage
I	Mike Colletta	Republican	Anchorage
J	Ed Dankworth	Republican	Anchorage
O	Bettye Fahrenkamp	Democratic	Fairbanks
P	Frank R. Ferguson	Democratic	Kotzebue
O	W. Glenn Hackney	Republican	Fairbanks
M	George H. Hohman, Jr.	Democratic	Bethel
F	Tim Kelly	Republican	Anchorage
D	Jalmar M. Kerttula	Democratic	Palmer
B	H. D. "Pete" Meland	Democratic	Sitka
L	Bob Mulcahy	Republican	Kodiak
C	Bill Ray	Democratic	Juneau
G	Patrick M. Rodey	Democratic	Anchorage
N	John C. Sackett	Republican	Galena
E	Terry Stimson	Democratic	Anchorage
H	Arliss Sturgulewski	Republican	Anchorage
E	Bill Sumner	Republican	Anchorage
K	Clem V. Tillion	Republican	Homer
A	Robert H. Ziegler, Sr.	Democratic	Ketchikan

== House ==
District	Name	Party	Location
16	Nels A. Anderson, Jr.	Democratic	Dillingham
10	Ramona L. Barnes	Republican	Anchorage
7	Michael F. Beirne	Republican	Anchorage
20	Robert H. Bettisworth	Republican	College
5	Margaret Branson	Republican	Cooper Landing
20	Fred E. Brown	Democratic	Fairbanks
9	Thelma Buchholdt	Democratic	Anchorage
6	Patrick J. Carney	Democratic	Wasilla
10	C. V. Chatterton	Republican	Anchorage
8	Samuel R. Cotten	Democratic	Eagle River
4	Jim Duncan	Democratic	Juneau
3	Richard I. Eliason	Republican	Sitka
1	Oral E. Freeman	Democratic	Ketchikan
22	John G. "Jack" Fuller	Democratic	Nome
1	Terry Gardiner	Democratic	Ketchikan
17	Phillip Guy	Democratic	Kwethluk
8	Richard W. Halford	Republican	Chugiak
2	E. J. Haugen	Republican	Petersburg
12	Joe L. Hayes	Republican	Anchorage
18	Vernon L. Hurlbert	Democratic	Sleetmute
13	Hugh Malone	Democratic	Kenai
8	Terry Martin	Republican	Anchorage
9	Joseph H. McKinnon	Democratic	Anchorage
7	Russ Meekins, Jr.	Democratic	Anchorage
11	Ray H. Metcalfe	Republican	Anchorage
7	Bill Miles	Democratic	Anchorage
4	M. Michael Miller	Democratic	Juneau
12	Joe D. Montgomery	Republican	Anchorage
19	H. Pappy Moss	Democratic	Delta Junction
11	Joyce Munson	Democratic	Anchorage
13	Patrick M. O'Connell	Republican	Soldotna
15	Alvin Osterback	Democratic	Sand Point
7	William K. Parker	Democratic	Anchorage
20	Charles H. Parr	Democratic	Fairbanks
8	Randy E. Phillips	Republican	Eagle River
20	Richard L. Randolph	Libertarian	Fairbanks
20	Brian D. Rogers	Democratic	Fairbanks
21	Leo P. Schaeffer, Jr.	Democratic	Kobuk
20	Sarah J. "Sally" Smith	Democratic	Fairbanks
14	Fred F. Zharoff	Democratic	Kodiak

== See also ==
- List of Alaska State Legislatures
- 10th Alaska State Legislature, the legislature preceding this one
- 12th Alaska State Legislature, the legislature following this one
- List of governors of Alaska
- List of speakers of the Alaska House of Representatives
- Alaska Legislature
- Alaska Senate
- AKLeg.gov

== Notes ==
1. Representative Bill Miles (D) resigned October 15, 1980; vacancy not filled.
