= 12th Alaska State Legislature =

Term of state legislature in Alaska, US

The Twelfth Alaska State Legislature served from January 1981 to January 1983.

== Senate ==
District	Name	Party	Location
O	Don Bennett	Republican	Fairbanks
F	W. E. "Brad" Bradley	Republican	Anchorage
I	Mike Colletta	Republican	Anchorage
J	Ed Dankworth	Republican	Anchorage
B	Richard I. Eliason	Republican	Sitka
O	Bettye Fahrenkamp	Democratic	Fairbanks
P	Frank R. Ferguson	Democratic	Kotzebue
E	Victor Fischer	Democratic	Anchorage
K	Donald E. Gilman	Republican	Kenai
M	George H. Hohman, Jr.	Democratic	Bethel
F	Tim Kelly	Republican	Anchorage
D	Jalmar M. Kerttula	Democratic	Palmer
L	Bob Mulcahy	Republican	Kodiak
O	Charles H. Parr	Democratic	Fairbanks
C	Bill Ray	Democratic	Juneau
G	Patrick M. Rodey	Democratic	Anchorage
N	John C. Sackett	Republican	Ruby
E	Terry Stimson	Democratic	Anchorage
H	Arliss Sturgulewski	Republican	Anchorage
A	Robert H. Ziegler, Sr.	Democratic	Ketchikan

== House ==
District	Name	Party	Location
9	Mitchell E. Abood, Jr.	Republican	Anchorage
21	Albert P. Adams	Democratic	Kotzebue
10	Charles G. Anderson	Republican	Anchorage
10	Ramona L. Barnes	Republican	Anchorage
7	Michael F. Beirne	Republican	Anchorage
20	Robert H. Bettisworth	Republican	College
20	Fred E. Brown	Democratic	Fairbanks
9	Thelma Buchholdt	Democratic	Anchorage
11	Bernard Bylsma	Republican	Anchorage
6	Patrick J. Carney	Democratic	Wasilla
5	Bette M. Cato	Democratic	Valdez
16	Joseph Chuckwuk	Democratic	Dillingham
7	Donald E. Clocksin	Democratic	Anchorage
8	Samuel R. Cotten	Democratic	Eagle River
7	David W. Cuddy	Republican	Anchorage
4	Jim Duncan	Democratic	Juneau
20	Kenneth J. Fanning	Libertarian	College
1	Oral E. Freeman	Democratic	Ketchikan
22	John G. "Jack" Fuller	Democratic	Nome
1	Terry Gardiner	Democratic	Ketchikan
3	Ben F. Grussendorf	Democratic	Sitka
8	Richard W. Halford	Republican	Chugiak
2	E. J. Haugen	Republican	Petersburg
12	Joe L. Hayes	Republican	Anchorage
18	Vernon L. Hurlbert	Democratic	Sleetmute
13	Hugh Malone	Democratic	Kenai
8	Terry Martin	Republican	Anchorage
7	Russ Meekins, Jr.	Democratic	Anchorage
11	Ray H. Metcalfe	Republican	Anchorage
4	M. Michael Miller	Democratic	Juneau
12	Joe D. Montgomery	Republican	Anchorage
19	H. Pappy Moss	Democratic	Delta Junction
13	Patrick M. O'Connell	Republican	Soldotna
8	Randy E. Phillips	Republican	Eagle River
20	Richard L. Randolph	Libertarian	Fairbanks
20	Brian D. Rogers	Democratic	Fairbanks
20	Sarah J. "Sally" Smith	Democratic	Fairbanks
15	Eric G. Sutcliffe	Republican	Unalaska
17	Anthony N. Vaska	Democratic	Bethel
14	Fred F. Zharoff	Democratic	Kodiak

== See also ==
- List of Alaska State Legislatures
- 11th Alaska State Legislature, the legislature preceding this one
- 13th Alaska State Legislature, the legislature following this one
- List of governors of Alaska
- List of speakers of the Alaska House of Representatives
- Alaska Legislature
- Alaska Senate
- AKLeg.gov

== Notes ==
- 1. Senator George H. Hohman, Jr. (D) was expelled on February 5, 1982. Nels Anderson, Jr. (D) was appointed on March 2, 1982, and confirmed on March 3, 1982, to fill the vacancy.
- 2. Representative Jim Duncan (D) was Speaker of the House through June 15, 1981. Representative Joe L. Hayes (R) was elected Speaker of the House on June 16, 1981.
