= 13th Alaska State Legislature =

Term of state legislature in Alaska, US

The Thirteenth Alaska State Legislature was a session of the Legislature of Alaska that first convened on January 17, 1983, and adjourned June 27, 1983. The second session was from January 9, 1984, to June 8, 1984. Jack McBride, a Democrat of the 1-B Ketchikan district, died on April 16, 1984, and was replaced by Democrat John L. Sund. The Senate President was Jay Kerttula and the Speaker of the House was Joe L. Hayes.

== Senate ==
Name	District	Seat	Location	Party
Don Bennett	K	A	Fairbanks	Republican
Dick Eliason	B		Sitka	Republican
Bettye Fahrenkamp	K	B	Fairbanks	Democratic
Jan Faiks	E	B	Anchorage	Republican
Frank R. Ferguson	L		Kotzebue	Democratic
Paul A. Fischer	D	A	Soldotna	Republican
Vic Fischer	G	B	Anchorage	Democratic
Donald E. Gilman	D	B	Kenai	Republican
Richard W. Halford	H	A	Chugiak	Republican
Joseph P. Josephson	G	A	Anchorage	Democratic
Tim Kelly	H	B	Anchorage	Republican
Jay Kerttula	I		Palmer	Democratic
H. Pappy Moss	J		Delta Junction	Democratic
Bob Mulcahy	N		Kodiak	Republican
Fritz Pettyjohn	E	A	Anchorage	Republican
Bill Ray	C		Juneau	Democratic
Patrick M. Rodey	F	B	Anchorage	Democratic
John C. Sackett	M		Ruby	Republican
Arliss Sturgulewski	F	A	Anchorage	Republican
Robert H. Ziegler Sr.	A		Ketchikan	Democratic

== House ==
Name	District	Seat	Location	Party
Mitchell E. Abood Jr.	11	A	Anchorage	Republican
Albert P. Adams	22		Kotzebue	Democratic
Ramona L. Barnes	14	A	Anchorage	Republican
Robert H. Bettisworth	20	A	Fairbanks	Republican
Charles Bussell	10	A	Anchorage	Republican
Bette M. Cato	6		Valdez	Democratic
Donald E. Clocksin	12	B	Anchorage	Democratic
John Cowdery	8	A	Anchorage	Republican
Mike Davis	19		Fairbanks	Democratic
Jim Duncan	4	B	Juneau	Democratic
Joe Flood	9	B	Anchorage	Democratic
Milo H. Fritz	5	B	Anchor Point	Republican
John G. "Jack" Fuller	23		Nome	Democratic
Walter R. Furnace	14	B	Anchorage	Republican
Peter Goll	2		Haines	Democratic
Ben F. Grussendorf	3		Sitka	Democratic
Joe L. Hayes	9	A	Anchorage	Republican
Adelheid Herrmann	26		Naknek	Democratic
Vernon L. Hurlbert	24		Sleetmute	Democratic
Niilo Koponen	21		Fairbanks	Democratic
Barbara Lacher	16	A	Wasilla	Republican
Ronald L. Larson	16	B	Palmer	Democratic
John Lindauer	10	B	Anchorage	Republican
John J. Liska	15	A	Eagle River	Republican
Hugh Malone	5	A	Kenai	Democratic
Terry Martin	13	A	Anchorage	Republican
Jack McBride	1	B	Ketchikan	Democratic
John L. Sund	1	B	Ketchikan	Democratic
M. Michael Miller	4	A	Juneau	Democratic
Mike W. Miller	18		North Pole	Republican
Sam Pestinger	8	B	Anchorage	Republican
Randy E. Phillips	15	B	Eagle River	Republican
John Ringstad	20	B	Fairbanks	Republican
Richard ‘Dick’ Shultz	17		Delta Junction	Republican
Mike Szymanski	7		Anchorage	Democratic
Mae Tischer	11	B	Anchorage	Republican
Rick Uehling	12	A	Anchorage	Republican
Anthony N. Vaska	25		Bethel	Democratic
Jerry Ward	13	A	Anchorage	Republican
Ron Wendte	1	A	Ketchikan	Democratic
Fred F. Zharoff	27		Kodiak	Democratic

== See also ==
- List of Alaska State Legislatures
- File:1983-1984 Alaska State Legislature directory.pdf
