= 9th Alaska State Legislature =

Term of state legislature in Alaska, US

The Ninth Alaska State Legislature served from January 1975 to January 1977.

== Senate ==
District	Name	Party	Location
F	W. E. "Brad" Bradley	Republican	Anchorage
O	John Butrovich, Jr.	Republican	Fairbanks
E	Genie Chance	Democratic	Anchorage
I	Mike Colletta	Republican	Anchorage
E	Chancy Croft	Democratic	Anchorage
P	Frank R. Ferguson	Democratic	Kotzebue
M	George H. Hohman, Jr.	Democratic	Bethel
O	John Huber	Democratic	Fairbanks
D	Jalmar M. Kerttula	Democratic	Palmer
B	H. D. "Pete" Meland	Democratic	Sitka
O	Terry Miller	Republican	Fairbanks
H	Joseph L. Orsini	Republican	Anchorage
L	Kathryn Poland	Democratic	Kodiak
J	John L. Rader	Democratic	Anchorage
C	Bill Ray	Democratic	Juneau
G	Patrick M. Rodey	Democratic	Anchorage
N	John C. Sackett	Republican	Fairbanks
K	Clem V. Tillion	Republican	Homer
F	Edward C. Willis	Democratic	Eagle River
A	Robert H. Ziegler, Sr.	Democratic	Ketchikan

== House ==
District	Name	Party	Location
16	Nels A. Anderson, Jr.	Democratic	Dillingham
11	Helen D. Beirne	Republican	Spenard
11	Willard L. Bowman	Democratic	Anchorage
8	Bob Bradley	Democratic	Anchorage
20	Mike Bradner	Democratic	Fairbanks
20	Fred E. Brown	Democratic	Fairbanks
9	Thelma Buchholdt	Democratic	Anchorage
8	Samuel R. Cotten	Democratic	Eagle River
20	Steve Cowper	Democratic	Fairbanks
22	Larry T. Davis	Democratic	Nome
4	Jim Duncan	Democratic	Juneau
3	Richard I. Eliason	Republican	Sitka
7	Tom Fink	Republican	Anchorage
12	Helen M. Fischer	Democratic	Anchorage
1	Oral E. Freeman	Democratic	Ketchikan
1	Terry Gardiner	Democratic	Ketchikan
7	Clark Gruening	Democratic	Anchorage
17	Phillip Guy	Democratic	Kwethluk
20	W. Glenn Hackney	Republican	Fairbanks
2	E. J. Haugen	Republican	Petersburg
12	H. M. "Mike" Hershberger	Republican	Anchorage
18	James H. Huntington	Independent	Galena
21	Brenda T. Itta	Democratic	Barrow
8	Ramona M. Kelley	Democratic	Anchorage
9	Joseph H. McKinnon	Democratic	Anchorage
13	Hugh Malone	Democratic	Kenai
4	M. Michael Miller	Democratic	Juneau
14	Edward F. Naughton	Democratic	Kodiak
20	Edmund N. Orbeck	Democratic	Fairbanks
6	Alfred O. Ose	Democratic	Palmer
15	Alvin Osterback	Democratic	Sand Point
7	Kathryn Ostrosky	Democratic	Anchorage
7	William K. Parker	Democratic	Anchorage
20	Charles H. Parr	Democratic	Fairbanks
11	Leo Rhode	Republican	Homer
10	Theodore G. Smith	Democratic	Anchorage
5	Keith W. Specking	Republican	Hope
8	Susan Sullivan	Democratic	Anchorage
19	Leslie E. "Red" Swanson	Democratic	Nenana
10	Richard K. Urion	Republican	Anchorage

== See also ==
- List of Alaska State Legislatures
- 8th Alaska State Legislature, the legislature preceding this one
- 10th Alaska State Legislature, the legislature following this one
- List of governors of Alaska
- List of speakers of the Alaska House of Representatives
- Alaska Legislature
- Alaska Senate
- {AKLeg.gov}

== Notes ==
- 1. Senator W. I. "Bob" Palmer (R) resigned on November 30, 1974. Clem V. Tillion (R) resigned from his House seat on January 20, 1975, to accept appointment and confirmation the same day to the Senate seat vacated by W. I. Palmer. Leo Rhode (R) was appointed and confirmed on January 20, 1975, to fill the vacancy in the House.
- 2. Representative Willard L. Bowman (D) died on December 4, 1975. Lisa Rudd (D) was appointed and confirmed on January 12, 1976, to fill the vacancy.
- 3. Representative Helen M. Fischer (D) resigned on June 30, 1976; vacancy was not filled.
- 4. Representative Theodore G. Smith (D) resigned on November 28, 1976; vacancy was not filled.
- 5. Representative Ramona M. Kelley (D) resigned on January 9, 1977; vacancy was not filled.
- 6. Representative Tom Fink (R) resigned on April 1, 1975, and Michael F. Beirne (R) was appointed and confirmed on April 9, 1975, to fill the vacancy.
- 7. Representative Edmund N. Orbeck (D) resigned on January 4, 1975. Tim Wallis (D) was appointed January 17, 1975, and confirmed January 20, 1975, to fill the vacancy.
