= 8th Alaska State Legislature =

Term of state legislature in Alaska, US

The Eighth Alaska State Legislature served from January 1973 to January 1975.

== Senate ==
District	Name	Party	Location
J	John Butrovich, Jr.	Republican	Fairbanks
E	Chancy Croft	Democratic	Anchorage
E	Clifford J. Groh	Republican	Anchorage
E	Jess Harris	Republican	Anchorage
K	Willie Hensley	Democratic	Kotzebue
H	George H. Hohman, Jr.	Democratic	Bethel
D	Jalmar M. Kerttula	Democratic	Palmer
E	Clyde R. Lewis	Republican	Anchorage
B	H. D. "Pete" Meland	Democratic	Sitka
E	Keith H. Miller	Republican	Anchorage
J	Terry Miller	Republican	Fairbanks
F	W. I. "Bob" Palmer	Republican	Ninilchik
G	Kathryn Poland	Democratic	Kodiak
E	John L. Rader	Democratic	Anchorage
C	Bill Ray	Democratic	Juneau
E	Ron L. Rettig	Republican	Anchorage
I	John C. Sackett	Republican	Galena
E	Lowell Thomas, Jr.	Republican	Anchorage
J	Donald E. Young	Republican	Fort Yukon
A	Robert H. Ziegler, Sr.	Democratic	Ketchikan

== House ==
District	Name	Party	Location
4	Mildred H. Banfield	Republican	Juneau
7	Edward G. Barber	Democratic	Anchorage
10	Helen D. Beirne	Republican	Spenard
10	Willard L. Bowman	Democratic	Anchorage
17	Mike Bradner	Democratic	Fairbanks
17	Selwyn Carrol	Republican	Fairbanks
7	Genie Chance	Democratic	Anchorage
20	Chuck Degnan	Democratic	Unalakleet
3	Richard I. Eliason	Republican	Sitka
19	Frank R. Ferguson	Nonpartisan	Kotzebue
8	Tom Fink	Republican	Anchorage
8	Helen M. Fischer	Democratic	Anchorage
1	Oral E. Freeman	Democratic	Ketchikan
9	Milo H. Fritz	Republican	Anchorage
1	Terry Gardiner	Democratic	Ketchikan
15	Phillip Guy	Democratic	Kwethluk
17	W. Glenn Hackney	Republican	Fairbanks
9	Robert Hartig	Republican	Anchorage
2	E. J. Haugen	Republican	Petersburg
9	Earl D. Hillstrand	Democratic	Anchorage
17	John Huber	Democratic	Fairbanks
13	Jacob Laktonen, Jr.	Republican	Larsen Bay
14	Joseph E. McGill	Democratic	Dillingham
10	Richard L. McVeigh	Democratic	Anchorage
11	Hugh Malone	Democratic	Kenai
7	Russ Meekins, Jr.	Democratic	Anchorage
7	Jo Ann Miller	Republican	Anchorage
4	M. Michael Miller	Democratic	Juneau
12	Edward F. Naughton	Democratic	Kodiak
9	Joseph L. Orsini	Republican	Anchorage
6	Alfred O. Ose	Democratic	Palmer
7	William K. Parker	Democratic	Anchorage
16	Lawrence D. Petersen	Democratic	Fort Yukon
17	Richard L. Randolph	Republican	Fairbanks
8	A. M. Saylors	Republican	Anchorage
5	Keith W. Specking	Republican	Hope
11	Clem V. Tillion	Republican	Homer
9	Richard K. Urion	Republican	Anchorage
17	Andrew S. Warwick	Republican	Fairbanks
18	I. Lavell Wilson	Republican	Tok

== See also ==
- List of Alaska State Legislatures
- 7th Alaska State Legislature, the legislature preceding this one
- 9th Alaska State Legislature, the legislature following this one
- List of governors of Alaska
- List of speakers of the Alaska House of Representatives
- Alaska Legislature
- Alaska Senate
- {AKLeg.gov}

== Notes ==
- 1. Nicholas J. Begich (D) died on October 16, 1972. Senator Don Young (R) resigned March 6, 1973, to fill the vacancy created in the U. S. House. George C. Silides (R) was appointed April 2, 1973, and confirmed April 3, 1973, to fill the vacancy.
- 2. Representative Earl D. Hillstrand (D) died on January 22, 1974. Charles O. Wingrove (D) was appointed and confirmed February 1, 1974, to fill the vacancy.
- 3. Senator W. I. "Bob" Palmer (R) resigned November 30, 1974. Clem V. Tillion (R) was appointed and confirmed January 20, 1975, to fill the vacancy.
- 4. Senator Lowell Thomas, Jr. (R) resigned December 2, 1974. Representative A. M. Saylors (R) resigned December 20, 1974, and Representative Andrew S. Warwick (R) resigned December 9, 1974; vacancies were not filled.
