= 10th Alaska State Legislature =

Term of state legislature in Alaska, US

The Tenth Alaska State Legislature served from January 1977 to January 1979.

== Senate ==
District	Name	Party	Location
A	Robert H. Ziegler, Sr.	Democratic	Ketchikan
B	H. D. "Pete" Meland	Democratic	Sitka
C	Bill Ray	Democratic	Juneau
D	Jalmar M. Kerttula	Democratic	Palmer
E	Chancy Croft	Democratic	Anchorage
E	Bill Sumner	Republican	Anchorage
F	W. E. "Brad" Bradley	Republican	Eagle River
F	Edward C. Willis	Democratic	Anchorage
G	Patrick M. Rodey	Democratic	Anchorage
H	Joseph L. Orsini	Republican	Anchorage
I	Mike Colletta	Republican	Anchorage
J	John L. Rader	Republican	Anchorage
K	Clem V. Tillion	Republican	Homer
L	Kathryn Poland	Democratic	Kodiak
M	George H. Hohman, Jr.	Democratic	Bethel
N	John C. Sackett	Republican	Galena
O	John Butrovich, Jr.	Republican	Fairbanks
O	W. Glenn Hackney	Republican	Fairbanks
O	John Huber	Democratic	Fairbanks
P	Frank R. Ferguson	Democratic	Kotzebue

== House ==
District	Name	Party	Location
1	Oral E. Freeman	Democratic	Ketchikan
1	Terry Gardiner	Democratic	Ketchikan
2	Ernest J. Haugen	Republican	Petersburg
3	Richard I. Eliason	Republican	Sitka
4	Jim Duncan	Democratic	Juneau
4	M. Michael Miller	Democratic	Juneau
5	Keith W. Specking (1-3-77 - 4-25-77)	Republican	Hope
5	Peter Lovseth (5-4-77 - 1-2-79)	Republican	Hope
6	Alfred O. Ose	Democratic	Palmer
7	Michael F. Beirne	Republican	Anchorage
7	Clark Gruening	Democratic	Anchorage
7	Russ Meekins, Jr.	Democratic	Anchorage
7	Bill Miles	Democratic	Anchorage
8	Bob Bradley	Republican	Anchorage
8	Samuel R. Cotten	Democratic	Eagle River
8	Tim Kelly	Republican	Anchorage
8	Randy Phillips	Republican	Eagle River
9	Thelma Buchholdt	Democratic	Anchorage
9	Joseph H. McKinnon	Democratic	Anchorage
10	C. V. Chatterton	Republican	Anchorage
10	Richard K. Urion	Republican	Anchorage
11	Kris W. Lethin	Republican	Anchorage
11	Lisa Rudd	Democratic	Anchorage
12	Ed Dankworth	Republican	Anchorage
12	Joe L. Hayes	Republican	Anchorage
13	Hugh Malone	Democratic	Anchorage
13	Leo Rhode	Republican	Homer
14	Merle G. Snider	Democratic	Kodiak
15	Alvin Osterback	Democratic	Sand Point
16	Martin Severson (1-3-77 - 3-11-77)	Democratic	Dillingham
16	Nels A. Anderson, Jr. (3-11-77 - 1-2-79)	Democratic	Dillingham
17	Phillip Guy	Democratic	Kwethluk
18	William Akers	Republican	Emmonak
19	Leslie E. "Red" Swanson	Democratic	Nenana
20	Don Bennett	Republican	Fairbanks
20	Fred E. Brown	Democratic	Fairbanks
20	Larry Carpenter	Republican	Fairbanks
20	Steve Cowper	Democratic	Fairbanks
20	Charles H. Parr	Democratic	Fairbanks
20	Sarah J. "Sally" Smith	Democratic	Fairbanks
21	Leo P. Schaeffer, Jr.	Democratic	Kotzebue
22	Alfred C. Nakak	Democratic	Nome

== See also ==
- List of Alaska State Legislatures
- 9th Alaska State Legislature, the legislature preceding this one
- 11th Alaska State Legislature, the legislature following this one
- List of governors of Alaska
- List of speakers of the Alaska House of Representatives
- Alaska Legislature
- Alaska Senate
- AKLeg.gov
