= 7th Alaska State Legislature =

Term of state legislature in Alaska, US

The Seventh Alaska State Legislature served from January 1971 to January 1973.

== Senate ==
District	Name	Party	Location
B	Howard C. Bradshaw	Democratic	Sitka
I	John Butrovich, Jr.	Republican	Fairbanks
K	Raymond C. Christiansen	Democratic	Bethel
E	Chancy Croft	Democratic	Anchorage
E	Clifford J. Groh	Republican	Anchorage
H	Jay S. Hammond	Republican	Naknek
J	Willie Hensley	Democratic	Kotzebue
E	Joseph P. Josephson	Democratic	Anchorage
D	Jan M. Koslosky	Republican	Palmer
E	Clyde R. Lewis	Republican	Anchorage
B	H. D. "Pete" Meland	Democratic	Sitka
I	Edward A. Merdes	Democratic	Fairbanks
I	Terry Miller	Republican	North Pole
F	W. I. "Bob" Palmer	Republican	Ninilchik
G	Kathryn Poland	Democratic	Kodiak
E	John L. Rader	Democratic	Anchorage
C	Bill Ray	Democratic	Juneau
E	Ron L. Rettig	Republican	Anchorage
E	Lowell Thomas, Jr.	Republican	Anchorage
I	Donald E. Young	Republican	Fort Yukon
A	Robert H. Ziegler, Sr.	Democratic	Ketchikan

== House ==
District	Name	Party	Location
4	Mildred H. Banfield	Republican	Juneau
8	Edward G. Barber	Democratic	Anchorage
8	Willard L. Bowman	Democratic	Anchorage
16	Mike Bradner	Democratic	Fairbanks
8	Genie Chance	Democratic	Anchorage
8	Mike Colletta	Republican	Anchorage
18	Chuck Degnan	Democratic	Nome
6	Robert I. Ditman	Democratic	Valdez
8	Marty Farrell	Democratic	Anchorage
17	Frank R. Ferguson	Democratic	Kotzebue
8	Tom Fink	Republican	Anchorage
8	Helen M. Fischer	Democratic	Anchorage
3	Edward J. Flynn	Democratic	Sitka
8	Gene Guess	Democratic	Anchorage
8	Jess Harris	Republican	Anchorage
2	E. J. Haugen	Republican	Petersburg
8	Earl D. Hillstrand	Democratic	Anchorage
14	George H. Hohman, Jr.	Democratic	Bethel
16	John Holm	Republican	Fairbanks
16	John Huber	Democratic	Fairbanks
7	Jalmar M. Kerttula	Democratic	Palmer
13	Joseph E. McGill	Democratic	Dillingham
8	Richard L. McVeigh	Democratic	Anchorage
3	H. D. "Pete" Meland	Democratic	Sitka
16	Eugene V. Miller	Democratic	Fairbanks
4	M. Michael Miller	Democratic	Juneau
19	Martin B. Moore	Democratic	Emmonak
8	William J. Moran	Democratic	Anchorage
12	Carl E. Moses	Democratic	Unalaska
11	Edward F. Naughton	Democratic	Kodiak
16	Edmund N. Orbeck	Democratic	Fairbanks
1	Frank Peratrovich	Democratic	Klawock
16	Richard L. Randolph	Republican	Fairbanks
5	Morgan W. Reed	Democratic	Skagway
8	Mike Rose	Democratic	Anchorage
9	Keith W. Specking	Republican	Hope
15	Leslie E. "Red" Swanson	Democratic	Nenana
10	Clem V. Tillion	Republican	Halibut Cove
16	Andrew S. Warwick	Democratic	Fairbanks
1	Richard Whittaker	Democratic	Ketchikan
8	Joshua J. Wright	Democratic	Anchorage

== See also ==
- List of Alaska State Legislatures
- 6th Alaska State Legislature, the legislature preceding this one
- 8th Alaska State Legislature, the legislature following this one
- List of governors of Alaska
- List of speakers of the Alaska House of Representatives
- Alaska Legislature
- Alaska Senate
- {AKLeg.gov}

== Notes ==
- Howard C. Bradshaw resigned, succeeded by H. D. "Pete" Meland.
- Joseph P. Josephson resigned in August 1972; the vacancy was not filled.
