= List of speakers of the Alaska House of Representatives =

Speaker of the Alaska House of Representatives
- Alaskan state seal
- Incumbent; Bryce Edgmon since January 21, 2025
- Formation: 1913
- First holder: Earnest B. Collins

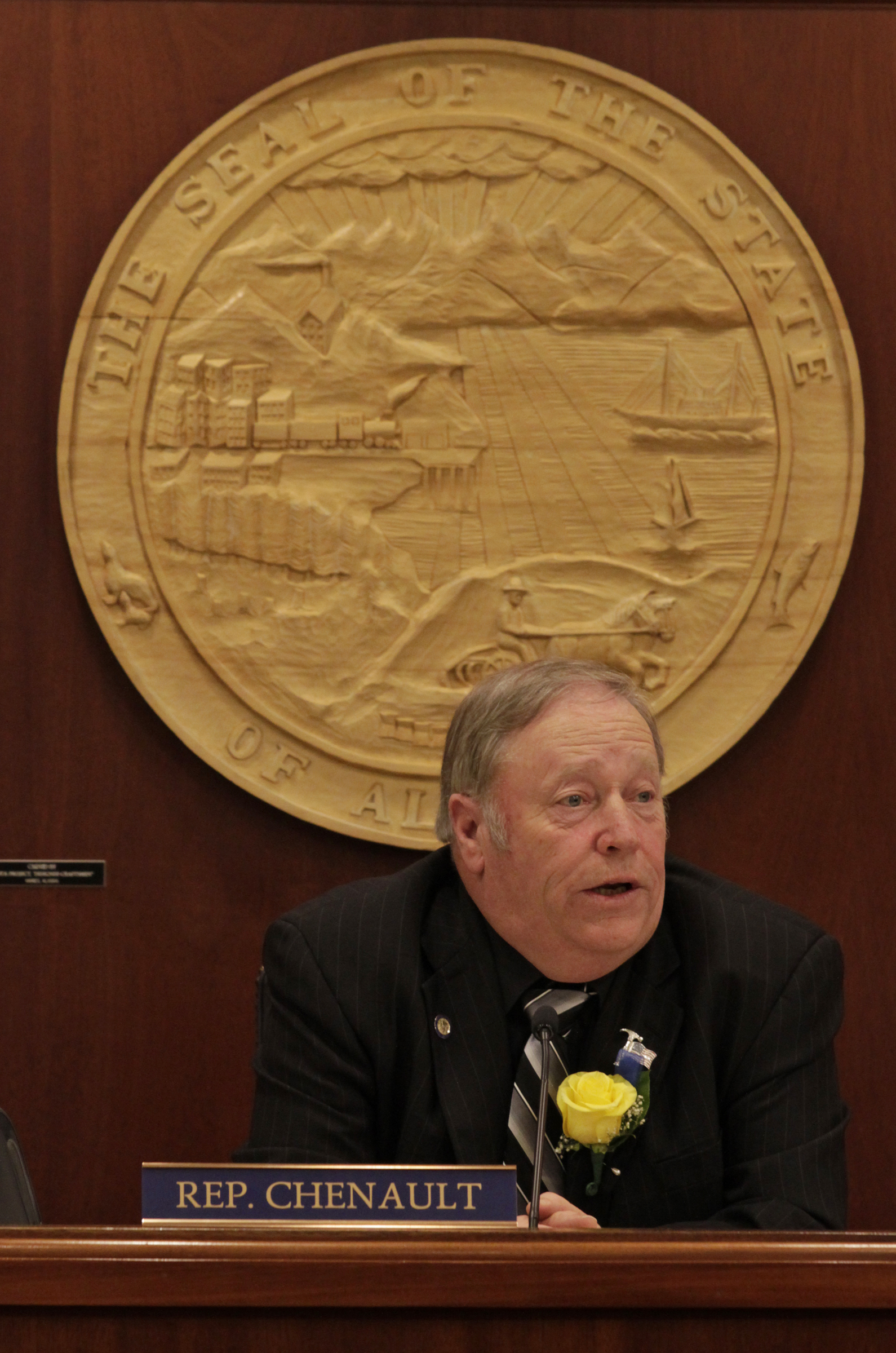
Mike Chenault is the longest-serving speaker, holding the office for four terms from 2009 to 2017. He is shown seated at the speaker's chair at the start of the 29th Legislature in January 2015. A large wood carving depicting the state seal hangs on the wall behind him.

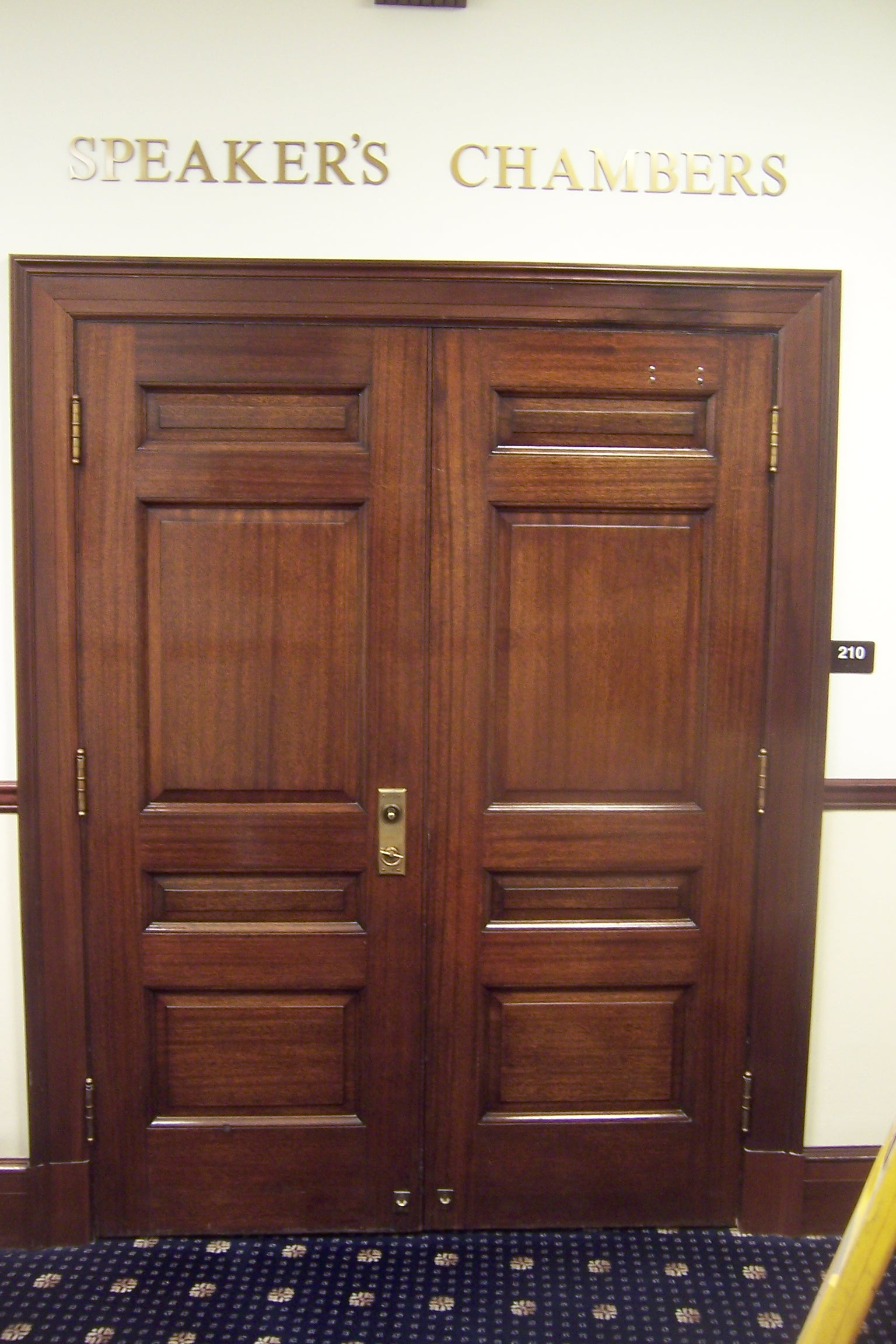
The front entrance to the Speaker's chambers in the Alaska State Capitol.

This is a list of speakers of the Alaska House of Representatives. The speaker is the presiding officer of the Alaska House of Representatives. This list covers both the territorial House (convened mostly biennially between 1913 and 1957) and the state House (convened annually since 1959).

== Speakers ==
=== Territorial House ===
No.	Name	Image	Party	Hometown	Division	Term	Legislatures
1	Earnest B. Collins		Republican	Fox	4th	1913–1917	1st, 2nd
2	Luther C. Hess		Democratic	Fairbanks	4th	1917–1919	3rd
3	E. J. White		Democratic	Juneau	1st	1919–1921	4th
4	Andrew Nerland		Republican	Fairbanks	4th	1921–1923	5th
5	Cash Cole		Republican	Juneau	1st	1923–1925	6th
6	C. H. Wilcox		Democratic	Valdez	3rd	1925–1927	7th
7	Sumner S. Smith		Republican	Anchorage	3rd	1927–1929	8th
8	R. C. Rothenburg		Independent Republican	Fairbanks	4th	1929–1931	9th
9	Grover C. Winn		Republican	Juneau	1st	1931–1933	10th
10	Joe McDonald		Democratic	Ester Creek	4th	1933–1935	11th
11	Joseph S. Hofman		Democratic	Seward	3rd	1935–1937	12th
12	Joe Green		Democratic	Hyder	1st	1937–1939	13th
13	Howard Lyng		Democratic	Nome	2nd	1939–1941	14th
14	Herbert H. McCutcheon		Democratic	Anchorage	3rd	1941–1943	15th
15	James V. Davis		Democratic	Juneau	1st	1943–1945	16th
16	Jesse D. Lander		Democratic	Fairbanks	4th	1945–1947	17th
17	Oscar S. Gill		Republican	Anchorage	3rd	1947–1949	18th
18	Stanley McCutcheon		Democratic	Anchorage	3rd	1949–1951	19th
19	William A. Egan		Democratic	Valdez	3rd	1951–1953	20th
20	George Miscovich		Republican	Fairbanks	4th	1953–1955	21st
21	Wendell P. Kay		Democratic	Anchorage	3rd	1955–1957	22nd
22	Richard J. Greuel		Democratic	Fairbanks	4th	1957–1959	23rd

=== State House ===
No.	Name	Image	Party	Hometown	District	Term	Legislatures
1	Warren A. Taylor		Democratic	Fairbanks	19	1959–1963	1st, 2nd
2	Bruce Kendall		Republican	Anchorage	8	1963–1965	3rd
3	Mike Gravel		Democratic	Anchorage	8	1965–1967	4th
4	William K. Boardman		Republican	Ketchikan	1	1967–1969	5th
5	Jalmar M. Kerttula		Democratic	Palmer	7	1969–1971	6th
6	Gene Guess		Democratic	Anchorage	8	1971–1973	7th
7	Tom Fink		Republican (coalition)	Anchorage	8	1973–1975	8th
8	Mike Bradner		Democratic	Fairbanks	20	1975–1977	9th
9	Hugh Malone		Democratic	Kenai	13	1977–1979	10th
10	Terry Gardiner		Democratic	Ketchikan	1	1979–1981	11th
11	Jim Duncan		Democratic	Juneau	4	1981–1981	12th
12	Joseph L. Hayes		Republican (Tri-partisan coalition)	Anchorage	12, 9	1981–1985	12th, 13th
13	Ben F. Grussendorf		Democratic	Sitka	3	1985–1989	14th, 15th
14	Samuel R. Cotten		Democratic	Eagle River	15	1989–1991	16th
15	Ben F. Grussendorf		Democratic	Sitka	3	1991–1993	17th
16	Ramona L. Barnes		Republican (Republican majority coalition)	Anchorage	22	1993–1995	18th
17	Gail Phillips		Republican	Homer	7	1995–1999	19th, 20th
18	Brian Porter		Republican	Anchorage	20	1999–2003	21st, 22nd
19	Pete Kott		Republican	Eagle River	17	2003–2005	23rd
20	John Harris		Republican	Valdez	12	2005–2009	24th, 25th
21	Mike Chenault		Republican	Nikiski	34	2009–2017	26th, 27th, 28th, 29th
22	Bryce Edgmon		Democratic	Dillingham	37	2017–2021	30th, 31st
22	Bryce Edgmon		Independent (Democratic majority coalition)	Dillingham	37	2017–2021	30th, 31st
23	Louise Stutes		Republican (Democratic majority coalition)	Kodiak	32	2021–2023	32nd
23	Cathy Tilton		Republican (Republican majority coalition)	Wasilla	26	2023–2025	33rd
24	Bryce Edgmon		Independent (Democratic majority coalition)	Dillingham	37	2025–present	34th

== See also ==
- List of Alaska state legislatures
