= Bettye Davis =

American politician (1938–2018)

Member of the Alaska Senate from the K district
- In office January 8, 2001 – January 15, 2013
- Preceded by: Tim Kelly
- Succeeded by: redistricted

Member of the Alaska House of Representatives from the 21st district
- In office January 18, 1993 – January 13, 1997
- Preceded by: redistricted
- Succeeded by: Joe Ryan

Member of the Alaska House of Representatives from the 14th district
- In office January 21, 1991 – January 18, 1993 Serving with Ramona L. Barnes
- Preceded by: Walter R. Furnace
- Succeeded by: redistricted

Personal details
- Born: Bettye Jean Ivory; May 17, 1938 Homer, Louisiana
- Died: December 2, 2018 (aged 80) Anchorage, Alaska
- Party: Democratic
- Spouse: Widowed
- Education: Grambling State University
- Profession: Social worker

Bettye Jean Davis (née Ivory; May 17, 1938 – December 2, 2018) was an American social worker and politician. She was the first African-American to be elected as an Alaska State Senator in 2000.

Davis was a Democratic Party member of the Alaska House of Representatives, representing the fourteenth and twenty-first districts from 1991 through 1996 and the Alaska Senate, representing the K District from 2000 through 2013. During her time in the Alaska Senate she co-sponsored legislation introduced by Representative Sharon M. Cissna to address the needs of Alaska's aging adult population. Senator Davis was referred to as "the conscience of the Legislature" due to her advocacy for programs which supported vulnerable Alaskans.

She was inducted into the Alaska Women's Hall of Fame in 2010. She was defeated in the 2012 general election for State Senate district M by Anna Fairclough. In April 2013 she was elected to the Anchorage School Board, a body on which she'd served non-consecutive terms in the 1980s and 1990s. Davis died at her home in Anchorage at the age of 80.

In July 2020, Bettye Davis East Anchorage High School, a high school in Anchorage was renamed in her honor.

== Biography ==
=== Early life ===
Davis was born to Daniel and Rosyland Ivory on May 17, 1938, in Homer, Louisiana and graduated from Elliott High School in Bernice, La.

=== Education ===
Davis graduated from Elliott High School in Bernice, Louisiana in 1956. She received her bachelor's degree in social work from Grambling State University in 1972, her nursing degree from Saint Anthony College of Nursing in 1961 and completed graduate level studies in social work at the University of Alaska Anchorage.

=== Expanded description ===
She resided in Anchorage, Alaska for over 45 years where she was an active member of the Shiloh Missionary Baptist Church. Davis served on the NAACP Anchorage branch board of directors for four years (1978–1982).

== Significant legislation ==
As a result of the 2004 bipartisan Legislative hearing, "Aging Adults: Is there room for us in Alaska," which captured testimony from hundreds of aging Alaskans, their families and caregivers, Davis helped develop the SeniorCare program. SeniorCare (2004) sought to fill a need for prescription drug relief following the cut of the Alaska Longevity Bonus program in 2003 and prior to the implementation of the Federal Medicare prescription drug program in 2006. Additionally, 39 recommendations were put forth as a result of the panel discussions and testimony collected during the legislative hearing. Recommendations addressed critical needs and improvements to senior services in areas of organizational effectiveness, program development, program integrity, research and education and funding.

== Honors, decorations, awards and distinctions ==
- Appointed by Alaska Governor Tony Knowles to the State Board of Education (1998).
- Pioneer Woman of the Year Award, 2010.
- Recipient of the Celebrate Liberty Award from the Alaska Civil Liberties Union, 2010.
- Inducted into the Alaska Women's Hall of Fame in 2010.
- A profile of Davis was featured as part of the Anchorage Museum's, Extra Tough: Women of the North Exhibit, 2020.
- In July 2020, Bettye Davis East Anchorage High School, a high school in Anchorage was renamed in her honor.
