= Brian Porter =

Brian Porter may refer to:

- Brian Porter (cricketer), Australian cricketer
- Brian J. Porter, Canadian banker
- Brian S. Porter, member of the Alaska House of Representatives
