= Senator Pettyjohn =

Senator Pettyjohn may refer to:

- Brian G. Pettyjohn (born 1974), Delaware State Senate
- Fritz Pettyjohn (born 1945), Alaska State Senate

== See also ==
- Senator Petty (disambiguation)
