= Pignalberi =

Pignalberi is a surname. Notable people with the surname include:

- Marco Pignalberi (1944–2002), American politician
- Quirico Pignalberi (1891–1982), Italian Roman Catholic priest
