= Bette Cato =

American politician

Member of the Alaska House of Representatives from the 6th district (5th district 1981–1983)
- In office January 12, 1981 – December 31, 1989
- Preceded by: Margaret Branson
- Succeeded by: Eugene G. Kubina

Personal details
- Born: May 9, 1924 Irby, Washington
- Died: January 18, 1996 (aged 71) Phoenix, Arizona
- Party: Democratic
- Spouse: Jack Cato
- Education: Eastern Washington College
- Occupation: Schoolteacher

Bette M. Cato (May 9, 1924 – January 18, 1996) was an American politician who served in the Alaska House of Representatives from 1981 to 1989. She was a member of the Democratic Party.

== Early life and career ==
Cato was born in Irby, Washington, in 1924. She attended Eastern Washington College and earned a Bachelor of Arts in education. She settled in Alaska in 1957, working as a teacher in Kenai.

After moving to Valdez she became the president of the Valdez American Federation of Teachers and later served as the Vice President of AFT Alaska.

== Political career ==
Cato was elected to the Alaska House of Representatives in 1980. In June 1981, Cato helped elevate Republican legislator Joe L. Hayes to the House speakership.

By 1985, Cato was the House Transportation Committee chair.

Following a diagnosis of diverticulitis in 1989, Cato declared her intention to resign in October of that year. Her resignation took effect on December 31, 1989, and governor Steve Cowper appointed Eugene G. Kubina to Cato's seat.

== Personal life ==
Cato's husband Jack predeceased her. The couple had one son. Bette Cato died in on January 18, 1996, of cancer complications, at Phoenix Memorial Hospital.
