= Senator Fischer (disambiguation) =

Deb Fischer (born 1951) is a U.S. Senator from Nebraska since 2013. Senator Fischer may also refer to:

- Guy Fischer (1944–2014), Senate of France
- Paul A. Fischer (1936–2021), Alaska State Senate
- Pavel Fischer (born 1965), Senate of the Czech Republic
- Václav Fischer (born 1954), Senate of the Czech Republic
- Vic Fischer (1924–2023), Alaska State Senate

== See also ==
- Senator Fisher (disambiguation)
