= Eugene G. Kubina =

American politician (born 1948)

Eugene Kubina

Member of the Alaska House of Representatives from the 6th district
- Incumbent
- Assumed office January 8, 1990
- Preceded by: Bette M. Cato

Personal details
- Born: April 4, 1948 (age 78) Warren, Ohio
- Party: Democratic
- Spouse: Dona

Eugene G. Kubina (born April 4, 1948) is a former member of the Alaska House of Representatives, American educator, and businessman.

Born in Warren, Ohio, Kubina graduated from Pacific High School in San Bernardino, California. Kubina went to San Bernardino Valley College. He then received his bachelor's degree from San Diego State University in 1974 and his master's degree in school administration from the University of Hawaii in 1984. Kubima moved to Shishmaref, Alaska and then settled in Valdez, Alaska in 1978. He was a teacher and businessman. From 1966 to 1968, Kubina served in the United States Army. From 1989 to 1998, Kubina served in the Alaska House of Representatives and was a Democrat.
