= 1981 Anchorage mayoral election =

- October 4, 1981 (first round); October 27, 1981 (runoff)
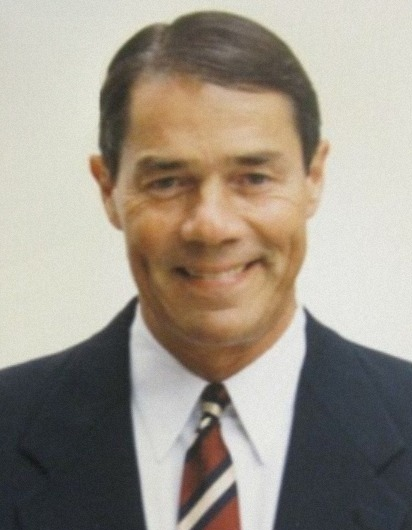

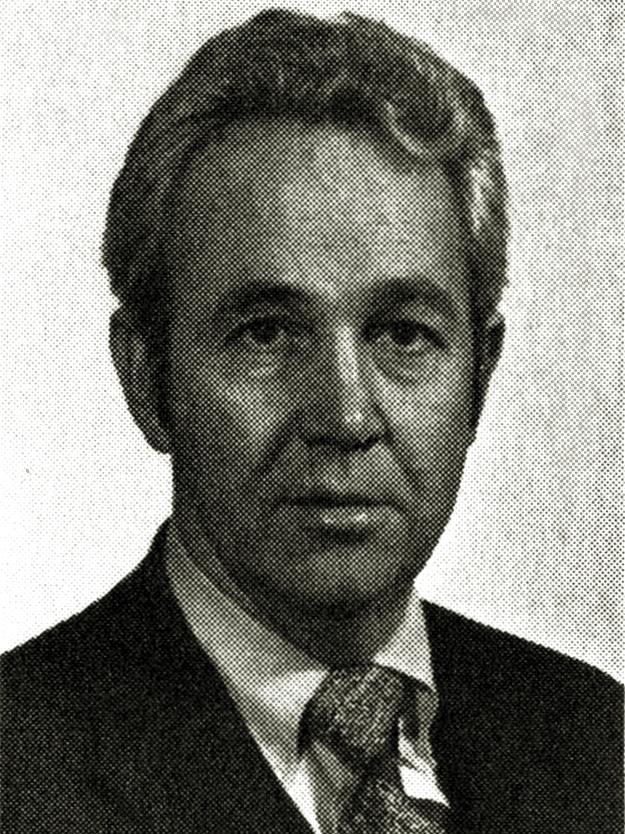

Candidate	Tony Knowles	Joe L. Hayes	Dave Walsh
First-round vote	20,090	20,059	10,090
First-round percentage	39.58%	39.51%	19.88%
Second-round vote	24,539	21,463
Second-round percentage	53.34%	46.66%
Mayor before election
George M. Sullivan
Republican
Elected mayor
Tony Knowles
Democratic

The 1981 Anchorage mayoral election was held on October 4 and October 27, 1981, to elect the mayor of Anchorage, Alaska. It saw election of Tony Knowles.

Since no candidate had received 40% of the vote in the first round(which at least one candidate was required to obtain to avoid a runoff), a runoff was held between the top-two finishers.

== Results ==
=== First round ===
Results
Party	Candidate	Votes	%
Nonpartisan	Tony Knowles	20,090	39.58
Nonpartisan	Joe L. Hayes	20,059	39.51
Nonpartisan	Dave Walsh	10,090	19.88
Nonpartisan	Matt Hammer	419	0.83
Nonpartisan	Drew M. Angel	144	0.28
Total votes		50,764	

=== Runoff ===
Results
Party	Candidate	Votes	%
Nonpartisan	Tony Knowles	24,539	53.34
Nonpartisan	Joe L. Hayes	21,463	46.66
Total votes		46,002	
