= Jack McBride (politician) =

American politician

- McBride's 1983 official legislature portrait

Member of the Alaska House of Representatives from the 1-B district
- In office January 10, 1983 – May 11, 1984
- Preceded by: Terry Gardiner or Oral E. Freeman
- Succeeded by: John Sund

Personal details
- Born: John Francis McBride; January 13, 1926 Wadena, Minnesota, U.S.
- Died: April 16, 1984 (aged 58) Wrangell, Alaska, U.S.
- Party: Democratic
- Spouse: Jeraldine Swearingen
- Education: United States Armed Forces Institute
- Occupation: Marketing Specialist

John Francis "Jack" McBride (1926–1984) was an American politician who served as a member of the Alaska House of Representatives for one term before his death.

== Life ==
McBride was born in Wadena, Minnesota on January 13, 1926 to farmer Francis McBride (1900-1979) and Gertrude Escher, the eldest of three siblings. He earned an Alaskan GED in 1977. In 1945, he earned a certificate from the United States Armed Forces Institute. Before politics, he worked as a Marketing Specialist. He was a member of the Sons of Norway. McBride was a union leader. In 1976, McBride was elected to the Ketchikan City council for a 3 year term. He was reelected to the council in 1979 and resigned in 1980. In the 1982 Alaska House of Representatives election, he was elected to the 13th Alaska Legislature and assumed office for the 1-B district in January 1983. On April 16, 1984 McBride died in office. John L. Sund was appointed on April 30 to fill the vacancy.
