= Brian S. Porter =

American politician

Brian S. Porter (born 1938) is an American legislator and Anchorage police chief who served as Speaker of the 21st and 22nd Alaska House of Representatives and Member of 18th, 19th, 20th, 21st and 22nd Alaska House of Representatives.

== Personal life ==
He was born on 2 May 1938 in Seattle and currently a resident of Anchorage, Alaska from 1951.

Alaska House of Representatives
Preceded by Bert Sharp	Member of the Alaska House of Representatives from the 20th district 1993–2003	Succeeded by Max Gruenberg
Political offices
Preceded by Gail Phillips	Speaker of the Alaska House of Representatives; 1999–2003	Succeeded by Pete Kott
