= Senator Fisher =

Senator Fisher may refer to:

- Bill Fisher (politician) (1936–2020), Oregon State Senate
- Charles Thompson Fisher (1846–1930), Wisconsin State Senate
- Charles Fisher (North Carolina politician) (1789–1849), North Carolina State Senate
- Dan Fisher (Nebraska politician) (1935–2004), Nebraska State Senate
- D. Michael Fisher (born 1944), Pennsylvania State Senate
- Fred R. Fisher (1871–1959) Wisconsin State Senate
- Hendrick V. Fisher (1846–1909), Illinois State Senate
- Horatio G. Fisher (1838–1890), Pennsylvania State Senate
- Hubert Fisher (1877–1941), Tennessee State Senate
- Ira W. Fisher (1833–1900), Wisconsin State Senate
- Jake Fisher (judge) (1871–1951), West Virginia State Senate
- James Fisher (Wisconsin politician) (1816–1901), Wisconsin State Senate
- John J. Fisher Jr. (fl. 2019), Illinois State Senate
- John Stuchell Fisher (1867–1940), Pennsylvania State Senate
- Joseph Fisher (Northern Ireland politician) (1901/1902–1963), Northern Irish Senate
- Joseph W. Fisher (1814–1900), Pennsylvania State Senate
- Lee Fisher (born 1951), Ohio State Senate
- Ted Fisher (politician) (born 1941), Oregon State Senate

== See also ==
- Senator Fischer (disambiguation)
