= Johnny Ellis =

American politician (1960–2022)

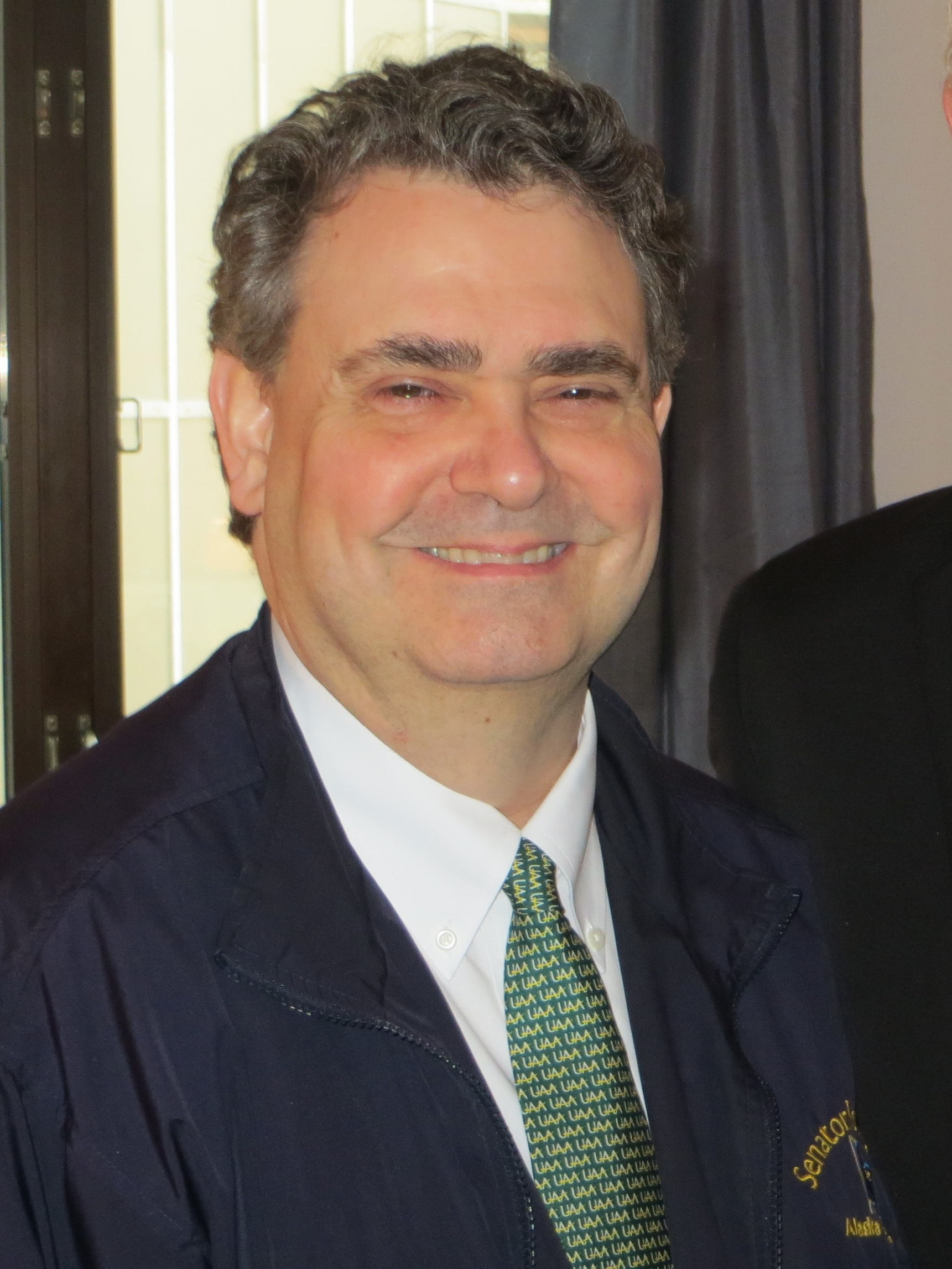
- Ellis in 2013

Majority Leader of the Alaska Senate
- In office January 19, 2009 – January 18, 2011
- Preceded by: Gary Stevens
- Succeeded by: Kevin Meyer

Member of the Alaska Senate from the I district
- In office January 15, 2013 – January 14, 2017
- Preceded by: Redistricted
- Succeeded by: Tom Begich

Member of the Alaska Senate from the L district
- In office January 20, 2003 – January 15, 2013
- Preceded by: Randy Phillips
- Succeeded by: Redistricted

Member of the Alaska Senate from the H district
- In office January 11, 1993 – January 20, 2003
- Preceded by: Pat Pourchot
- Succeeded by: Scott Ogan

Member of the Alaska House of Representatives from the 12B district
- In office January 19, 1987 – January 11, 1993
- Preceded by: Donald Clocksin
- Succeeded by: Constituency abolished

Personal details
- Born: March 13, 1960 Springfield, Missouri, U.S.
- Died: February 9, 2022 (aged 61) Harrison, Arkansas, U.S.
- Party: Democratic
- Education: University of Alaska, Anchorage (attended); Claremont McKenna College (BA)

Johnny Ellis (March 13, 1960 – February 9, 2022) was an American politician who served as a member of the Alaska Senate from 1992 to 2017. He was previously a member of the Alaska House of Representatives from 1986 through 1992.

== Early life and education ==
Ellis was born in Springfield, Missouri, and moved to Anchorage, Alaska, in 1975. Ellis was an Eagle Scout. After graduating from Bartlett High School (Anchorage, Alaska) in 1978, he attended the University of Alaska Anchorage for one year before earning a Bachelor of Arts degree from Claremont McKenna College in 1982.

== Career ==
Ellis served as a member of the Alaska House of Representatives from 1987 to 1993. He was then elected to the Alaska Senate, representing the H district from 1993 to 2003. Ellis represented the L district from 2003 to 2013 and the I district from 2013 to 2017. From 2009 to 2011, Ellis served as majority leader of the Senate. Outside of politics, Ellis was a commissioner of the Western Interstate Commission for Higher Education and operated several small businesses.

== Personal life and death ==
In 2016, Ellis spoke publicly about his health issues, including battles with prostate cancer, and multiple sclerosis. He also came out as gay.

Ellis died on February 9, 2022, at the age of 61.

Honorary titles
Preceded by Robin Taylor	Dean of the Alaska Senate; 2003–2017	Succeeded by Lyman Hoffman
Alaska Senate
Preceded by Gary Stevens	Majority Leader of the Alaska Senate; 2009–2011	Succeeded by Kevin Meyer
