= Charles G. Anderson =

American police officer and politician (1929–2022)

Charles Gustav Anderson Jr. (18 May 1929 – 30 March 2022) was an American police officer and politician.

Charles Anderson Jr., known as Chuck, was born on 18 May 1929 on Long Island in the Kodiak Archipelago. His parents were Charles Sr. and Nellie Simeonoff. Charles Sr. had immigrated to Alaska from Sweden in the 1900s and raised fox and mink on Long Island. His mother was of Russian Aleut descent. When Charles Jr. and his sister Elsie became old enough to attend school, the Andersons moved to Kodiak. Charles Jr. served in the United States Army during the Korean War, then began working for the Anchorage Police Department in 1953. Starting in 1974, Anderson spent the last seven years of his tenure on the police force as police chief. Anderson was a member of the Alaska House of Representatives serving in the 12th Alaska State Legislature as a Republican from District 10 between 1981 and 1982. Anderson subsequently served on the Cook Inlet Region, Inc. board of directors from 1987 to 2016. From 2005, he was chairman of the board.

Anderson married his wife Georgia on 8 December 1951. The couple raised two children. His son was also named Charles Gustav Anderson, and known as Charlie. Charlie died of a glioblastoma multiforme tumor in 2011. Chuck Anderson died on 30 March 2022, aged 92.
