= Martin B. Moore =

American politician (1937–2022)

Martin Moore

Member of the Alaska House of Representatives
- In office 1971–1972

Personal details
- Born: April 12, 1937 Emmonak, Alaska, U.S.
- Died: February 3, 2022 (aged 84) Bethel, Alaska, U.S.
- Profession: City Manager

Martin Billy Moore Sr. (April 12, 1937 – February 3, 2022) was an American politician from Alaska.

== Biography ==
Moore was born in Emmonak and raised in the traditional Yup'ik way of life. He attended a Bureau of Indian Affairs school in Emmonak and then attended high school in Bethel. After graduating from high school, Moore worked for the Alaska Native Service as a community aide and a health aide. He also served as a member of the Emmonak City Council.

In 1970, Moore was elected to the Alaska House of Representatives. He served one term in the House, where he advocated for rural Alaska communities and for Alaska Native rights. After leaving the House, Moore served as the city manager of Emmonak for over 30 years. In this role, he oversaw the construction of new schools, roads, and other infrastructure in Emmonak. He also worked to improve the lives of Alaska Native people in the Yukon-Kuskokwim Delta region by promoting economic development and advocating for improved access to healthcare and education.

Moore was a respected leader in the Alaska Native community. He was a board member of the Calista Corporation, a regional Alaska Native corporation, and the Yukon-Kuskokwim Health Corporation. He was also a member of the Alaska Federation of Natives.

Moore died from COVID-19 complications on February 3, 2022, at the age of 84.
