= Irby, Washington =

Unincorporated community in Washington, United States

- Unincorporated community
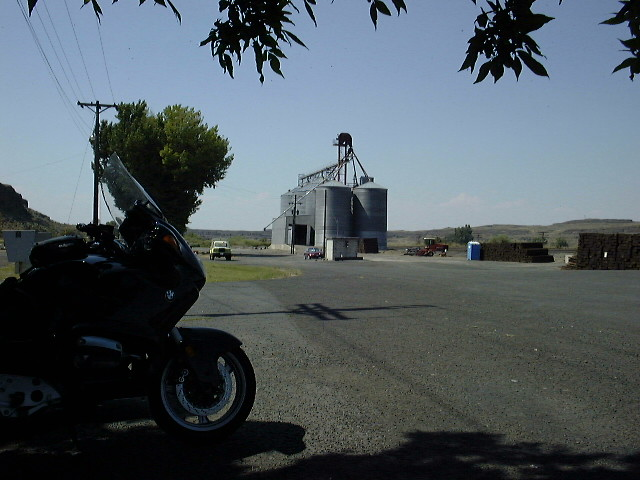
- The street in Irby features this grain elevator (1998)

- Location within Washington (state) Location within the United States
- Coordinates: 47°21′34″N 118°51′00″W
- Country: United States
- State: Washington
- County: Lincoln
- Elevation: 1,404 ft (428 m)
- Time zone: UTC-8 (Pacific (PST))
  - Summer (DST): UTC-7 (PDT)
- ZIP Code: 99159
- GNIS feature ID: 1511053

Irby is an unincorporated community in southern Lincoln County, Washington, United States, west of Odessa, north of State Route 28 on Irby Road. The BNSF Railway runs through the town. It was founded as a ranch in 1878 by John Irby. A post office called Irby was established in 1907, and remained in operation until 1962.

== Geography ==
Irby is located on Crab Creek.
