= Joyce Munson =

American politician (1930-2010)

Member of the Alaska House of Representatives from the 11th district
- In office January 15, 1979 – January 12, 1981 Serving with Ray Metcalfe
- Preceded by: Multi-member district
- Succeeded by: Bernard Bylsma

Personal details
- Born: Joyce Arnold; December 13, 1930 Guthrie, Oklahoma
- Died: June 29, 2010 (aged 79) Anchorage, Alaska
- Party: Democratic
- Children: 4
- Education: Wichita State University
- Occupation: Mental health advocate, sculptor

Joyce Arnold Munson (December 13, 1930 – June 29, 2010) was an American politician and mental health advocate. She was an elected member of the Alaska House of Representatives from January 1979 to January 1981. Before serving in the legislature, Munson was the Executive Director of the Alaska Mental Health Association.

== Early life and education ==
Munson was born in Guthrie, Oklahoma, and raised in Newton, Kansas, the daughter of Delbert Arnold and Ada Arnold (later Shuldberg). Her mother was from Utah. Munson attended Wichita State University.

== Career ==
Beginning in 1971, Munson was executive director of the Alaska Mental Health Association, and lobbied in the state capital for mental health clinics in Alaskan communities. In 1978 she ran for the Alaska House of Representatives as a Democrat, and won a seat. She served in the legislature from 1979 to 1981, and was vice chair of the committees on Commerce and Health, Education, and Social Services.

Munson ran for re-election in 1980, but lost. She ran for a seat in the state legislature again in 1982 and 1984. After her time in the legislature, Munson was deputy director of the Resource Development Council of Alaska, director of the Division of Pioneers Benefits, and a registered lobbyist.

Munson studied sculpture, and made papier-mâché figures with her children as models. She built fireplaces and swimming pools with cement at her family's home in the 1960s. In retirement, she ran a bed and breakfast, and pursued her artistic interests with her own pottery studio.

== Personal life ==
Munson was married to Joe Munson and had four children. The Munsons divorced in 1987. She died in 2010, at the age of 79, in Anchorage.
