= Joshua Wright (Alaska politician) =

American dentist and politician

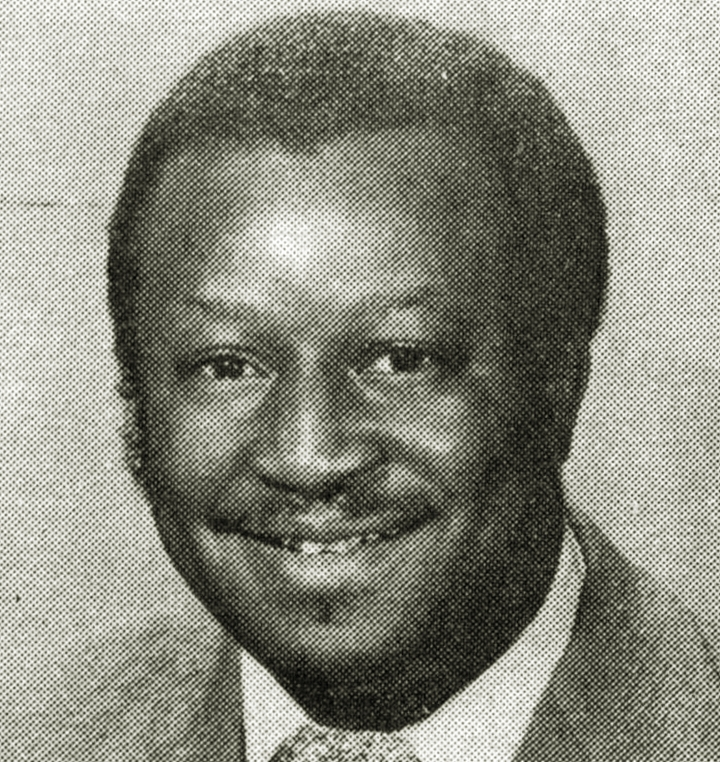

Member of the Alaska House of Representatives
- In office 1970–1972

Personal details
- Born: August 6, 1929 Georgetown, South Carolina, U.S.
- Died: November 2, 2017 (aged 88)
- Party: Democratic
- Education: Howard University (BS, DDS)

Joshua J. Wright II (August 6, 1929 – November 2, 2017) was a dentist and politician in the United States who served as a member of the Alaska House of Representatives between 1970 and 1972. Born in Georgetown, South Carolina on August 6, 1929, to Joshua and Louise Wright, he attended Howard University, where he studied zoology, chemistry, and later, dentistry. By 1956, Wright had moved to Mt. Edgecombe, Alaska, where he worked for the Public Health Service Hospital until 1958, when he moved to Anchorage.

Wright was a member of the Anchorage School Board between 1969 and 1972, and served a nearly concurrent term on the Alaska House of Representatives from 1970 to 1972. He retired from dentistry in 2013, and died on November 2, 2017, aged 88.
