= Mike Davis (Alaska politician) =

American politician (born 1946)

Member of the Alaska House of Representatives from the 19th district
- In office January 17, 1983 – January 21, 1991
- Preceded by: Redistricted
- Succeeded by: Tom Moyer

Personal details
- Born: August 15, 1946 (age 79) Massena, Iowa, U.S.
- Party: Democratic
- Education: Grossmont College; University of San Diego; University of Alaska Fairbanks
- Occupation: Commercial fisherman, politician, university teacher

Michael E. Davis (born August 15, 1946) is an American politician.

Davis was born in Massena, Iowa, on August 15, 1946. He was raised in California, where he attended University High School. Upon graduation in 1964, Davis enrolled at Grossmont College. He earned an associate degree in 1966, followed by a bachelor's degree in economics at the University of San Diego in 1968. In 1978, Davis completed a Master of Arts in Teaching at the University of Alaska Fairbanks. He was elected to four terms as a member of the Alaska House of Representatives from District 19, serving between 1982 and 1990, as a Democrat. Davis's tenure at the University of Alaska Fairbanks overlapped with his legislative service. He formally joined the UAF faculty in 1996, and continued teaching after he was granted emeritus status in 2014.
