= Margaret Branson =

American politician (1927-2005)

Member of the Alaska House of Representatives from the 5th district
- In office January 15, 1979 – January 12, 1981
- Preceded by: Peter Lovseth
- Succeeded by: Bette Cato

Personal details
- Born: May 12, 1927 Sheridan, Wyoming
- Died: November 29, 2005 (aged 78) Anchorage, Alaska
- Party: Republican
- Spouse: Ralph
- Education: University of Denver (BA); University of Oregon

Margaret Aber Branson (May 12, 1927 – November 29, 2005) was a member of the Alaska House of Representatives from January 1979 to January 1981. Before serving in the legislature, Branson was a member of the Kenai Peninsula Borough Assembly from 1977 to 1979. She was also a writer, photographer, and gallery owner. Her son Malcolm was a victim of Alaska Airlines Flight 261.
