= John Cowdery =

American politician

John J. Cowdery

Member of the Alaska Senate from the O (previously I) district
- In office January 2001 – January 2009
- Preceded by: Sean Parnell
- Succeeded by: Kevin Meyer

Member of the Alaska House of Representatives from the 17th district
- In office January 1997 – January 2001
- Preceded by: Sean Parnell
- Succeeded by: Lesil McGuire

Member of the Alaska House of Representatives from the 8th district
- In office January 1983 – January 1985 Serving with Sam Pestinger
- Preceded by: none - newly created district (redistricting)
- Succeeded by: Fritz Pettyjohn

Personal details
- Born: John Joe Cowdery; February 11, 1930 Near Adrian, Missouri, U.S.
- Died: July 13, 2013 (aged 83) Anchorage, Alaska, U.S.
- Party: Republican
- Spouse: Juanita
- Profession: Contractor

John Joe Cowdery (February 11, 1930 – July 13, 2013) was a Republican member of the Alaska Senate, representing the O District from 2001 through 2008. He was previously a member of the Alaska House of Representatives from 1982 through 1984, and from 1997 through 2000.

== Corruption ==
In 2008 Cowdery was indicted on charges of conspiracy and bribery for his actions in attempting to bribe another senator, Donny Olsen, to support a proposal, favored by executives in Alaska's oil industry, concerning oil leases and petroleum production taxes. Olson was the only Democratic legislator known to have been offered an illegal bribe, and the only officeholder who turned it down.

In 2009 Cowdery was sentenced to six months in home confinement and fined $25,000.

In January 2008, in poor health and under investigation, he indicated that he would decline to file for reelection.

== Personal life ==
Originally from Adrian, Missouri, he and his wife Juanita had one child. He died July 13, 2013, at the age of 83.

== See also ==
- Alaska political corruption probe
