= Jacob Laktonen =

Alaskan politician and accountant

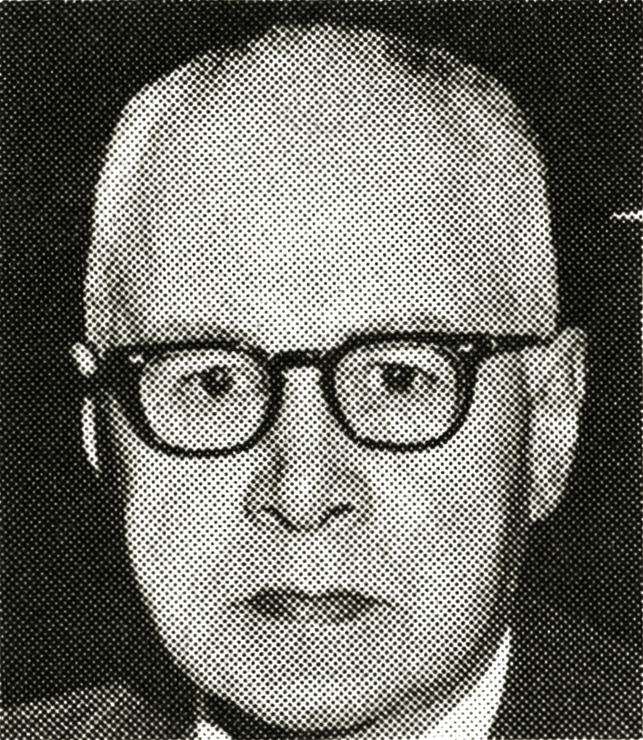

Member of the Alaska House of Representatives from the 13th District
- In office January 8, 1973 – January 20, 1975

Personal details
- Born: Jacob John Laktonen Jr. January 18, 1917 Karluk, Territory of Alaska
- Died: April 6, 1996 (aged 79) Tillamook, Oregon, U.S.
- Party: Republican

Jacob John Laktonen, Jr. (January 18, 1917 – April 6, 1996) was an American accountant and politician. Laktonen served a single term in the Alaska House of Representatives in the 1970s. He was employed for at least four decades by the Alaska Packers' Association and was an accountant for them at the time he served in the House. Laktonen was a Republican and a Native American, and his residence was Larsen Bay. A veteran and a commercial fishersman, Laktonen also founded and served on the Larsen Bay Village Council.
