= Gail Phillips =

American politician (1944–2021)

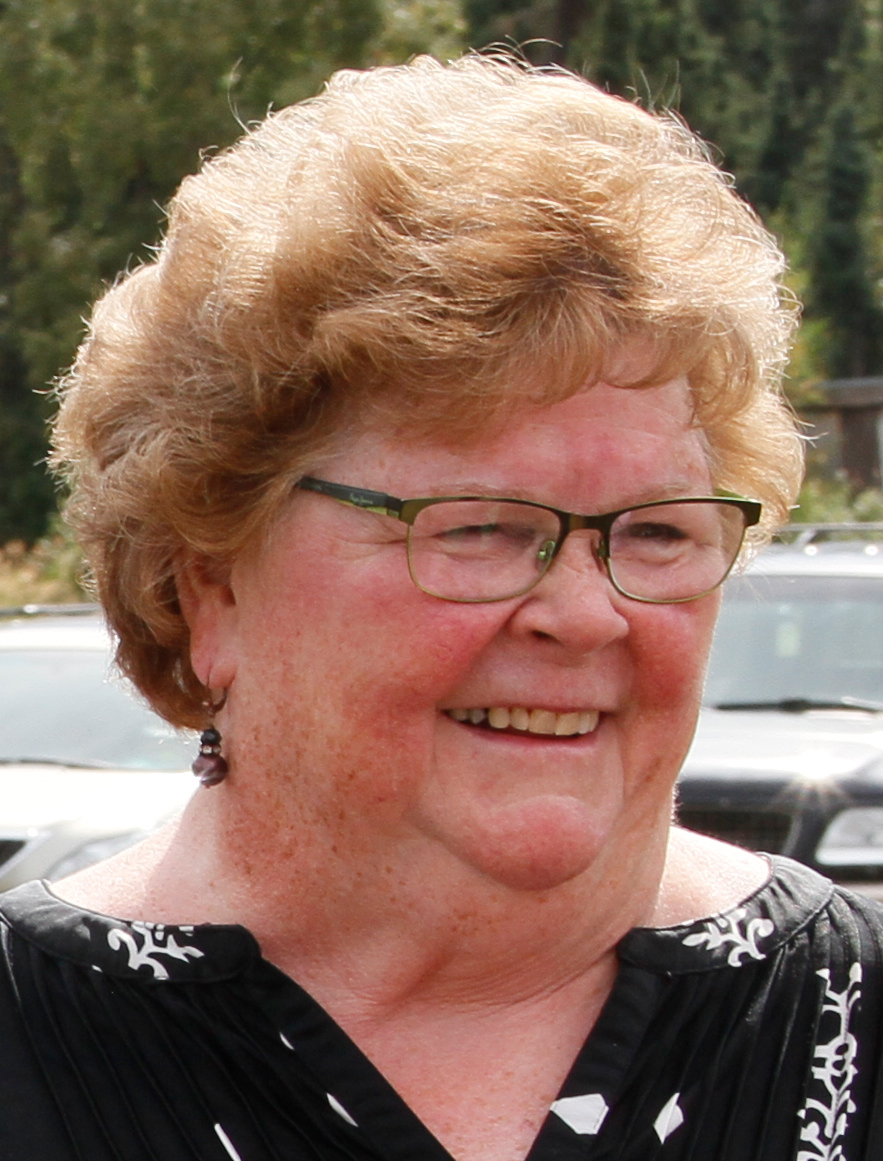

Speaker of the Alaska House of Representatives
- In office 1995–1999
- Preceded by: Brian Porter

Member of the Alaska House of Representatives from the 7th District
- In office 1991–2001

Personal details
- Born: Ramona Gail McIver; May 15, 1944 Juneau, Alaska, U.S.
- Died: March 25, 2021 (aged 76)
- Party: Republican
- Education: University of Alaska, Fairbanks
- Occupation: politician

Ramona Gail Phillips (née McIver; May 15, 1944 – March 25, 2021) was the 17th Speaker of the Alaska House of Representatives.

== Early life and career ==
Born in Juneau, Alaska, Phillips graduated from Nome High School, in Nome, Alaska, in 1962. She then received her bachelor's degree in business education from University of Alaska Fairbanks. Phillips was involved in the mining industry. She also owned Quiet Sports Store and managed Wein Air Alaska, Phillips taught business education in Nome, Alaska from 1967 to 1969.

== Political career ==
Phillips served on the Homer, Alaska City Council from 1981 to 1984. From 1984 to 1986, Phillips served on the Kenai Peninsula Borough Assembly and was involved with the Republican Party.

Phillips served in the Alaska House of Representatives from 1991 to 2001 and was speaker of the house from 1995 to 1999.

In 2002, Phillips ran for the election for Lieutenant Governor of Alaska and lost the election.

== Death ==
Phillips died on March 25, 2021, after a long battle with cancer.

== See also ==
- List of female speakers of legislatures in the United States
