= Ramona Barnes =

American politician

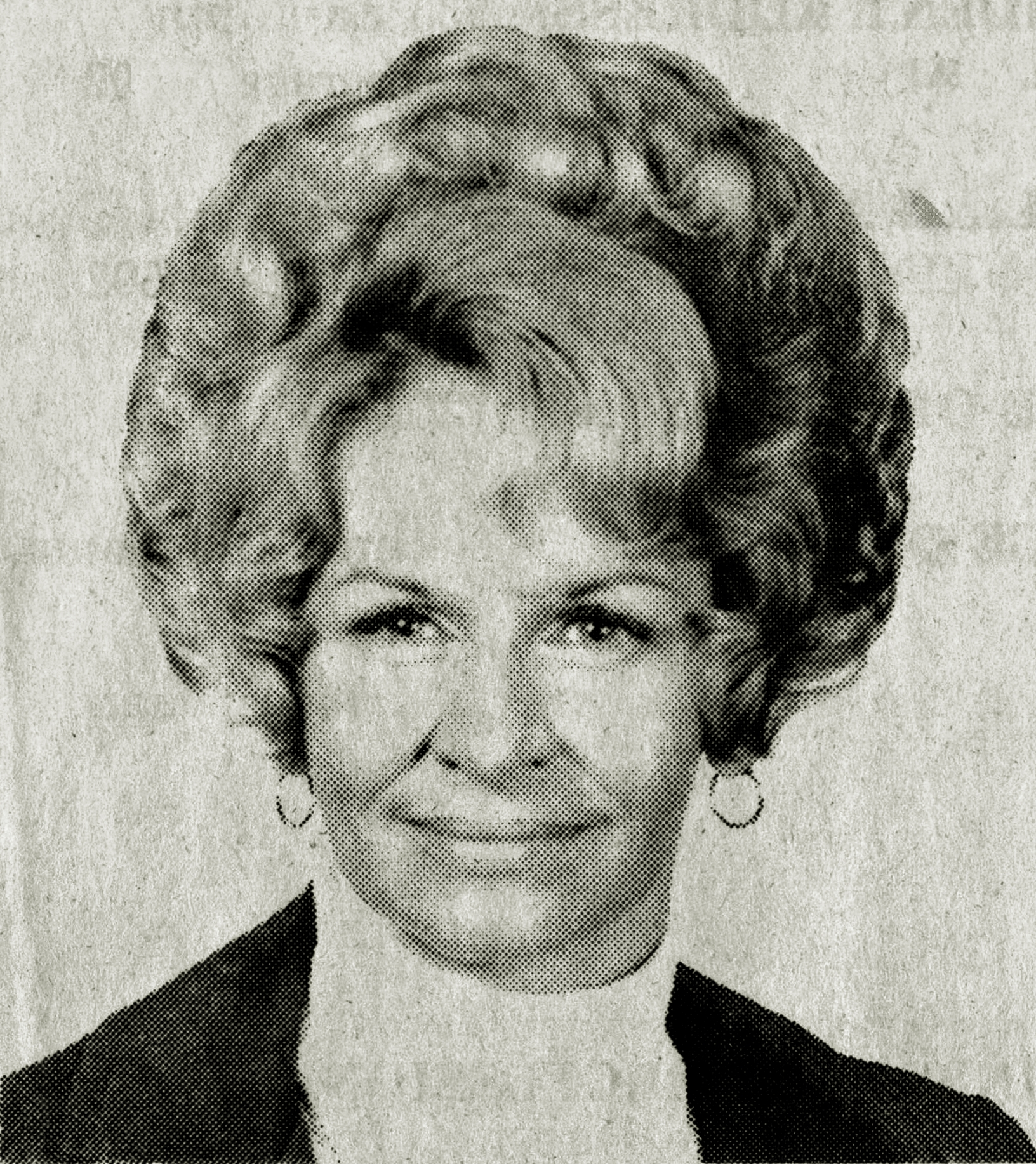

Member of the Alaska House of Representatives from the 14th district (10th district 1979–1983)
- In office January 15, 1979 – January 14, 1985 Serving with C. V. Chatterton (1979–1981), Charles G. Anderson (1981–1983), Walt Furnace (1983–1985)
- Preceded by: Rick Urion
- Succeeded by: Marco Pignalberi

Member of the Alaska House of Representatives from the 22nd district (14th district 1987–1993)
- In office January 19, 1987 – January 8, 2001 Serving with Walt Furnace (1987–1991), Bettye Davis (1991–1993)
- Preceded by: Marco Pignalberi
- Succeeded by: Harry Crawford

Personal details
- Born: Ramona Lee Etta Wheeler; July 7, 1938 Pikeville, Tennessee, US
- Died: November 26, 2003 (aged 65) Anchorage, Alaska, US
- Party: Republican

Ramona Lee Etta Barnes (née Wheeler; July 7, 1938 – November 26, 2003) was a Republican politician in the state of Alaska. She served in the Alaska House of Representatives for two periods spanning 1979 and 1985 and 1987 and 2001. She was the first female Speaker of the House in Alaska.

== Early life ==
Barnes was born on July 7, 1938, in Pikeville, Tennessee. Her father was Ellison Wheeler, a lawyer. She attended Bledsoe County High School in Tennessee and Waipahu Community College in Hawaii before graduating from Michigan State University. She married Larry Barnes in 1960, who was in the military, and the couple had three children: Randall, Michael and Michelle. The couple later divorced. She served as an undercover agent for the Central Intelligence Agency in the Philippines.

The family moved to Anchorage, Alaska. She managed a beauty shop and salon, was president of the Arctic Research Consultants, Inc, and served on the school board of the Elmendorf Air Force Base between 1973 and 1976 before getting involved in politics. Barnes was a delegate to the 1976 and 1978 Republican state conventions and was a member of the precinct committee. She was also a director of the Anchorage Community Mental Health Center and the Alaska Blood Bank.

== Political career ==
Barnes was first elected to the Alaska House of Representatives in 1978. She lost re-election to Marco Pignalberi in 1984 but she was re-elected in the 1986 general election. She was the first woman in the state to hold every leadership position in the House, serving as majority leader in 1983, chair of the judiciary and legislative ethics committees and minority whip in 1991 and minority leader in 1992. When the Republicans took control of the House in 1993, she became the Speaker of the House. She was the first female Speaker of the House in Alaska.

She was known for her tough stance, evidenced by the President of the Alaska Senate gifting her a set of brass balls. On the House floor, she offended the state of Wyoming by calling Cheyenne "the pits of the earth." She was named an outstanding legislator of the year. Barnes was a social conservative who was focused on developing oil and gas in the state. She was a member of the Anchorage Republican Women's Club, the National Federation of Republican Women, the Navy League and the National Rifle Association of America. She was a member of the Alaskan delegation at the 2000 Republican National Convention.

== Death ==
Barnes died on November 26, 2003, at the Providence Alaska Medical Center in Anchorage, from pneumonia caused by cancer. Her papers are held by the University of Alaska Anchorage.

== See also ==
- List of female speakers of legislatures in the United States
