= Don Gilman =

American politician

Donald Gilman

Member of the Alaska Senate
- In office January 12, 1981 – January 14, 1985
- Preceded by: Clem Tillion
- Succeeded by: Redistricted

Personal details
- Born: April 20, 1934 Long Creek, Oregon
- Died: July 18, 2005 (aged 71) Sun City West, Arizona
- Party: Republican

Donald Eugene Gilman (April 20, 1934 – July 18, 2005) was an American politician. He served as a Republican member of the Alaska Senate from 1980 to 1984.

Gilman served in the United States Army and was a reservist.

While serving as mayor of Kenai, Alaska, in 1980, Gilman was elected to a seat in the state senate vacated by the retirement of Senate President Clem Tillion. In April 1984, Gilman stated that he did not intend to run for reelection to the seat. In December 1984, the Alaska Environmental Lobby scored the departing Gilman as tied with two other members (one Republican and one Democrat) as the lowest-rated member of the state senate on their evaluation of environmental issues.

Gilman again ran for mayor of Kenai in 1987, and was "considered the heavy favorite" in the race. After winning that contest, he was also appointed to the Pacific Northwest Hazardous Waste Advisory Council by Alaska Governor Steve Cowper. As mayor, in 1992 he traveled to Sakhalin Island in the Russian Far East to meet with Russian officials and compare efforts to develop oil and gas reserves with those in Alaska. In 1996, still serving as mayor, he expressed concern with opposition by Governor Tony Knowles to federal plans to allow offshore oil and gas drilling in Cook Inlet.
