= Joe D. Montgomery =

American politician (1918–2013)

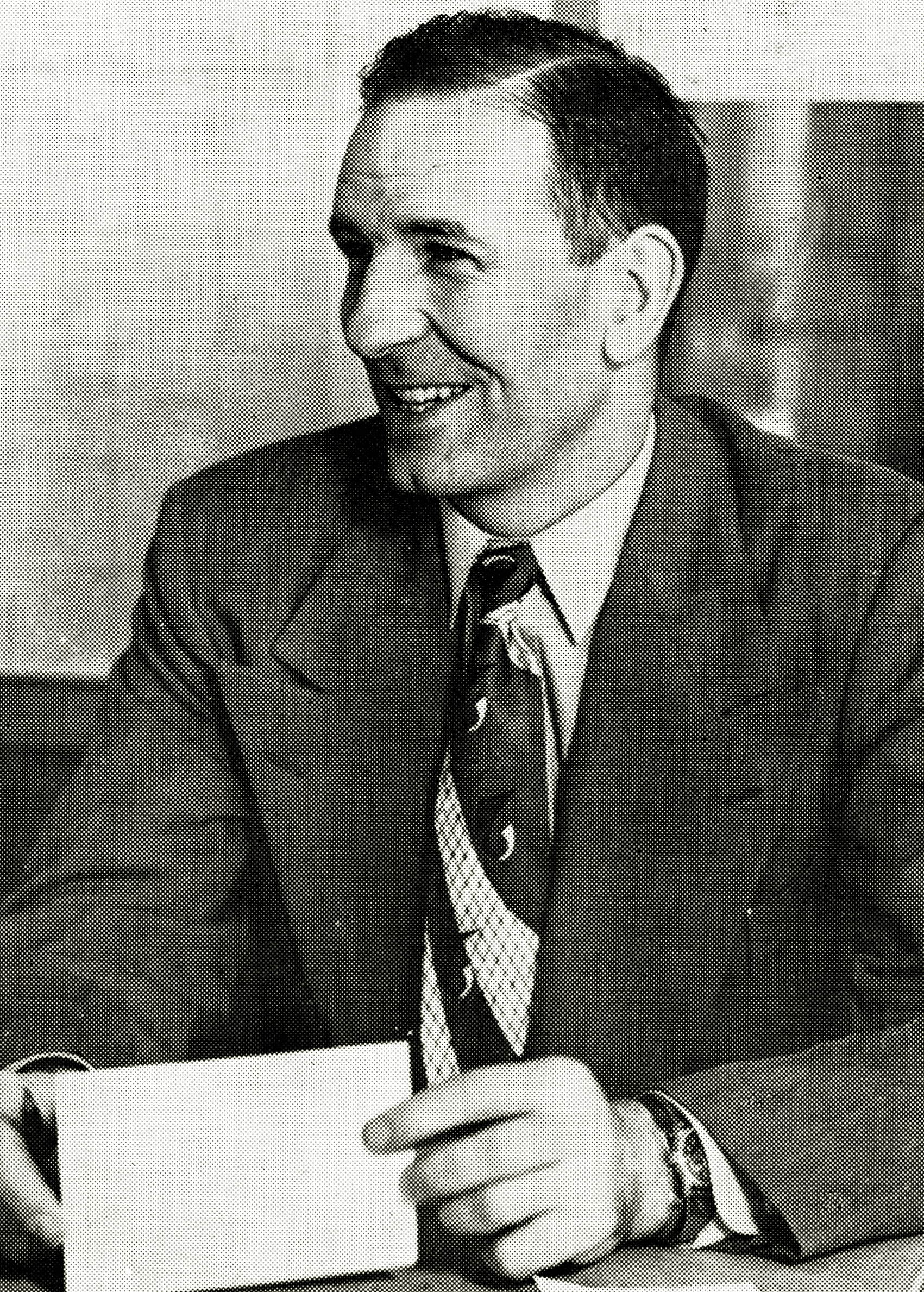

Joe D. Montgomery (January 28, 1918 – October 5, 2013) was an American politician, educator, and businessman.

Born in Floydada, Texas, he served in the United States Army Air Forces during World War II. He graduated from Colorado State University. Montgomery went to San Francisco, California and then moved to Anchorage, Alaska where he was an educator, principal, and superintendent of the Anchorage Public Schools. He also owned an automobile agency. He served two terms as a Republican in the Alaska House of Representatives from 1979 to 1983. He died in Anchorage, Alaska.
