= Marco Pignalberi =

American politician

Marco Anthony Pignalberi II (March 24, 1944 – December 10, 2002) was an American politician.

Born in Syracuse, New York, Pignalberi served in the United States Air Force. He studied at the American University, the University of Alaska Fairbanks, and the Alaska Pacific University. Pignalberi settled in Anchorage, Alaska and worked for the Alaska Department of Transportation. Pignalberi was involved with the Republican Party and worked for the Alaska Legislature. From 1985 to 1987, Pignalberi served in the Alaska House of Representatives. His name was removed from the 1986 Alaska General Election ballot when he failed to disclose a loan he had received from a lobbyist who was involved in a corruption probe in North Slope Borough, Alaska. In 2000, Pignalberi campaigned for the Republican nomination for the Alaska Senate and failed to receive the nomination. Pignalberi served as borough manager for Haines Borough, Alaska from 2001 until his death in 2002. Pignalberi died from a heart attack in Haines, Alaska.
