= Paul Fischer (politician) =

American politician

Member of the Alaska Senate
- In office 1983–1992

Personal details
- Born: March 23, 1936 Columbia, Pennsylvania, U.S.
- Died: May 8, 2021 (aged 85)
- Party: Republican

Paul Fischer (March 23, 1936 – May 8, 2021) was an American politician. He served as a Republican member of the Alaska Senate.

== Life and career ==
Fischer was born in Columbia, Pennsylvania.

Fischer served in the Alaska Senate from 1983 to 1992.

Fischer died on May 8, 2021, at the age of 85.
