= Brian D. Rogers =

American politician

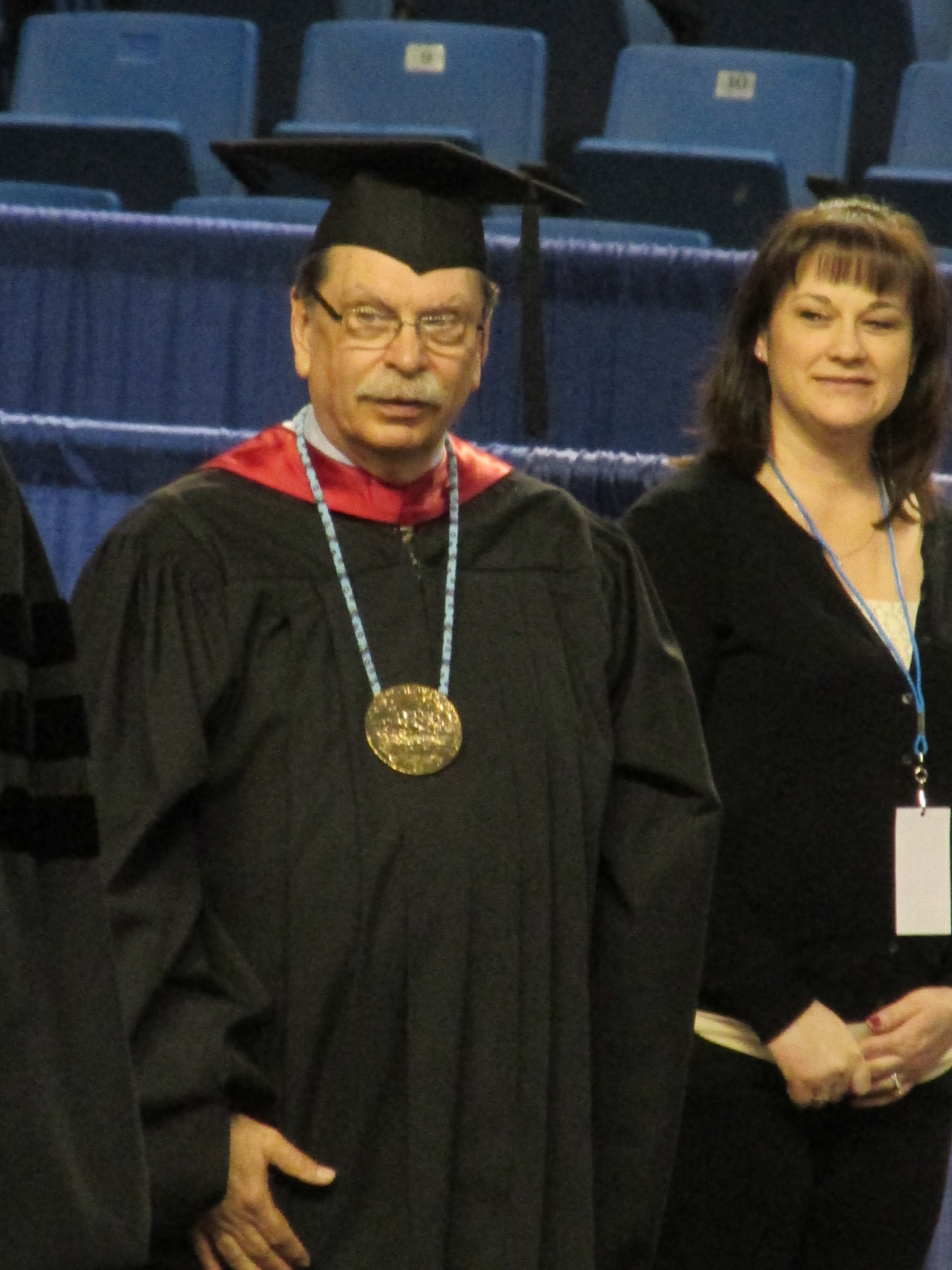
- Rogers (left) in May 2014, presiding over UAF's commencement ceremony

6th Chancellor of the University of Alaska Fairbanks
- In office May 2009 – September 2015
- Preceded by: Stephen B. Jones
- Succeeded by: Michael K. Powers

Member of the Alaska House of Representatives
- In office 1979–1983

Personal details
- Born: Brian Douglas Rogers; July 25, 1950 (age 76) Blue Hill, Maine, U.S.
- Spouse: Sherry Modrow
- Children: 2
- Education: Trinity College; Brown University; Harvard University
- Profession: Politician, businessman, academic administrator

Brian Douglas Rogers (born July 25, 1950, in Blue Hill, Maine) was the 6th chancellor of the University of Alaska Fairbanks from 2009 to 2015.

== Life ==
He graduated from Harvard University’s John F. Kennedy School of Government, with a master's degree in public administration. He was a free-lance journalist, a legislative aide, a member of the Alaska House of Representatives from 1979 to 1983, a vice president of finance for the University of Alaska statewide system and a partner and chief financial officer in the consulting firm Information Insights, from 1996 to 2008. He chaired the State of Alaska Long-Range Planning Commission from 1995 to 1996. He was appointed to the Alaska Natural Gas Development Authority, by Governor Sarah Palin. He is a director of Alaska Communications Systems Group.

== University of Alaska Fairbanks ==
University of Alaska President Mark Hamilton named Brian Rogers permanent chancellor of UAF in May 2009. Rogers had served as interim chancellor since July 2008. A former UAF student, he attended Trinity College and Brown University before receiving his master's degree in public administration from Harvard. Rogers is married to UAF alumna Sherry Modrow. They have two grown sons, both UAF graduates. Rogers is a member of numerous community organizations, including the Greater Fairbanks Chamber of Commerce, the Fairbanks Downtown Rotary. Rogers announced in April 2015 his intention to step down from the position in September 2015.
