= Fritz Pettyjohn =

American businessman and politician

Member of the Alaska House of Representatives from the 8-A district
- In office 1985–1991
- Preceded by: John Cowdery
- Succeeded by: Betty Bruckman

Member of the Alaska Senate from the E-A district
- In office 1983–1985
- Preceded by: Victor Fischer
- Succeeded by: Jay Kerttula

Personal details
- Born: September 20, 1945 (age 81) Berkeley, California, U.S.
- Party: Republican
- Spouse: Babbie
- Children: 3
- Education: University of California, Berkeley (BA); University of California, Los Angeles (JD)

Fritz Pettyjohn (born September 20, 1945) is a Republican politician in the U.S. state of Alaska. He was born in Berkeley, California in 1945. He received a BA in Political Science from UC Berkeley in 1967 and a JD from UCLA in 1974. He served in the Naval Reserve Officer Training Corps as a Midshipman from 1962 to 1963. He was elected to the Alaska Senate in 1982 and served for one term. He was elected to the Alaska House of Representatives in 1984 and was reelected in 1986 and 1988. After leaving the legislature, he wrote biweekly political columns for the Anchorage Daily News. In 2001, he moved back to California. He has been married to his wife for 48 years and he has three sons and five grandchildren.

Alaska Senate
Preceded by Victor Fischer	Member of the Alaska Senate from E-A district 1983–1985	Succeeded by Jay Kerttula
Alaska House of Representatives
Preceded by John Cowdery	Member of the Alaska House of Representatives from the 8-A district 1985–1991	Succeeded by Betty Bruckman
