= Randy Phillips (politician) =

American politician

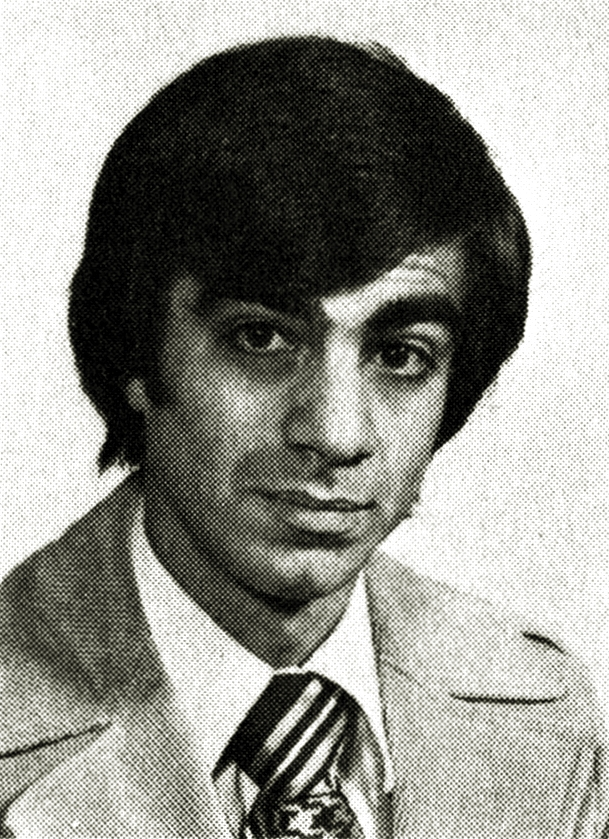
Randy Phillips during his first term in the Alaska House of Representatives.

Randell Ernest "Randy" Phillips (born August 30, 1950) is a retired politician from the U.S. state of Alaska. Phillips served for twenty-six years as a Republican member of the Alaska House of Representatives and the Alaska Senate, from 1977 to 2003.

Phillips was born in Seattle, Washington, on August 30, 1950. He came to Alaska with his family in 1956. He received a B.A. from Alaska Methodist University in 1973. He established residency in Eagle River, along the Glenn Highway north of Anchorage. He worked as a legislative aide in the 9th Alaska State Legislature before running for the House himself in 1976. He was elected to the four-member 8th District, which stretched from the Anchorage neighborhoods Mountain View and Muldoon, out the Glenn Highway to Eagle River, Chugiak and Eklutna.

In his first term in the 10th Alaska State Legislature, Phillips was named Outstanding Freshman Legislator. In his second term, he was the second-youngest member of the House by only one day, being born the day after Ray Metcalfe. He served in the House until 1993; following redistricting during the 1980s, he represented the two-member 15th District, which pared his constituency down to the Chugiak and Eagle River areas.

His tenure in the Alaska Senate lasted from 1993 to 2003. He said his decision to retire from the legislature was prompted by redistricting that drastically altered his district. The redistricting in question placed Phillips in District P, which reached from the eastern and southern portions of Eagle River to northeast and south Anchorage, Whittier and the northeastern Kenai Peninsula, mostly connecting through Chugach State Park. Phillips would have had to run against south Anchorage representative Con Bunde (who did win the seat and served until his retirement in 2011) in a district largely removed from his traditional constituency.

From 1987 to 1991, Phillips was tied with fellow 15th District representative Sam Cotten as the senior member of the House. Cotten was elected to the Senate in 1990, which left Phillips as the senior member in his final term. Following the 1994 reelection defeat of Jalmar M. Kerttula, Phillips was tied with Tim Kelly from 1995 to 2001 as the senior member of the legislature. Kelly was also first elected to the House from the 8th District in 1976. Kelly's retirement left Phillips as the senior member of the legislature in his final two years in office. In the overall history of the Alaska Legislature, Phillips is the third-longest-serving member; if the territorial legislature is excluded, Phillips is second behind Kerttula. At the conclusion of the 27th Alaska State Legislature, his length of service will be tied by both Johnny Ellis and Lyman Hoffman; the former was the same age as Phillips when he was first elected to the legislature.

His papers are held at the Consortium Library of the University of Alaska Anchorage and Alaska Pacific University, the latter the lineal descendant of his alma mater AMU.

== Sources ==
- State of Alaska Division of Elections: Senate District L, Randy Phillips, Republican, accessed December 29, 2011
- UAA/APU Consortium Library: Guide to the Randy Phillips papers, 1977-2003, accessed December 29, 2011
