= Walt Furnace =

American politician

Walter Ray Furnace (born December 31, 1943) is an American politician and businessman.

== Background ==
Furnace was born in Ennis, Texas and graduated from the George Carter High School. He served in the United States Air Force. He settled in Anchorage, Alaska and received his bachelor's in business administration from University of Alaska Anchorage in 1972. He also went to the Gambell Street Business School and the Western CUNA Management School. Furnace was involved in the banking business in Anchorage. Furnace served on the Anchorage School Board and was president of the school board. He was a Republican. Furnace served in the Alaska House of Representatives from 1982 to 1990.
