= Glenn Hackney =

American politician (1924–2022)

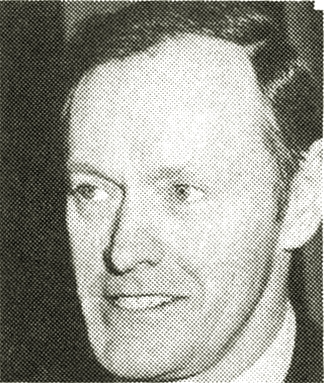

Glenn Hackney (December 22, 1924 – May 20, 2022) was an American politician. He was a member of the Alaska House of Representatives from 1973 to 1977 and the Alaska Senate from 1977 to 1981. He died after a traffic collision, on May 20, 2022, at the age of 97.
