= Willard L. Bowman =

American politician (1919–1975)

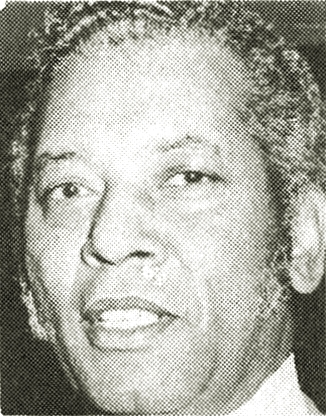
- Bowman in 1973

Member of the Alaska House of Representatives
- In office 1970–1975

Personal details
- Born: 18 August 1919 Grand Rapids, Michigan, U.S.
- Died: 3 December 1975 (aged 56) Anchorage, Alaska, U.S.
- Party: Democratic
- Occupation: Politician

Military service
- Allegiance: United States
- Branch/service: United States Navy
- Years of service: 1938–1945
- Battles/wars: World War II

Willard Leon Bowman (August 18, 1919 – December 3, 1975) was an American politician.

Bowman was a native of Grand Rapids, Michigan. He served in the United States Navy from 1938 to 1945. Five years later, he moved to Anchorage, Alaska. William A. Egan named Bowman the inaugural director of the Alaska Human Rights Commission 9(F.J.B)0 in 1963. Bowman led the commission until 1970, when he was first elected to the Alaska House of Representatives as a Democrat. Bowman won reelection twice afterwards, in 1972 and 1974. He died of cancer on December 3, 1975, aged 56.
