= Bob Mulcahy =

American politician (1929–2005)

Member of the Alaska Senate
- In office 1979–1984

Personal details
- Born: Vincent Robert Mulcahy; August 14, 1929 Winnebago, Minnesota, U.S.
- Died: January 9, 2005 (aged 75) Anchorage, Alaska, U.S.
- Party: Republican

Vincent Robert Mulcahy (August 14, 1929 – January 9, 2005) was an American politician. A member of the Republican Party, he served in the Alaska Senate from 1979 to 1984.

== Life and career ==
Mulcahy was born in Winnebago, Minnesota, the son of Vincent Mulcahy and Mary Campion. He attended Faibault High School, graduating in 1947. After graduating, he served in the United States Navy, which after his discharge, he worked as a banker.

Mulcahy served in the Alaska Senate from 1979 to 1984.

== Death ==
Mulcahy died on January 9, 2005, at the Providence Alaska Medical Center in Anchorage, Alaska, at the age of 75.
