= Bob Bettisworth =

American businessman and politician

Personal details
- Born: August 23, 1926 Coffeyville, Kansas, U.S.
- Died: February 13, 2015 (aged 88) Mesa, Arizona, U.S.

Robert H. Bettisworth (August 23, 1926 – February 13, 2015) was an American businessman and politician.

Born in Coffeyville, Kansas, Bettisworth went to Fairbanks, Alaska Territory, in 1948, to look for gold. Later he started a masonry business and was also in the grocery and real estate businesses. From 1965 to 1976, Bettisworth served in the Fairbanks-North Star Borough Assembly and was presiding officer of the borough assembly. From 1979 to 1985, Bettisworth served in the Alaska House of Representatives. He died in Mesa, Arizona.
