= Terry Martin (Alaska politician) =

American politician (born 1936)

Member of the Alaska House of Representatives from the 14th district
- In office January 11, 1993 – January 19, 1999
- Preceded by: District created
- Succeeded by: Lisa Murkowski

Member of the Alaska House of Representatives from district 13B
- In office January 18, 1983 – January 11, 1993
- Preceded by: District created
- Succeeded by: District abolished

Member of the Alaska House of Representatives from the 8th district
- In office January 16, 1979 – January 18, 1983
- Preceded by: Bob Bradley
- Succeeded by: District abolished

Personal details
- Born: January 17, 1936 (age 90) Baltimore, Maryland, U.S.
- Party: Republican

Terrence H. Martin (born January 17, 1936) is an American politician who served in the Alaska House of Representatives from 1979 to 1999.
