= Clem Tillion =

American politician (1925–2021)

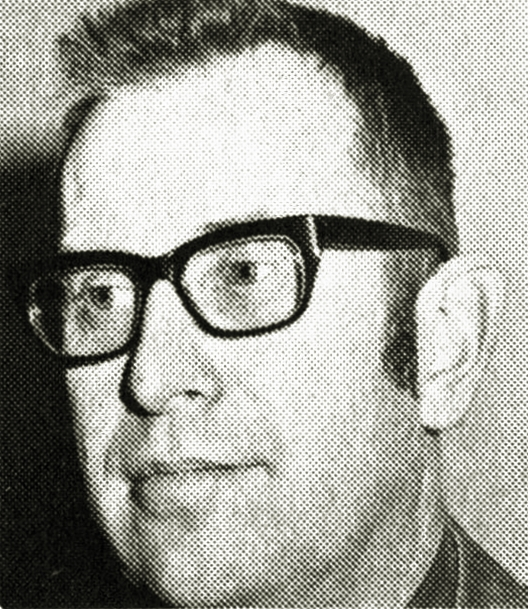

President of the Alaska Senate
- In office January 15, 1979 – January 12, 1981
- Preceded by: John Rader
- Succeeded by: Jay Kerttula

Member of the Alaska Senate from the K district
- In office January 20, 1975 – January 12, 1981
- Preceded by: W. I. "Bob" Palmer
- Succeeded by: Don Gilman

Member of the Alaska House of Representatives from the 10th district (11th district 1973–1975)
- In office January 28, 1963 – January 20, 1975
- Preceded by: (as the 12th district); Leo Rhode
- Succeeded by: Leo Rhode

Personal details
- Born: July 3, 1925 Brooklyn, New York, U.S.
- Died: October 13, 2021 (aged 96) Halibut Cove, Alaska, U.S.
- Party: Republican
- Spouse: Diana Rutzebeck (m. 1952; died 2010)
- Relatives: Sam Cotten (son-in-law)

Clement Vincent Tillion Jr. (July 3, 1925 – October 13, 2021) was an American politician. He was a member of the Alaska House of Representatives from 1963 to 1975 and the Senate from 1975 to 1981. He was the Senate president from 1979 to 1981. He served in the United States Navy during World War Two as a Seabee.
