= Sam Cotten =

American politician (born 1947)

Samuel Richard Cotten
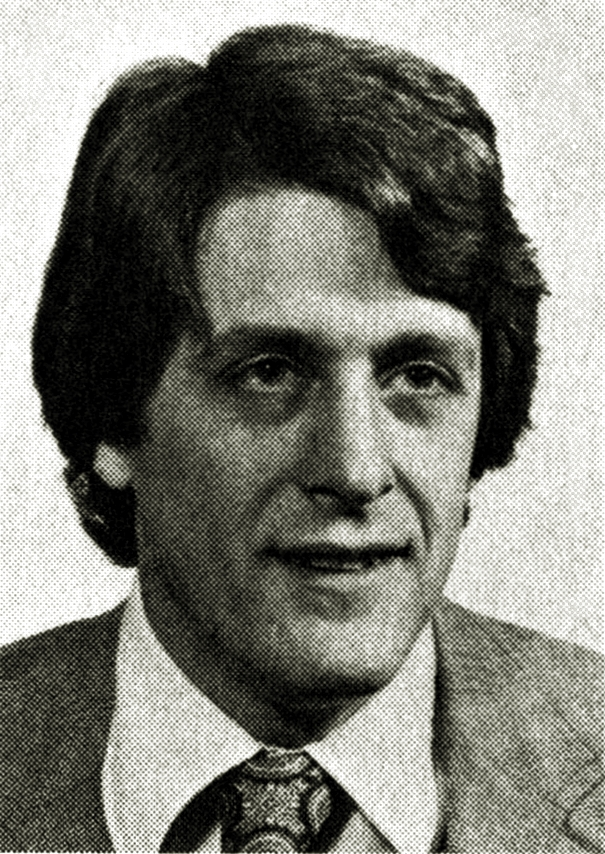

Commissioner of the Alaska Department of Fish and Game
- In office January 2015 – 2018
- Governor: Bill Walker

Speaker of the Alaska House of Representatives
- In office 1989–1990

Member of the Alaska Senate
- In office 1991–1992

Member of the Alaska House of Representatives
- In office 1985–1990
- In office 1975–1982

Personal details
- Born: July 16, 1947 (age 79) Anchorage, Alaska, U.S.
- Party: Democratic

Samuel Richard Cotten (born July 16, 1947) is an American former politician and fisheries official from Alaska. A member of the Democratic Party, he served in the Alaska Legislature for sixteen years, including as Speaker of the Alaska House of Representatives, and later served as commissioner of the Alaska Department of Fish and Game.

== Career ==
Cotten represented the Anchorage area in the Alaska House of Representatives from 1975 to 1982 and again from 1985 to 1990. He served as speaker of the House during the 1989–1990 legislature before serving in the Alaska Senate from 1991 to 1992. In 1994, he sought the Democratic nomination for Governor of Alaska, competing in the primary against Tony Knowles and former lieutenant governor Stephen McAlpine.

After leaving the legislature, Cotten became involved in fisheries policy. He worked as a fisheries analyst for the Aleutians East Borough and served two terms, from 2007 to 2013, on the North Pacific Fishery Management Council.

Governor Bill Walker named Cotten acting commissioner of the Alaska Department of Fish and Game in December 2014, and he was subsequently appointed commissioner in January 2015. As commissioner, he also represented the department on the North Pacific Fishery Management Council and participated in decisions concerning salmon bycatch and federal fisheries management. In 2016, the department under Cotten challenged a federal closure of caribou hunting in parts of Northwest Alaska to non-local hunters. He remained commissioner through 2018.
