= John Sackett =

American politician (1944–2021)

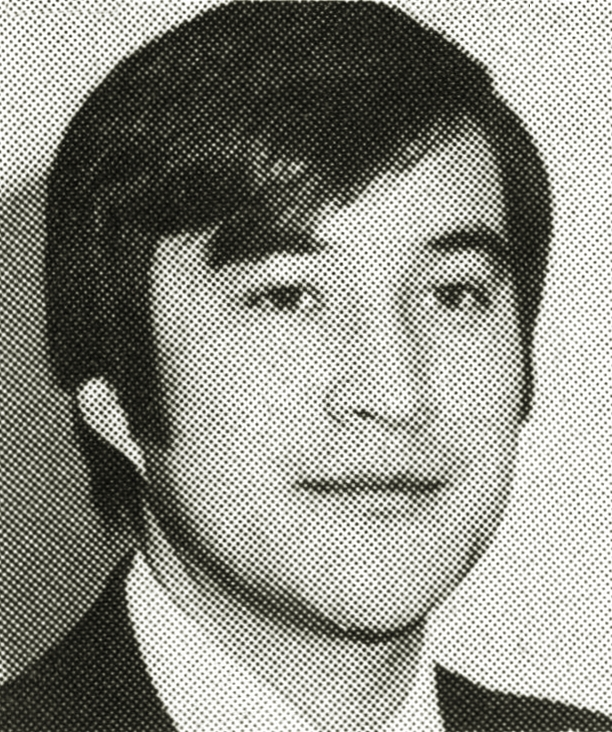

Member of the Alaska Senate from the M district
- In office January 18, 1983 – January 20, 1987
- Preceded by: Nels Anderson Jr.
- Succeeded by: John Binkley

Member of the Alaska Senate from the N district
- In office January 21, 1975 – January 18, 1983
- Succeeded by: Bob Mulcahy

Member of the Alaska Senate from the I district
- In office January 8, 1973 – January 21, 1975
- Preceded by: Don Young; John Butrovich
- Succeeded by: Mike Colletta

Member of the Alaska House of Representatives from the 15th district
- In office January 17, 1967 – January 19, 1971
- Preceded by: Norbert H. Skinner
- Succeeded by: Red Swanson

Personal details
- Born: June 3, 1944 Huslia, Territory of Alaska
- Died: March 3, 2021 (aged 76)
- Party: Republican

John C. Sackett (June 3, 1944 – March 3, 2021) was an Alaskan Native politician and businessman. A member of the Republican Party, he served in the Alaska House of Representatives from 1967 to 1970 and the Alaska Senate from 1973 to 1986. He served as president of the Tanana Chiefs Conference, was the founding president and chairman of Doyon, Limited and chaired the board of the Alaska Federation of Natives. As state senator, he served on the Senate Finance Committee and advocated for infrastructure and public services in rural Alaska.

== Early Life and education ==
Sackett was born on June 3rd, 1944, at a spring camp located at Old Woman's Slough on the Huslia River in the interior of Alaska. His family was from Cutoff, a Koyukon village on the Koyukuk River. During his childhood his family followed a migratory subsistence lifestyle. At the age of 4 Sackett listened to a man in his village scream for 3 days before dying, this would later influence his advocacy for basic medical and public services in isolated communities. In 1949 residents of Cutoff relocated to the place that later became Huslia.

At age 6 Sackett was sent to attend St. Mark's Mission School in Nenana, a year later in 1951 a school was built in Huslia allowing him to return home for his education. However, the school only went up to the 8th grade, so he had to continue his studies elsewhere.

Sackett applied to Mt. Edgecumbe High School in Sitka but was placed on the waiting list. However, due to help from a woman named Lois Morrie he was admitted to Sheldon Jackson School, a boarding school in Sitka. He graduated as valedictorian in 1963. Sackett described his experience at Sheldon Jackson as a important turning point in his life.

After graduating from high school Sackett attended Ohio University for a year. He subsequently transferred to the University of Alaska Fairbanks in 1965. While there he became involved with the Tanana Chiefs Conference and was elected president in 1966.

Sackett would eventually reenroll with the University of Alaska in 1969 to complete his degree. He graduated in 1972 with a degree in Business Administration, specializing in accounting, and a minor in Political Science.
