= Fred Zharoff =

American educator and politician

Fred F. Zharoff (October 9, 1944 – February 6, 2001) was an American educator and politician.

Zharoff was born in Kodiak, Alaska and graduated from Kodiak High School in 1963. He served in the Alaska Army National Guard and worked in commercial fishing. Zharoff graduated from University of Alaska Fairbanks in 1971 and taught at Kodiak High School in Kodiak. Zharoff served in the Alaska House of Representatives from 1979 to 1984 and in the Alaska Senate from 1985 to 1996. He was a Democrat. He died at his home in Kodiak, Alaska.
