= Joe L. Hayes =

American civil engineer, lobbyist, politician, and surveyor (1930–2018)

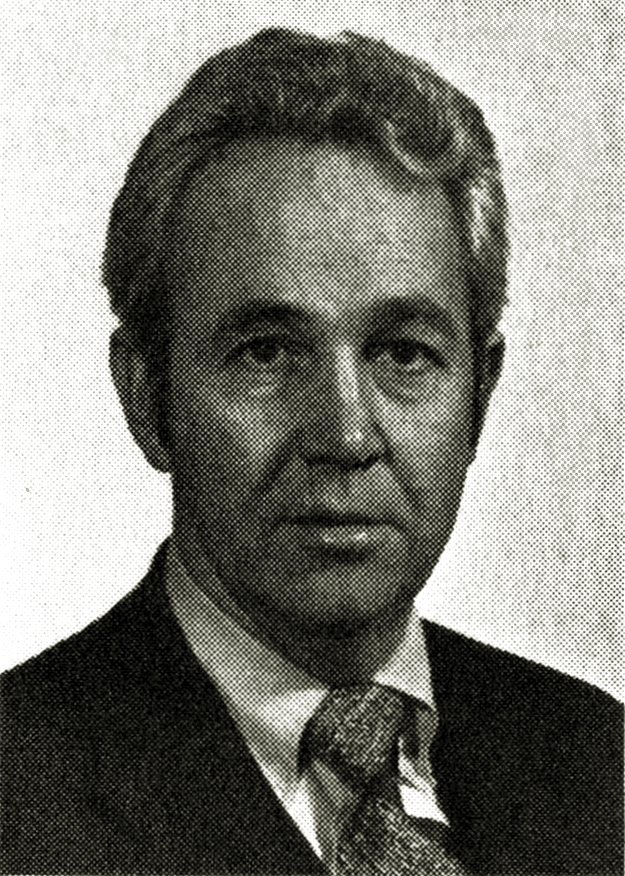
Joe L. Hayes in 1977

Joseph Lynn Hayes (February 18, 1930 – February 16, 2018) was an American civil engineer, lobbyist, politician and surveyor.

Joe Hayes was born in Bakersfield, Missouri to Norman "Darby" and Dicy Hayes. His uncle, Herman Cotter, worked throughout the Territory of Alaska during World War II and convinced the Hayes family to accompany him and his family in their move to Alaska. Making the trip in June 1946, they were among the first civilians to travel the Alaska Highway. The Hayes family settled in Anchorage, where he graduated from Anchorage High School the following year.

Hayes received his bachelor's degree in civil engineering from the University of Washington in 1951, and his master's degree from the University of Alaska in 1966. Hayes was a surveyor and civil engineer. He was a partner in the engineering firm Tryck, Nyman and Hayes in Anchorage, which has been one of Alaska's leading engineering firms since the late 20th century. Hayes served as chair of the Anchorage Platting Commission from 1959 to 1964. From 1977 to 1984, Hayes served in the Alaska House of Representatives as a Republican representing west Anchorage. In 1981 and 1983, Hayes served as speaker of the house, gaining the office as a result of a leadership coup in which dissident Democrats formed a coalition with members of all three parties (which included two Libertarians), deposing the Democratic House leadership and incumbent speaker Jim Duncan.

Hayes ran unsuccessfully for Mayor of Anchorage in 1981. He ran for governor in the 1986 primary election. He spent nearly a million dollars of his own money but fared little well in the crowded field, gaining 5.3 percent of the vote among fourteen candidates in the blanket primary and coming in a distant fourth among Republicans, behind Arliss Sturgulewski, Wally Hickel and Dick Randolph.

After leaving elected office, Hayes became a lobbyist. At the turn of the 21st century, he was Alaska's top legislative lobbyist, earning nearly ten percent of the total revenue spent on lobbying in Alaska by himself. After retiring, he bought an estate in Missouri and returned there to live. He reunited with his cousin in June 2016 in Anchorage to recall his trip up the Alaska Highway; the two were the only surviving members of that party at the time.

A Lutheran, Hayes married Patricia and they had three daughters. Hayes died at age 87 on February 16, 2018 in Anchorage.
