= Terry Gardiner =

American politician (b. 1950)

Terry Lewis Gardiner in 2013

Terry Gardiner (born August 12, 1950) is an American former politician, who served as the Speaker of the House of the Alaska House of Representatives.

== Early life and education ==
Gardiner was born on August 12, 1950, in Ketchikan, Alaska. His parents, Herb and Helen Gardiner, moved to Ketchikan in 1947. Herb worked at Fidalgo Island Packing, later a part of Trident Seafoods, and later at a pulp mill. Helen was a homemaker.

Gardiner graduated from Ketchikan High School in 1968 and studied political science and history at Western Washington State College in Bellingham.

== Career ==
Gardiner's early employment was as a deckhand, starting in 1966 on the troller Pam. In 1967–68, he worked as a gillnet deckhand for Dick Bishop. He took over the gillnetter Veto in 1969 and purchased his vessel, Connie Anne, in 1971, which he operated until 1981.

His political career began with a legislative internship in Olympia in 1971 for Representative Gladys Kirk.

In 1972, Gardiner worked in the Alaska Legislature for Representative Mike Miller and the House Local Government Committee. He was recognized as a liberal candidate in the 1972 elections, where he finished second in the primary and was elected to the House, alongside Oral Freeman. In 1978, he became the youngest Speaker of the House at age 28.

Gardiner also served as the Chairman of the Alaska Criminal Code Commission.
