= Don Bennett (Alaska politician) =

American politician

Donald J. Bennett
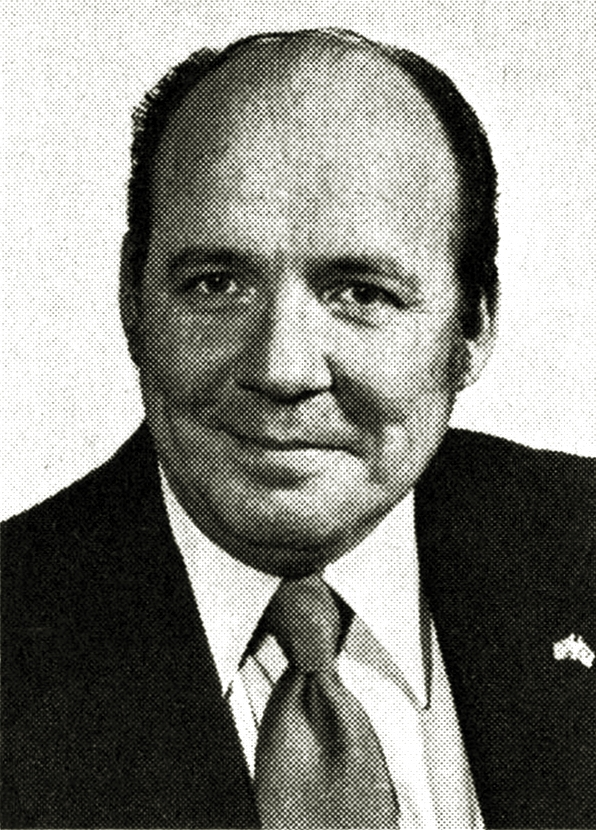
- Don Bennett

Member of the Alaska Senate
- In office 1979–1987

Member of the Alaska House of Representatives
- In office 1977–1979

Personal details
- Born: May 6, 1931 Fresno, California, U.S.
- Died: August 30, 1987 (aged 56) Fairbanks, Alaska, U.S.
- Party: Republican
- Education: San Jose University; University of Maryland

Donald J. Bennett (May 6, 1931 – August 30, 1987) was a United States military officer, politician, and a businessman.

Born in Fresno, California, Bennett attended San Jose State University and the University of Maryland. He served in the United States Army and retired as a lieutenant colonel. Bennett lived in Fairbanks, Alaska and was a businessman. He served in the Alaska House of Representatives from 1977 to 1979 and was a Republican. Bennett then served in the Alaska Senate from 1979 until his death. Bennett was president of the senate. Bennett died at Fairbanks Memorial Hospital in Fairbanks, Alaska after suffering a heart attack.
