= Tim Kelly (Alaska politician) =

American businessman and politician

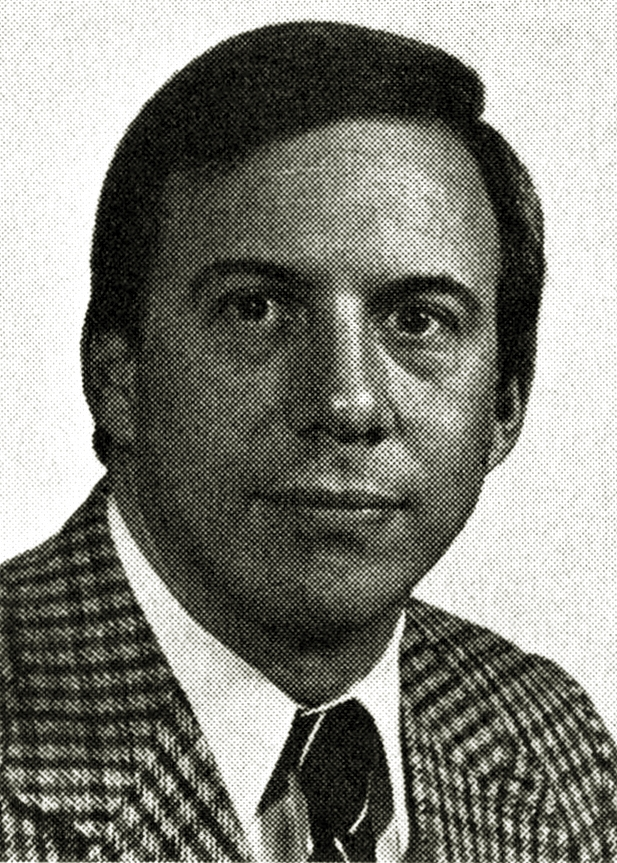
Portrait of Timothy Donahue "Tim" Kelly

Timothy Donahue Kelly (August 15, 1944 – August 17, 2009) was an American businessman and politician.

Born in Sacramento, California, Kelly graduated from Sacramento High School in 1962. He served in the United States Marine Corps and later in the Alaska Air National Guard. He was a legislative aide in California and Nevada. In 1970, he moved to Alaska and settled in Anchorage, Alaska. He was in the banking business.

A Republican, Kelly was elected to the Alaska House of Representatives in 1976 and the Alaska State Senate in 1978. During his time as senator, Kelly represented both East Anchorage and Eagle River districts due to changes in electoral district boundaries through the years. Kelly also served as the Senate Rules Committee chair from 1981-1982, 1985-1986, and 1993-1996. In 1989, Kelly was elected Senate president, but he left the Senate in 1990 to campaign, unsuccessfully, for lieutenant governor. He was reelected to the Senate in 1992 and again in 1996. Kelly decided not to seek reelection in 2000, and instead began working as a lobbyist representing medical and insurance clients. Kelly died at his home, in Anchorage, Alaska, from heart problems.

Kelly married Lisa Nelson and the couple had two children.
