= Mike Colletta =

American businessman and politician

Senator Michael J Colletta, Sr
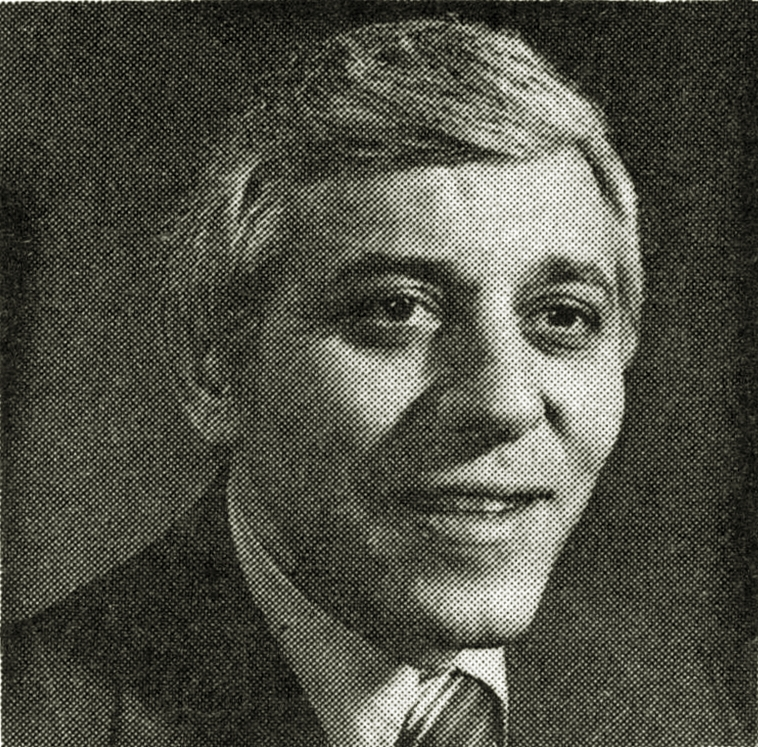

Member of the Alaska Senate from the I district
- In office 1975–1983
- Preceded by: John C. Sackett
- Succeeded by: Jay Kerttula

Representing the 8th District of the Alaska House of Representatives
- In office January 11, 1971 – 1972
- Preceded by: Helen D. Beirne
- Succeeded by: Jay Kerttula
- Constituency: Anchorage

Personal details
- Party: Republican

Michael J. Colletta, Sr. (September 1, 1924 – January 24, 2007) was a businessman and Republican politician in the U.S. state of Alaska.

Colletta served one term in the Alaska House of Representatives, during the 7th State Legislature (1971-1972), representing the 8th district from Anchorage. He served two terms in the Alaska Senate, from 1975 to 1982, culminating with being the Republican nominee for lieutenant governor, running alongside Tom Fink in the 1982 election.

Party political offices
Preceded by Terry Miller	Republican nominee for Lieutenant Governor of Alaska; 1982	Succeeded by Terry Miller
