= Jay Kerttula =

American politician (1928–2020)

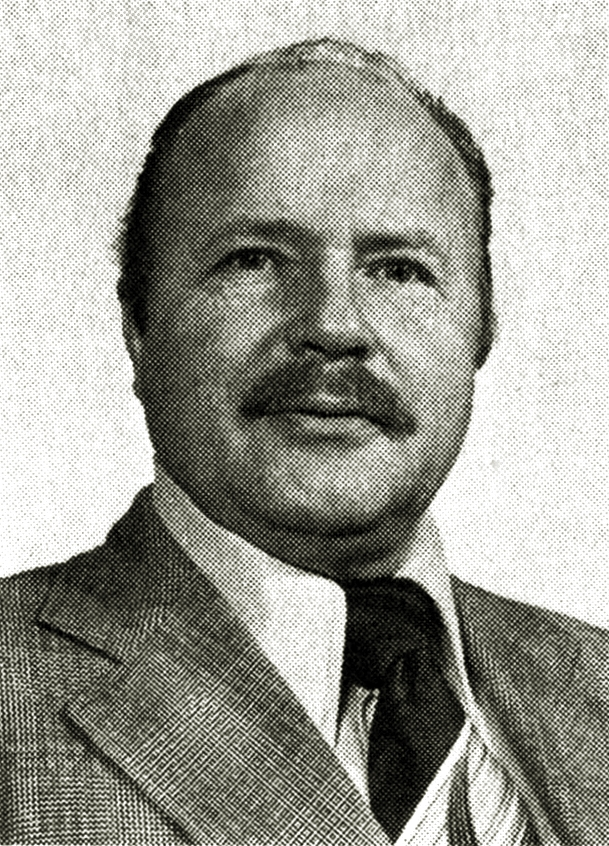

President of the Alaska Senate
- In office January 12, 1981 – January 12, 1985
- Preceded by: Clem Tillion
- Succeeded by: Don Bennett

Personal details
- Born: April 6, 1928 Milwaukee, Wisconsin, U.S.
- Died: November 13, 2020 (aged 92) Juneau, Alaska
- Party: Democratic
- Spouse: Helen Joyce Campbell (m. 1955; died 2015)

Jalmar Martin "Jay" Kerttula (April 6, 1928 – November 13, 2020) was an American businessman, farmer, and politician in Alaska. A member of the Democratic Party, Kerttula was the longest-serving member of the Alaska Legislature, having served in the House from 1961 to 1963 and 1965 to 1973 and in the Senate from 1973 to 1995, until his record was surpassed by Lyman Hoffman in 2019.

== Early life ==
Jalmar Kerttula, commonly known as "Jay", was born in Milwaukee, Wisconsin, on April 6, 1928, the son of Finnish immigrants. In 1935 the family relocated to the Matanuska Valley Colony, a New Deal agricultural resettlement program, located Northeast of Anchorage.

Kerttula graduated from Palmer High School and went on to study at the University of Alaska and the University of Washington. Following his graduation Kerttula became the manager of a dairy cooperative. He also worked as a real estate developer in the Matanuska Valley.

In 1955, Kerttula married Helen Joyce Campbell, known as Joyce, who helped manage his office and campaigns throughout his political career. She died in 2015. Their oldest daughter, Beth Kerttula, was a state representative from Juneau for 15 years, until she left to take a fellowship at Stanford University and from there took a post with the Obama administration.

== Political career ==
Kerttula was first elected to the Alaska House of Representatives in 1960, representing the city of Palmer in the state capital serving from 1961 to 1963. He ran for election again in 1964 and returned to office for four consecutive terms, 1965 to 1973. He was chosen at the organizational meeting for the body's 1969 session by his Democratic party peers to serve as the Speaker of the Alaska House of Representatives from 1969 to 1970. In 1972 he was elected to the state senate, serving from 1973 to 1995, and was the Alaska Senate President (1981–1984).

== Legacy ==
Matanuska-Susitna College has a Jalmar Kerttula Building (called the JKB) named for him. It is where most of the English, computer network support, and biology classes are held. It also houses the academic affairs office, director's office, marketing, student government office, and bookstore.

Kerttula Hall is named after him at the Matanuska Experiment Farm and Extension Center in Palmer, AK, which is part of the University of Alaska Fairbanks.

== See also ==
- Raymond Rebarchek Colony Farm – Rebarchek became Kerttula's stepfather after his father's death in the 1960s

Alaska House of Representatives
Preceded by James J. Hurley	Member of the Alaska House of Representatives from the 9th district 1961–1963	Succeeded by Charles E. Cole, Sr.
Preceded by Eugene Reid	Member of the Alaska House of Representatives from the 7th district 1965–1973	Succeeded by Genie Chance; Jo Ann Miller; Edward G. Barber; William K. Parker; Russ Meekins Jr.
Alaska Senate
Preceded by Jan M. Koslosky	Member of the Alaska Senate from D district 1973–1983	Succeeded by Paul A. Fischer
Preceded by Mike Colletta	Member of the Alaska Senate from I district 1983–1985	Succeeded by Rick Halford
Preceded by Fritz Pettyjohn	Member of the Alaska Senate from E-A district 1985–1993	Succeeded by Judith E. Salo
Preceded by Fred Zharoff	Member of the Alaska Senate from N district 1993–1995	Succeeded by Lyda Green
Political offices
Preceded by William K. Boardman	Speaker of the Alaska House of Representatives; 1969–1971	Succeeded by Gene Guess
Preceded by Clem Tillion	President of the Alaska Senate; 1981–1985	Succeeded by Don Bennett
