= Hugh Malone =

American surveyor and politician

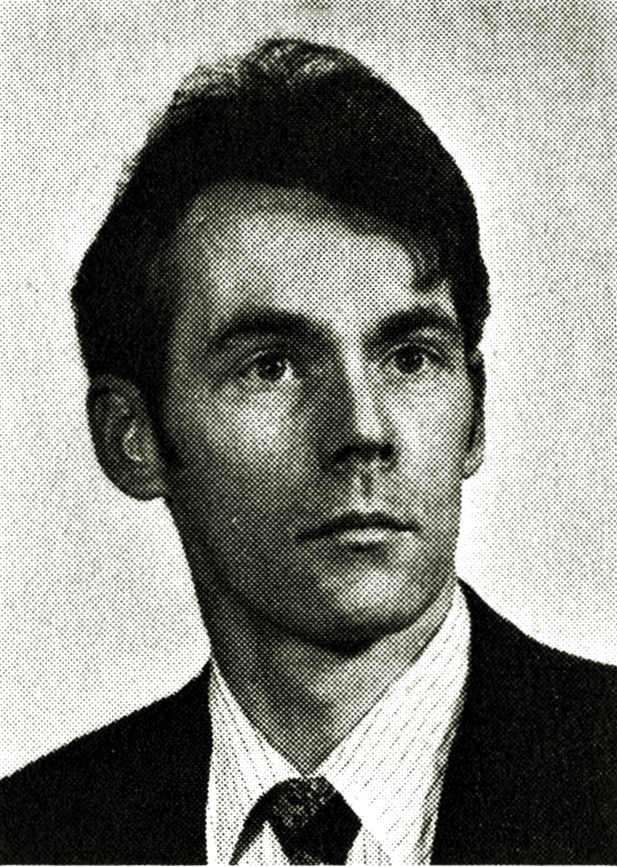
Hugh Malone in 1977

James Hugh Malone (January 22, 1944 – March 8, 2001) was an American surveyor and politician.

Born in Catskill, Greene County, New York, Malone moved with his family to Kenai, Alaska and went to school there. He was a land surveyor and worked with his father. Malone served in the Kenai City Council and Kenai Borough Assembly. From 1973 to 1985, Malone served in the Alaska House of Representatives and was a Democrat. In 1977 and 1978, Malone served as speaker of the house. While in the legislature Malone created and introduced legislation that would later create the Alaska Permanent Fund. Malone then served as a commissioner for the Alaska Department of Revenue. While on vacation with his wife in Italy, Malone died as the result of a head injury.

Malone was succeeded by Mike Navarre.
