= Jim Duncan (Alaska politician) =

American politician

Jim Duncan (born May 4, 1942 in Muscatine, Iowa) is an Alaskan state and local officeholder, educator and government and union executive.

== Early life and education ==
Jim Duncan was born to Paul and Hazel Duncan in Muscatine, Iowa on the Mississippi River. He graduated from Rockridge High School in Taylor Ridge, Illinois in 1960 and earned a Associates of Arts degree from Sheldon Jackson College, in Sitka, Alaska in 1962, He went to Seattle University and graduated with a B.A. degree from Illinois State University in Normal, Illinois in 1965. He received a master's degree in business administration from Oregon State University in Corvallis, Oregon in 1970.

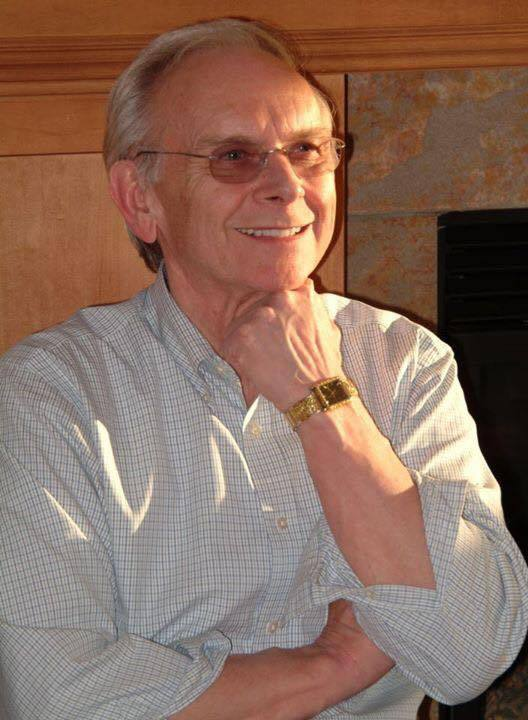
Jim Duncan posing at Southcliff Circle in the Rabbit Creek neighborhood of Anchorage, October 2011

== Career ==
Duncan was an accountant and taught at Sheldon Jackson College, Sitka Community College, and the Juneau-Douglas Community College.

He was the controller for the tribal Tlingit-Haida Regional Housing Authority. He was a supervisor in Alaska's Department of Revenue, the Commissioner of the Department of Administration during Tony Knowles' governorship, and was the business manager of the Alaska State Employees Association (ASEA), an AFSCME affiliate which is the state's largest union.

From 1972 to 1974, Duncan was appointed and elected as a member of the Assembly of the City and Borough of Juneau, Alaska. He was a Democratic party candidate for Alaska U.S. Representative in the general election of 1998, running against incumbent Representative Don Young, who at the time was in his 13th term in office. Duncan was the executive director of ASEA from February 2003 through December 2017.

== Tenure ==
Duncan served on the Juneau-Douglas borough assembly, in the Alaska House of Representatives from 1975-1986 (as speaker from 1981–1982), and as a state senator from 1987–1998. He had a term as minority leader in the House.

== Personal ==
Jim and his wife Carol Jean Acevada, who was a Tlingit tribal member, business owner, and educator from Kake, Alaska have seven children: Jim Jr., Desiree, Michelle, Derek, Jon, Marc, Caron, and, by his second wife Charlotte, stepdaughter Kathy.
