= M. Mike Miller =

American writer and politician

Mike Miller
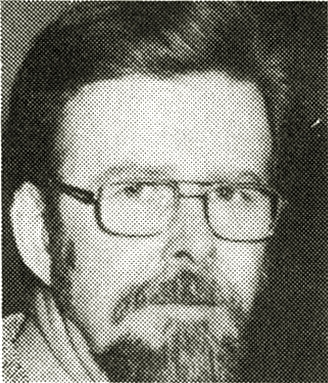
- Headshot of Mike Miller

Member of the Alaska Department of Corrections Parole Board
- In office 1987 – 1992
- In office 1997–2002

Member of the Alaska House of Representatives
- In office 1972–1987

Personal details
- Born: Mortimer Michael Miller; July 17, 1929 Trinidad, Colorado, U.S.
- Died: February 11, 2017 (aged 87) Vancouver, Washington, U.S.
- Party: Democratic
- Education: Wichita State University (BA)

Mortimer Michael Miller (July 17, 1929 – February 11, 2017) was an American writer and politician.

== Early life and education ==
Born in Trinidad, Colorado, Miller received his bachelor's degree in journalism from Wichita State University.

== Career ==
In 1954, Miller moved to Ketchikan, Alaska. Miller worked for Alaska Sportsmen magazine (now Alaska). In 1960, Miller and his family moved to Juneau, Alaska, and he was worked as the publicity director for the Alaska Division of Tourism. Miller also wrote several books and articles. Miller served on the Juneau City and Borough Assembly as a Democrat. From 1971 to 1987, Miller served in the Alaska House of Representatives. From 1987 to 1992 and from 1997 to 2002, Miller served on the Alaska Department of Corrections Parole Board.

== Death ==
Miller died from pneumonia in Vancouver, Washington.
