= 5th Alaska State Legislature =

Term of state legislature in Alaska, US

The Fifth Alaska State Legislature served from January 23, 1967, to January 26, 1969.

The Alaska Legislature had largely been controlled by the Democratic Party since statehood took effect in 1959, as was the case with most territorial legislatures stretching as far back as the early 1930s. In the 1966 elections, Alaska followed the rest of the nation and voted Republican: incumbent governor William A. Egan and incumbent U.S. Representative Ralph J. Rivers both lost reelection to Republican challengers (Walter J. Hickel and Howard W. Pollock, respectively). Republicans also wound up with control of both houses of the legislature, though many of the Republicans newly elected in 1966 only served in this legislature.

This Senate saw major changes in its composition. In response to the "one man, one vote" decision of the United States Supreme Court in Reynolds v. Sims, the area-based apportionment scheme established for the Senate in the state constitution was abandoned, and the Senate was apportioned strictly on a population basis like the House. Jay Hammond, who served in the House in the first three legislatures before returning home to Naknek to serve as manager of the Bristol Bay Borough, was newly elected as a senator from a district which stretched as far north as Bettles and as far south as the Alaska Peninsula. In the 1966 election, Hammond defeated Democratic incumbent Grant Pearson, who lived in Nenana, 480 miles (770 km) from Naknek. Under population-based apportionment, many future legislative districts in rural Alaska would also cover vast amounts of the state.

== Senate ==
=== Senate members ===
District	Name	Party	Location
A	Robert H. Ziegler, Sr.	Dem	Ketchikan
B	Howard C. Bradshaw	Dem	Sitka
C	Elton E. Engstrom, Jr.	Rep	Juneau
D	Jan M. Koslosky	Rep	Palmer
E	Nicholas J. Begich	Dem	Anchorage
E	Carl F. Brady	Rep	Anchorage
E	Frank W. Harris	Rep	Anchorage
E	Clyde R. Lewis	Rep	Anchorage
E	Brad Phillips	Rep	Anchorage
E	Vance Phillips	Rep	Anchorage
E	Lowell Thomas, Jr.	Rep	Spenard
F	Walter I. "Bob" Palmer	Rep	Ninilchik
G	Bill M. Poland	Dem	Kodiak
H	Jay S. Hammond	Rep	Naknek
I	John Butrovich, Jr.	Rep	Fairbanks
I	Paul B. Haggland	Rep	Fairbanks
I	V. Maurice Smith	Rep	Fairbanks
I	William I. Waugaman	Rep	Fairbanks
J	Robert R. Blodgett	Dem	Teller
K	Raymond C. Christiansen	Dem	Bethel

=== Senate leadership ===
- President of the Senate – John Butrovich (R-Fairbanks)

=== Senate committee assignments ===
- Commerce
  - Brady (chair), Harris (vice-chair), Koslosky, Waugaman, Christiansen
- Finance
  - V. Phillips (chair), Haggland (vice-chair), Lewis, Brady, Smith, Engstrom, Blodgett
- Health, Welfare and Education
  - Smith (chair), Thomas (vice-chair), Koslosky, Begich
- Judiciary
  - Harris (chair), Ziegler (vice-chair), Waugaman, Hammond, Begich
- Labor and Management
  - Thomas (chair), Palmer (vice-chair), Lewis, Bradshaw, Christiansen
- Local government
  - Koslosky (chair), Lewis (vice-chair), Harris, Poland, Bradshaw
- Resources
  - Hammond (chair), Waugaman (vice-chair), Palmer, Lewis, Blodgett
- Rules
  - B. Phillips (chair), Ziegler (vice-chair), Haggland, Hammond, Smith
- State Affairs
  - Engstrom (chair), Thomas (vice-chair), Haggland, Poland

== House ==
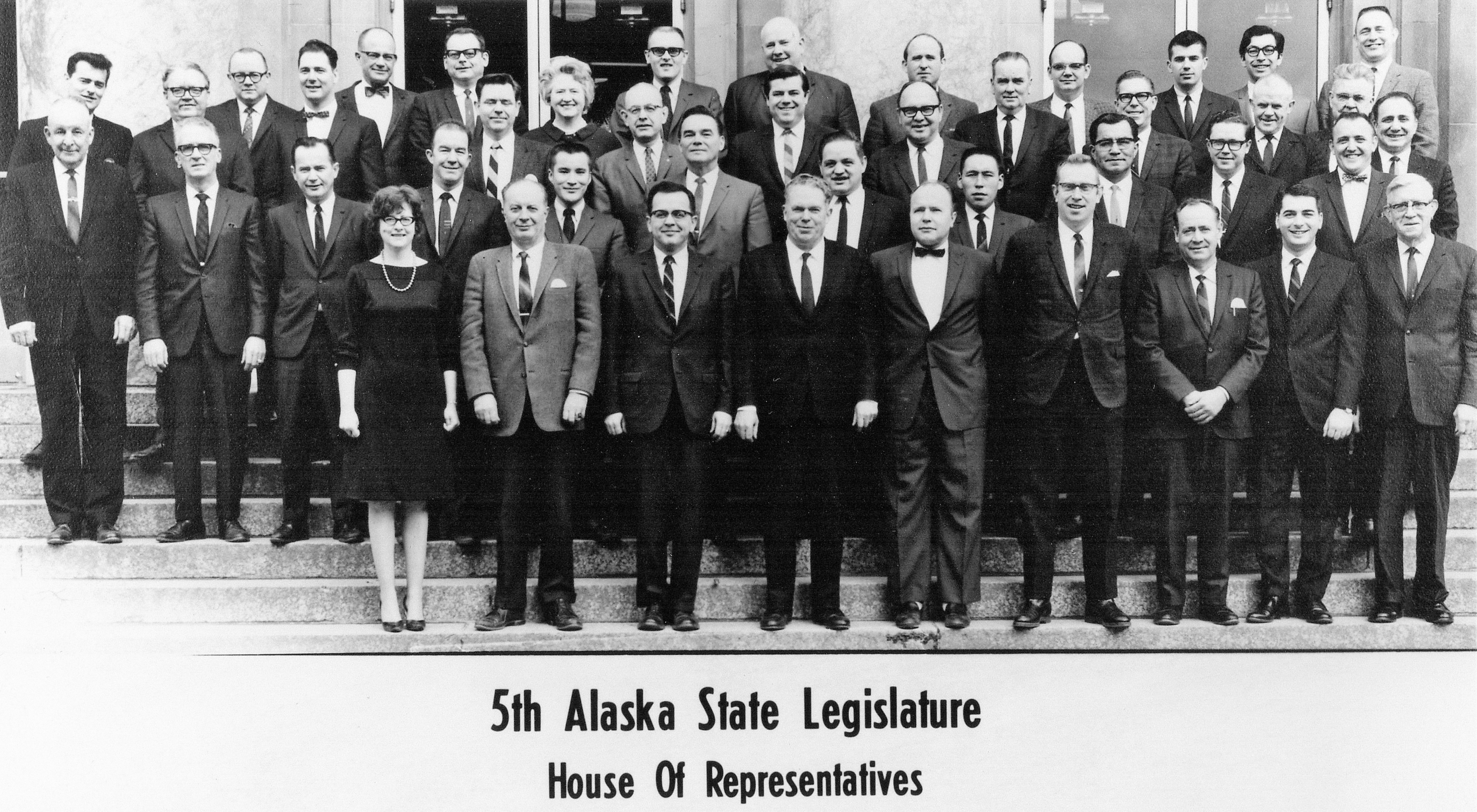
The House in 1968.

=== House members ===
District	Name	Party	Location
1	William K. Boardman	Republican	Ketchikan
1	Edwin J. "Pete" Cessnun	Republican	Ketchikan
2	Ernest J. Haugen	Republican	Petersburg
3	Frank Getman	Democratic	Sitka
4	Mildred H. Banfield	Republican	Juneau
4	Bill Ray	Democratic	Juneau
5	Frank See	Democratic	Hoonah
6	R. R. Borer	Republican	Cordova
7	Jalmar M. Kerttula	Democratic	Palmer
8	Michael F. Beirne	Republican	Anchorage
8	Ken Brady	Republican	Anchorage
8	Tom Fink	Republican	Anchorage
8	Milo H. Fritz	Republican	Anchorage
8	Gene Guess	Democratic	Anchorage
8	Jess Harris	Republican	Anchorage
8	Mortimer M. Moore	Republican	Anchorage
8	William J. Moran	Democratic	Anchorage
8	Charles J. Sassara, Jr.	Democratic	Anchorage
8	Jack R. Simpson	Republican	Anchorage
8	Don Smith	Republican	Anchorage
8	Ted Stevens	Republican	Anchorage
8	Harold D. Strandberg	Republican	Anchorage
8	William C. Wiggins	Republican	Anchorage
9	Irwin L. Metcalf	Democratic	Seward
10	Clem V. Tillion	Republican	Halibut Cove
11	Charles A. Powell	Republican	Kodiak
12	Carl E. Moses	Republican	Unalaska
13	Joseph E. McGill	Democratic	Dillingham
14	George H. Hohman, Jr.	Democratic	Bethel
15	John C. Sackett	Republican	Fairbanks
16	Tury F. Anderson	Republican	Fairbanks
16	Mike Bradner	Democratic	Fairbanks
16	John Holm	Republican	Fairbanks
16	Terry Miller	Republican	North Pole
16	Edmund N. Orbeck	Democratic	Fairbanks
16	Jules Wright	Republican	Fairbanks
16	Donald E. Young	Republican	Fort Yukon
17	Willie Hensley	Democratic	Kotzebue
18	Thomas J. Balone	Democratic	Nome
19	John L. Westdahl (1-23-67 – 2-18-68)	Democratic	St. Mary's
19	Vacant (2-18-68 – 2-26-68)		
19	Moses Paukan (2-26-68 – 1-26-69)	Democratic	St. Mary's

=== House leadership ===
- Speaker of the House – William K. Boardman (R-Ketchikan)
- House Majority Leader - Ted Stevens (R-Anchorage)

=== House committee assignments ===
- Commerce
  - Young (chair), Powell (vice-chair), Beirne, Cessnun, Balone, Getman, Brady, Fink, Bradner
- Committee on Committees
  - Boardman (chair), Stevens (vice-chair), Strandberg, Holm, Kerttula
- Finance
  - Strandberg (chair), Haugen (vice-chair), Miller, Sackett, Sassara, Borer, Ray
- Health, Welfare and Education
  - Banfield (chair), Fritz (vice-chair for health and welfare), Beirne (vice-chair for education), Wiggins, Metcalf, Moran, Wright, Young, Hohman
- Judiciary
  - Fink (chair), Simpson (vice-chair), Tillion, Brady, Metcalf, Hensley, Moses, Fritz, Moran
- Labor and Management
  - Wiggins (chair), Harris (vice-chair), Anderson, Simpson, See, McGill, Moore, Smith, Orbeck
- Local Government
  - Smith (chair), Anderson (vice-chair), Beirne, Powell, Getman, Hohman, Harris, Simpson, Westdahl
- Resources
  - Moses (chair), Anderson (vice-chair for mines and minerals), Moore (vice-chair for fish and game), Tillion, Cessnun, Wright, McGill, Holm, Powell, Hensley, See
- Rules
  - Tillion (chair), Cessnun (vice-chair), Holm, Harris, Balone, Stevens, Kerttula
- State Affairs
  - Holm (chair), Brady (vice-chair), Fritz, Moore, Guess, Bradner, Banfield, Wright, Orbeck

== See also ==
- List of Alaska State Legislatures
- 4th Alaska State Legislature, the legislature preceding this one
- 6th Alaska State Legislature, the legislature following this one
- List of governors of Alaska
- List of speakers of the Alaska House of Representatives
- Alaska Legislature
- Alaska Senate
- {AKLeg.gov}
