= 6th Alaska State Legislature =

Term of state legislature in Alaska, US

The Sixth Alaska State Legislature served from January 1969 to January 1971.

== Senate ==
| District | Name | Party | Location |
|---|---|---|---|
| A | Robert H. Ziegler, Sr. | Democratic | Ketchikan |
| B | Howard C. Bradshaw | Democratic | Sitka |
| C | Elton E. Engstrom, Jr. | Republican | Juneau |
| D | Jan M. Koslosky | Republican | Palmer |
| E | Nicholas J. Begich | Democratic | Anchorage |
| E | Joseph P. Josephson | Democratic | Anchorage |
| E | Clyde R. Lewis | Republican | Anchorage |
| E | Brad Phillips | Republican | Anchorage |
| E | Vance Phillips | Republican | Anchorage |
| E | John Rader | Democratic | Anchorage |
| E | Lowell Thomas, Jr. | Republican | Anchorage |
| F | Walter I. "Bob" Palmer | Republican | Ninilchik |
| G | Bill M. Poland (1-27-69 - 3-6-70) | Democratic | Kodiak |
| G | Kathryn Poland (3-6-70 - 1-10-71) | Democratic | Kodiak |
| H | Jay S. Hammond | Republican | Naknek |
| I | John Butrovich, Jr. | Republican | Fairbanks |
| I | Paul B. Haggland | Republican | Fairbanks |
| I | Edward A. Merdes | Democratic | Fairbanks |
| I | Terry Miller | Republican | North Pole |
| J | Robert R. Blodgett | Democratic | Teller |
| K | Raymond C. Christiansen | Democratic | Bethel |

== House ==
| District | Name | Party | Location |
|---|---|---|---|
| 1 | William K. Boardman | Republican | Ketchikan |
| 1 | Frank Peratrovich | Democratic | Klawock |
| 2 | Ernest J. Haugen | Republican | Petersburg |
| 3 | Richard I. Eliason | Republican | Sitka |
| 4 | Mildred Banfield | Republican | Juneau |
| 4 | Bill Ray | Democratic | Juneau |
| 5 | Henry E. Reeves | Republican | Haines |
| 6 | R. R. Borer | Republican | Cordova |
| 7 | Jalmar M. Kerttula | Democratic | Palmer |
| 8 | Helen D. Beirne | Republican | Spenard |
| 8 | Genie Chance | Democratic | Anchorage |
| 8 | Stanley P. Cornelius | Republican | Anchorage |
| 8 | Chancy Croft | Democratic | Anchorage |
| 8 | Tom Fink | Republican | Anchorage |
| 8 | Gene Guess | Democratic | Anchorage |
| 8 | Jess Harris | Republican | Anchorage |
| 8 | Earl D. Hillstrand | Democratic | Anchorage |
| 8 | Wendell P. Kay | Democratic | Anchorage |
| 8 | Richard L. McVeigh | Democratic | Anchorage |
| 8 | Ron L. Rettig | Republican | Anchorage |
| 8 | Charles J. Sassara, Jr. | Democratic | Anchorage |
| 8 | John A. Schwamm | Democratic | Anchorage |
| 8 | John M. Sweet | Republican | Anchorage |
| 9 | Irwin L. Metcalf | Democratic | Seward |
| 10 | Clem V. Tillion | Republican | Halibut Cove |
| 11 | Peter M. Deveau | Democratic | Kodiak |
| 12 | Carl E. Moses | Republican | Unalaska |
| 13 | Joseph E. McGill | Democratic | Dillingham |
| 14 | George H. Hohman, Jr. | Democratic | Bethel |
| 15 | John C. Sackett | Republican | Galena |
| 16 | Tury F. Anderson | Republican | Fairbanks |
| 16 | Mike Bradner | Democratic | Fairbanks |
| 16 | John Holm | Republican | Fairbanks |
| 16 | Barry W. Jackson | Democratic | Fairbanks |
| 16 | Eugene V. Miller | Democratic | Fairbanks |
| 16 | Edmund N. Orbeck | Democratic | Fairbanks |
| 16 | Donald E. Young | Republican | Fort Yukon |
| 17 | Willie Hensley | Democratic | Kotzebue |
| 18 | Lester Bronson | Democratic | Nome |
| 19 | Moses Paukan | Democratic | St. Mary's |

== See also ==
- List of Alaska State Legislatures
- 5th Alaska State Legislature, the legislature preceding this one
- 7th Alaska State Legislature, the legislature following this one
- List of governors of Alaska
- List of speakers of the Alaska House of Representatives
- Alaska Legislature
- Alaska Senate
- {AKLeg.gov}
