= Engström =

Engström, Engstrøm and Engstrom are surnames of Swedish and Norwegian origin. The name may refer to:

== Engström ==
- Adolf Engström (1855–1924), Finnish engineer, businessman and vuorineuvos
- Albert Engström (1869–1940), Swedish artist and author
- Carl Engström (born 1991), Swedish basketball player
- Carl Gunnar Engström (1912–1987), Swedish physician and innovator
- Cecilia Engström (born 1972), Swedish politician
- Christian Engström (born 1960), Swedish computer programmer, activist and politician
- David Engström (born 1990), Swedish footballer
- Désirée Pethrus Engström (born 1959), Swedish Christian Democratic politician
- Elin Engström (1860–1957), Swedish politician and trade unionist
- Gunvor Engström (born 1950), Swedish business personality and civil servant
- Hillevi Engström (born 1963), Swedish politician of the Moderate Party
- JH Engström (born 1969), Swedish artist
- Johan Engström (born 1976), Swedish professional darts player
- Josefine Engström, Swedish ski-orienteering competitor and World Champion
- Lilly Engström (1843–1921), Swedish pedagogue and women's rights activist
- Marie Engström (born 1953), Swedish Left Party politician
- Mats Engström (born 1955), Swedish businessman and chairman
- Odd Engström (1941–1998), Swedish politician
- Patrik Engström (born 1968), Swedish politician
- Robin Engström (born 1971), Swedish drummer of the heavy metal band Morgana Lefay
- Stig Engström (1934–2000), Swedish graphic designer and suspected murderer
- Thomas Engström (born 1975), Swedish novelist and journalist
- Tomas Engström (born 1964), Swedish auto racing driver
- Victor Engström (1989–2013), Swedish bandy player

== Engstrom ==
- Arnell Engstrom (1897–1970), American businessman and politician
- Art Engstrom (1898–1953), American football player
- Dale Engstrom (1917–2018), American businessman and politician
- Elizabeth Engstrom, American speculative fiction writer
- Elton Engstrom Jr. (1935–2013), American lawyer, businessman, writer, and politician
- Elton Engstrom Sr. (1905–1963), American businessman and politician
- Elmer William Engstrom (1901–1984), American engineer and corporate executive
- Eric Engstrom (1959–2020), American software engineer
- Jean Engstrom (1920–1997) American actress
- Jena Engstrom, American former television actress
- Molly Engstrom, American ice hockey player
- Ted Engstrom, American evangelical leader and author
- Thelma Engstrom (1905–1957), American educator, journalist, and politician
- Victor E. Engstrom (1913–2000), American philatelist
- The Engstrom political family of Southeast Alaska, including:
  - Cathy (Engstrom) Muñoz (born 1964), American politician; member of the Alaska House of Representatives

== Engstrøm ==
- Birk Engstrøm (born 1950), former Norwegian football striker
- Susanne Engstrøm (born 1949), Danish pharmaconomist and president of The Danish Association of Pharmaconomists

== Other uses ==
- 7548 Engström, main belt asteroid with an orbital period of 5.59 years
- Lars Peter Engström, character in the short story Three Versions of Judas by the Argentine author Jorge Luis Borges
- Engström Motorsport, Swedish motorsport team owned by its driver Tomas Engström
- USS Engstrom (DE-50), Evarts class destroyer escort constructed for the United States Navy during World War II

== See also ==
- Enstrom, surnames and other uses
