= List of United States political families (E) =

The following is an alphabetical list of political families in the United States whose last name begins with E.

== The Eagles and Oldhams ==
- James Philip Eagle (1837–1904), Governor of Arkansas 1889–93. Brother-in-law of William Kavanaugh Oldham.
- William Kavanaugh Oldham (1865–1938), Arkansas State Representative 1907, Arkansas State Senator 1911–13, Governor of Arkansas 1913. Brother-in-law of James Philip Eagle.

== The Eagletons ==
- Mark D. Eagleton, candidate for Mayor of St. Louis, Missouri 1953. Father of Thomas Eagleton.
  - Thomas Eagleton (1929–2007), Circuit Attorney of St. Louis, Missouri; Attorney General of Missouri 1961–65; Lieutenant Governor of Missouri 1965–68; U.S. Senator from Missouri 1968–87; candidate for Vice President of the United States 1972, withdrew nomination. Son of Mark D. Eagleton.

== The Earles ==
- Elias Earle (1762–1823), South Carolina State Representative 1794–97, South Carolina State Senator 1800, U.S. Representative from South Carolina 1805–07 1811–15. Uncle of Samuel Earle and John Baylis Earle.
  - Samuel Earle (1760–1833), South Carolina State Representative 1784–88, delegate to the South Carolina Constitutional Convention 1788 1790, U.S. Representative from South Carolina 1795–97. Nephew of Elias Earle.
  - John Baylis Earle (1766–1863), U.S. Representative from South Carolina 1803–05. Nephew of Elias Earle.
    - Joseph H. Earle (1847–1897), South Carolina State Court Judge, U.S. Senator from South Carolina 1897. Great-grandson of Elias Earle.
    - John L.M. Irby (1854–1900), member of the South Carolina Legislature, U.S. Senator from South Carolina 1891–97. Great-grandson of Elias Earle.

NOTE: Joseph H. Earle was also nephew of U.S. Representative William L. Yancey.

== The Earles of Pennsylvania ==
- Thomas Earle, Liberty Party U. S. Vice Presidential candidate in 1840. Grandfather of George H. Earle Jr.
  - George H. Earle Jr. (1856–1928), candidate for Mayor of Philadelphia, Pennsylvania 1911. Grandson of Thomas Earle and Samuel Van Leer.
    - George Howard Earle III (1890–1974), U.S. Minister to Austria 1933–34, U.S. Minister to Bulgaria 1940–41, Governor of Pennsylvania 1935–39, delegate to the Democratic National Convention 1936, candidate for U.S. Senate from Pennsylvania 1938. Son of George H. Earle Jr.
      - Ambassador Ralph Earle II, director of the Arms Control and Disarmament Agency between 1980 and 1981; deputy director at the agency from 1994 to 1999. From 1978 to 1979 he served as the United States' chief negotiator at the SALT II round of talks on nuclear disarmament. Son of George Howard Earle III.

== The Earlls ==
- Jonas Earll (1751–1847), New York Assemblyman 1820-21. Father of Jonas Earll Jr.
  - Jonas Earll Jr. (1786–1846), Sheriff of Onondaga County, New York 1815–19; New York Assemblyman 1820; New York State Senator 1823–26; U.S. Representative from New York 1827–31; Postmaster of Syracuse, New York 1840–42; Erie Canal Commissioner 1831-40, 1842-46. Son of Jonas Earll.
  - Nehemiah H. Earll (1787–1872), Postmaster of Onondaga Hill, New York 1816; Justice of the Peace in New York 1816–20; Judge of Onondaga County, New York 1823–31; U.S. Representative from New York 1839–41. Cousin of Jonas Earll Jr.

== The Easleys ==
- Mike Easley (born 1950), Attorney General of North Carolina from 1993 to 2001, Governor of North Carolina from 2001 to 2009.
- Mary P. Easley, First Lady of North Carolina from 2001 to 2009.
  - Michael F. Easley Jr. (born 1985), United States Attorney for the United States District Court for the Eastern District of North Carolina, son of Mike Easley and Mary P. Easley.

== The Eastmans ==
- Nehemiah Eastman (1782–1856), New Hampshire State Representative 1813, New Hampshire State Senator 1820–25, U.S. Representative from New Hampshire 1825–27. Uncle of Ira Allen Eastman.
  - Ira Allen Eastman (1809–1881), New Hampshire State Representative 1836–38, U.S. Representative from New Hampshire 1839–43, Judge of the New Hampshire Court of Common Pleas 1844–49, Justice of the New Hampshire Supreme Court 1849–55, Judge of the New Hampshire Superior Court 1855–59, candidate for Governor of New Hampshire 1863, candidate for U.S. Senate from New Hampshire 1866. Nephew of Nehemiah Eastman.

== The Eastons ==
- Nicholas Easton (1593–1675), President of Rhode Island Colony 1650–51 1654, Deputy Governor of Rhode Island Colony 1666–69 1670–71, Governor of Rhode Island Colony 1672–74. Father of John Easton.
  - John Easton (1624–1705), Attorney General of Newport and Portsmouth, Attorney General of Rhode Island Colony 1656–74, Deputy Governor of Rhode Island Colony 1674–76, Rhode Island Colony Assemblyman, Governor of Rhode Island 1690–95. Son of Nicholas Easton.

== The Eatons ==
- Charles Aubrey Eaton (1868–1953), U.S. Representative from New Jersey 1925–53. Uncle of William R. Eaton.
  - William R. Eaton (1877–1942), Colorado State Senator 1915–18 1923–26, U.S. Representative from Colorado 1929–33. Nephew of Charles Aubrey Eaton.

== The Eckhardts and Klebergs ==
- Rudolph Kleberg (1847–1924), Prosecuting Attorney of De Witt County, Texas 1876–90; Texas State Senator 1882–86; U.S. Attorney in Texas; U.S. Representative from Texas 1896–1903. Uncle of Richard Kleberg, Sr.
  - Richard Kleberg, Sr. (1887–1955), U.S. Representative from Texas 1931–45. Nephew of Rudolph Kleberg.
    - Robert C. Eckhardt (1913–2001), Texas State Representative 1958–66, U.S. Representative from Texas 1967–81. Grandnephew of Rudolph Kleberg.

NOTE: Robert C. Eckhardt was also nephew of U.S. Representative Harry Wurzbach.

== The Edgertons ==
- Alfred Peck Edgerton (1813–1897), Ohio State Senator 1845–46, U.S. Representative from Ohio 1851–55. Brother of Joseph K. Edgerton.
- Joseph K. Edgerton (1818–1893), U.S. Representative from Indiana 1863–65. Brother of Alred Peck Edgerton.

== The Edgertons and Sanders ==
- Wilbur F. Sanders (1834–1905), candidate for U.S. Congressional Delegate from Montana Territory 1864 1867 1880 1886, delegate to the Republican National Convention 1868, Montana Territory Representative 1873–79, U.S. Senator from Montana 1890–93. Uncle of Sidney Edgerton.
  - Sidney Edgerton (1818–1900), U.S. Representative from Ohio 1859–63, Justice of the Idaho Territory Supreme Court 1863, Governor of Montana Territory 1864–65. Nephew of Wilbur F. Sanders.

== The Edmonds ==
- Franklin Spencer Edmonds, Pennsylvania State Representative 1921–26, Pennsylvania State Senator 1939. Brother of George W. Edmonds.
- George W. Edmonds (1864–1939), U.S. Representative from Pennsylvania 1913–25 1933–35. Brother of Franklin Spencer Edmonds.

== The Edmondsons ==
- J. Howard Edmondson (1925–1971), Governor of Oklahoma
- Ed Edmondson (1919–1990), U.S. Congressman from Oklahoma, brother of J. Howard Edmondson
- Jeanette Bartleson (1925–1990), Oklahoma Secretary of State. Wife of J. Howard Edmondson.
  - Drew Edmondson (born 1946), Oklahoma Attorney General, son of Ed Edmondson
  - James E. Edmondson (born 1945), Oklahoma Supreme Court Justice, son of Ed Edmondson

== The Edwards ==
- William D. Edwards (1853–1916), New Jersey State Senator 1887–89. Brother of Edward I. Edwards.
- Edward I. Edwards (1863–1931), Comptroller of New Jersey 1911–17, New Jersey State Senator 1919, Governor of New Jersey 1920–23, candidate for the Democratic nomination for President of the United States 1920, U.S. Senator from New Jersey 1923–29, delegate to the Democratic National Convention 1928. Brother of William D. Edwards.

== The Edwards and Leonards ==
- John Edwards (1796–1843), U.S. Representative from Pennsylvania 1839–43. Granduncle of John E. Leonard.
  - John E. Leonard (1845–1878), District Attorney in Louisiana 1871–72, U.S. Representative from Louisiana 1877–78. Grandnephew of John Edwards.

== The Edwards, Lincolns, and Porters ==
See Edwards-Lincoln-Porter family

== The Egans ==
- William Allen Egan (1914–1984), Mayor of Valdez, Alaska ca. 1946, Alaska Territorial Representative 1941–45 1947–53, Speaker of Alaska Territorial House 1951–53, Alaska Territorial Senator 1953–57, President of Alaska's Constitutional Convention 1955–56, non-voting "Tennessee Plan" United States Senator from Alaska 1957–59, Governor of Alaska 1959–66 1970–74. Father of Dennis Egan
  - Dennis Egan (born 1947), City and Borough of Juneau, Alaska Assembly (city council) 1989–95, Mayor of Juneau 1995–2000, Alaska State Senator 2009-. Son of William Allen Egan

== The Eids ==
- Troy Eid (born 1963), United States Attorney for the District of Colorado 2006–09.
- Allison H. Eid (born 1965), Solicitor General of Colorado 2005–06, Associate Justice of the Colorado Supreme Court 2006–17, Judge of the United States Court of Appeals for the Tenth Circuit 2017–present. Wife of Troy Eid.

== The Eisenhowers ==
- Dwight D. Eisenhower (1890–1969), General of the United States Army and Supreme Commander, Allied Expeditionary Forces during World War II; 34th President 1953–1961).
- Edgar N. Eisenhower (1889–1971), businessman; brother of Dwight D. Eisenhower
- Earl D. Eisenhower (1898–1968), member of the Illinois House of Representatives 1965–67; brother of Dwight D. Eisenhower.
- Milton S. Eisenhower (1899–1985), U.S. director of War Information 1942–43, vice-presidential candidate in 1980 (on only the Texas ballot); President of The Pennsylvania State University 1950–56; brother of Dwight D. Eisenhower.
  - John Eisenhower (1922-2013), U.S. Ambassador to Belgium; son of Dwight D. Eisenhower.
    - David Eisenhower (born 1948), John's son, eponym of Camp David and son-in-law of Richard Nixon

== The Elams ==
- James M. Elam (1796–1856), candidate for U.S. Representative from Louisiana 1843. Father of James Essex Elam.
  - James Essex Elam (1829–1873), Mayor of Baton Rouge, Louisiana 1858–62 1865–69. Son of James M. Elam.

== The Elberts and Evans ==
- John Evans (1814–1897), Governor of Colorado Territory 1862–65, delegate to the Republican National Convention 1868. Father-in-law of Samuel Hitt Elbert.
  - Samuel Hitt Elbert (1833–1899), member of the Nebraska Territory Legislature 1860, delegate to the Republican National Convention 1860 1884, Secretary of Colorado Territory 1862–66, member of the Colorado Territory Legislature 1869, Governor of Colorado Territory 1873–74, Justice of the Colorado Supreme Court 1877–88. Son-in-law of John Evans.

== The Eliots ==
- Samuel Atkins Eliot (1798–1862), Massachusetts State Representative 1834–37, Mayor of Boston, Massachusetts 1834–37; Massachusetts State Senator 1843–44; U.S. Representative from Massachusetts 1850–51. Great-grandfather of Thomas H. Eliot.
  - Thomas H. Eliot (1907–1991), candidate for U.S. Representative from Massachusetts 1938, U.S. Representative from Massachusetts 1941–43. Great-grandson of Samuel Atkins Eliot.

== The Ellerys and Danas ==
- William Ellery (1727–1820), signer of the Declaration of Independence as a representative of Rhode Island; member of the Continental Congress
  - Christopher Ellery (1768–1840), U.S. Senator from Rhode Island 1801–05. Nephew of William Ellery.
  - Francis Dana, member of the Continental Congress; signer of the Articles of Confederation; son-in-law of William Ellery.
      - Richard Henry Dana Jr., served as United States District Attorney during the Civil War; grandson of Francis Dana and great-grandson of William Ellery.

NOTE: Franics Dana was also son of Boston, Massachusetts Magistrate Richard Dana.

== The Elliotts of California ==
- John B. Elliott (1878–1967), delegate to the Democratic National Convention 1920 1924 1932, candidate for U.S. Senate from California 1926. Father of John C. Elliott.
  - John C. Elliott (1919–2001), Governor of American Samoa 1952. Son of John B. Elliott.

== The Elliotts of Indiana ==
- Jehu Elliott (1813-1876), member of the Indiana House of Representatives, member of the Indiana Senate, Justice of the Indiana Supreme Court 1865-1871. Cousin of Byron Elliott.
- Byron Elliott (1835-1913), Justice of the Indiana Supreme Court 1881-1893. Cousin of Jehu Elliott.

== The Ellsworths ==
- Oliver Ellsworth (1745–1807), U.S. Senator from Connecticut 1789–96, Chief Justice of the U.S. Supreme Court 1796–1800. Father of William W. Ellsworth.
  - William W. Ellsworth (1791–1868), U.S. Representative from Connecticut 1829–34, Governor of Connecticut 1838–42, Justice of the Connecticut Supreme Court 1847–61. Son of Oliver Ellsworth.
- James Ellsworth, Idaho State Senator 1963–77 and President Pro Tem Pore 1969–77, Nicknamed "Bull Ellsworth" as the leader of cattleman Senator regarded as "Serlion Row"
  - Matthew Ellsworth (born 1976), Chief of Staff to Lieutenant Governor Jim Risch of Idaho 2007–present, Deputy Chief of Staff to Governor Risch 2006, Senior Regional Director to United States Senator Mike Crapo of Idaho 1999–2005, Grandson to James Ellsworth

NOTE: Oliver Ellsworth was also grandnephew by marriage of Connecticut Colony Governor Roger Griswold. William W. Ellsworth was also first cousin twice removed of Continental Congressional Delegate Oliver Wolcott, second cousin once removed of U.S. Secretary of the Treasury Oliver Wolcott Jr. and U.S. Representative Roger Griswold, second cousin twice removed of Connecticut Colony Governor William Pitkin, and third cousin once removed of U.S. Representative Matthew Griswold.

== The Elmers ==
- Jonathan Elmer (1745–1817), Delegate to the Continental Congress from New Jersey 1777–78 1881–83 1787–88, U.S. Senator from New Jersey 1789–91. Brother of Ebenezer Elmer.
- Ebenezer Elmer (1752–1843), New Jersey Assemblyman 1789–95, U.S. Representative from New Jersey 1801–07, New Jersey State Senator 1807, Collector of Customs of Bridgeton, New Jersey 1808–17 1822–32. Brother of Jonathan Elmer.
  - Lucius Elmer (1793–1883), New Jersey Assemblyman 1820–23, Prosecuting Attorney of New Jersey 1824, Prosecutor of Pleas of Cumberland County, New Jersey 1824; U.S. Attorney of New Jersey 1824–29; U.S. Representative from New Jersey 1843–45; Attorney General of New Jersey 1850–52; Justice of the New Jersey Supreme Court 1852–69. Son of Ebenezer Elmer.

== The Elys ==
- Addison Ely, candidate for U.S. Representative from New Jersey 1896. Father of William H.J. Ely.
  - William H.J. Ely, District Court Judge in New Jersey 1924–29, New Jersey State Senator 1932–34, delegate to the Democratic National Convention 1940, candidate for U.S. Senate from New Jersey 1938. Son of Addison Ely.
  - Joseph B. Ely (1881–1956), delegate to the Democratic National Convention 1924 1928 1932 1940 1944, Governor of Massachusetts 1931–35. Cousin of William H.J. Ely.

== The Emersons ==
- Allan Emerson, Illinois State Representative 1838–41. Grandfather of Louis L. Emmerson.
  - Louis L. Emmerson (1863–1941), Illinois Republican Committeeman 1910, delegate to the Republican National Convention 1912 1920 1924 1932 1936 1940, Illinois Secretary of States 1917–29, Governor of Illinois 1929–33. Grandson of Allan Emerson.

== The Emersons of New York ==
- Louis W. Emerson (1857–1924), delegate to the Republican National Convention 1888 1892 1896 1912 1916 1924, New York State Senator 1890–93, U.S. Representative from New York 1899–1903. Brother of James A. Emerson.
- James A. Emerson (1865–1922), New York State Senator 1907–18. Brother of Louis W. Emerson.

== The Emersons and Hermanns ==
- Ab Hermann, Executive Director of the Republican National Committee. Father of Jo Ann Emerson.
  - Jo Ann Emerson (born 1950), U.S. Representative from Missouri 1996–2013. Daughter of Ab Hermann.
  - Bill Emerson (1938–1996), U.S. Representative from Missouri 1981–96. Husband of Jo Ann Emerson.

== The Emmitts ==
- John Emmitt (1825–1901), Oregon state senator 1885–1888. Father of Robert A. Emmitt.
  - Robert A. Emmitt (1850–1937), Member of the Oregon House of Representatives 1901–1904. Son of John Emmitt.

== The Endicotts ==
- John Endecott (1588–1665), Governor of Massachusetts Bay Colony 1629–30 1644 1649 1651–53 1655–64. Ancestor of William Crowninshield Endicott and Endicott Peabody.
  - William Crowninshield Endicott (1826–1900), candidate for U.S. Representative from Massachusetts 1879, Justice of Massachusetts Supreme Court 1879–82, candidate for Governor of Massachusetts 1884, U.S. Secretary of War 1885–89. Descendant of John Endecott.
    - Endicott Peabody (1920–1997), Governor of Massachusetts 1963–65, candidate for U.S. Senate from Massachusetts 1966, candidate for Democratic nomination for Vice President of the United States 1972. First cousin three times removed of William Crowninshield Endicott. His grandfather Endicott Peabody was the founder of Groton School.

== The Engels ==
- Albert J. Engel (1888–1959), Michigan State Senator 1921–22 1927–32, U.S. Representative from Michigan 1935–51. Father of Albert J. Engel Jr..
  - Albert J. Engel Jr. (1924–2013), Judge in Michigan, U.S. District Court Judge in Michigan, Judge of U.S. Court of Appeals 1974–88, Chief Judge of U.S. Court of Appeals 1988–89. Son of Albert J. Engel.

== The Englebrights ==
- William F. Englebright (1855–1915), U.S. Representative from California 1906–11. Father of Harry Lane Englebright.
  - Harry Lane Englebright (1884–1943), U.S. Representative from California 1926–43. Son of William F. Englebright.

== The Englers ==
- Mathias J. Engler, candidate for Republican nomination for Michigan State Representative 1968. Father of John Engler.
  - John Engler (born 1948), Michigan State Representative 1971–78, Michigan State Senator 1979–90, Governor of Michigan 1991–2003, delegate to the Republican National Convention 2000. Son of Mathias J. Engler
  - Collen Engler (born 1952), Michigan State Representative 1974–76 1983–86, candidate for Republican nomination for Governor of Michigan 1986, candidate for Lieutenant Governor 1986. Ex-wife of John Engler.

== The Englishes ==
- Elisha Gale English (1797–1874), Indiana State Representative 1832–34 1839–40 1842–43, Indiana State Senator 1845–51 1865–67. Father of William Hayden English.
  - William Hayden English (1822–1896), Secretary of the Indiana Constitutional Convention 1850, Indiana State Representative 1851–52, U.S. Representative from Indiana 1853–61, candidate for Vice President of the United States 1880. Son of Elisha Gale English.
    - William E. English (1850–1926), Indiana State Representative 1880, U.S. Representative from Indiana 1884–85, delegate to the Democratic National Convention 1892 1896, delegate to the Republican National Convention 1912, Indiana State Senator 1917–25. Son of William Hayden English.

== The Engstroms ==
- Elton Egedeous Engstrom, Sr. (1905–1963), Mayor of Douglas, Alaska 1943–44, Alaska Territory Senator 1951–55 1957–59, Alaska State Senator 1961–63. Husband of Thelma Engstrom. Father of Elton Engstrom Jr. and Allan Engstrom
- Thelma Catherine (Wait) Engstrom (1905–1957), Alaska Territory Representative 1947–49, candidate for Alaska Territory Senator 1948. Wife of Elton Engstrom, Sr. Mother of Elton Engstrom Jr. and Allan Engstrom
  - Elton Egedeous Engstrom Jr. (1935-2013), Alaska State Representative 1965–67, Alaska State Senator 1967–71. Son of Elton Engstrom, Sr. and Thelma Engstrom. Brother of Allan Engstrom. Father of Cathy Muñoz
  - Allan Engstrom, City and Borough of Juneau, Alaska Charter Commission 1970, Juneau Assembly (city council) 1972–73. Son of Elton Engstrom, Sr. and Thelma Engstrom. Brother of Elton Engstrom Jr.
    - Catherine Nora (Engstrom) Muñoz (born 1964), Juneau Assembly 1995–2001, candidate for Alaska State Senator 2002, Alaska State Representative 2009-2017. Daughter of Elton Engstrom Jr.

== The Epes and Olivers ==
- James F. Epes (1842–1910), Prosecuting Attorney of Nottoway County, Virginia 1870–83; U.S. Representative from Virginia 1891–95. Cousin of Sydney Parham Epes.
- Sydney Parham Epes (1865–1900), Virginia House Delegate 1891–92, U.S. Representative from Virginia 1897–98 1899–1900. Cousin of James F. Epes.
- William Bacon Oliver (1867–1948), U.S. Representative from Alabama 1915–37. Cousin of Sydney Parham Epes.

== The Erdahls ==
- Arlen Erdahl (born 1931), Minnesota State Representative 1963–70, Secretary of State of Minnesota 1971–75, U.S. Representative from Minnesota 1979–83.
- Dale Erdahl (1931–2005), Minnesota State Representative 1971–74. Cousin of Arlen Erdahl.

== The Erdmans ==
- Jacob Erdman (1801–1867), Pennsylvania State Representative 1834–36, U.S. Representative from Pennsylvania 1845–47, Judge of Lehigh County, Pennsylvania Court 1866–67. Grandfather of Constantine Jacob Erdman.
  - Constantine Jacob Erdman (1846–1911), District Attorney of Allentown, Pennsylvania; U.S. Representative from Pennsylvania 1893–97. Grandson of Jacob Erdman.

== The Ervins ==
- Samuel J. Ervin Jr. (1896–1985), member of the North Carolina House of Representatives, 1923, 1925, 1931, Judge of the Burke County, North Carolina Criminal Court, 1935–37; Judge of the North Carolina Superior Court, 1937–43; U.S. Representative from North Carolina, 1946–47; Justice of the North Carolina Supreme Court, 1948–54; U.S. Senator from North Carolina, 1954–74. Brother of Joseph Wilson Ervin.
  - Samuel James Ervin III, North Carolina State Representative 1965–67, North Carolina Superior Court judge, U.S. Court of Appeals judge. Son of Sam Ervin Jr.
    - Samuel James "Jimmy" Ervin, IV (born 1955), North Carolina Utilities Commissioner, N.C. Court of Appeals judge. Son of Sam Ervin, III.
    - Robert C. Ervin, North Carolina Superior Court judge. Son of Sam Ervin, III.
- Joseph Wilson Ervin (1901–1945), U.S. Representative from North Carolina 1945. Brother of Samuel J. Ervin Jr.

NOTE: Samuel J. Ervin Jr.'s daughter, Laura Powe, was also daughter-in-law of U.S. Representative Hallett S. Ward.

== The Eslicks ==
- Edward Everett Eslick (1872–1932), U.S. Representative from Tennessee, 1925–32.
- Willa McCord Blake Eslick (1878–1961), U.S. Representative from Tennessee, 1932–33. Wife of Edward Everett Eslick.

== The Esteys and Fullers ==
- Jacob Estey (1814–1890), Vermont State Representative 1869–70, Vermont State Senator 1872, candidate for Governor of Vermont 1876. Father-in-law of Levi K. Fuller.
  - Levi K. Fuller (1841–1896), Lieutenant Governor of Vermont 1886–88, Governor of Vermont 1892–94. Son-in-law of Jacob Estey.

== The Eustis and Bohlens ==
- George Eustis Jr. (1828–1872), U.S. Representative from Louisiana 1855–59. Brother of James B. Eustis.
- James B. Eustis (1834–1887), Louisiana State Representative 1865 1872, Louisiana State Senator 1874–78, U.S. Senator from Louisiana 1876–79 1885–91, U.S. Ambassador to France 1893–97. Brother of George Eustis Jr.
  - Charles Bohlen (1904–1974), U.S. Ambassador to Russia 1953–57, U.S. Ambassador to Philippines 1957–59, U.S. Ambassador to France 1962–68, acting U.S. Secretary of State 1969. Grandson of James B. Eustis.
    - Avis Bohlen (born 1940), U.S. Ambassador to Bulgaria 1996–99. Daughter of Chahrles Bohlen.

NOTE: Charles Bohlen was also brother-in-law of U.S. Consul General Charles W. Thayer.

== The Evans and Garys ==
- Martin Witherspoon Gary (1831–1881), South Carolina State Representative, South Carolina State Senator 1877–81. Uncle of John Gary Evans.
  - John Gary Evans (1863–1942), South Carolina State Representative 1889–92, South Carolina State Senator 1893–94, Governor of South Carolina 1894–97, delegate to the South Carolina Constitutional Convention 1895, delegate to the Democratic National Convention 1896 1900 1912 1916, Chairman of the South Carolina Democratic Party 1912–16, Democratic National Committeeman 1918–20. Nephew of Martin Witherspoon Gary.

== The Everetts ==
- Alexander Hill Everett (1790–1847), U.S. Chargé d'Affaires to Netherlands 1818–24, U.S. Minister to Spain 1825–29, U.S. Diplomatic Commissioner to China 1845–47. Brother of Edward Everett.
- Edward Everett (1794–1865), congressman from Massachusetts 1825 to 1835, Governor of Massachusetts 1836 to 1840, senator from Massachusetts 1853 to 1854, Constitutional Union Party candidate for Vice President of the United States 1860.
- Charles Francis Adams, Sr. (1807–1886), Massachusetts State Representative 1831, Massachusetts State Senator 1835–40, candidate for Vice President of the United States 1848, delegate to the Republican National Convention 1856, U.S. Representative from Massachusetts 1859–61, U.S. Minister to Great Britain 1861–68, candidate for Governor of Massachusetts 1876. Brother-in-law of Edward Everett.
  - William Everett (1839–1910), congressman from Massachusetts 1893 to 1895, Democratic candidate for Governor of Massachusetts 1896.

NOTE: Charles Francis Adams was also connected to the Adams family.

== The Everharts ==
- William Everhart (1785–1868), U.S. Representative from Pennsylvania 1853–55. Father of James Bowen Everhart.
  - James Bowen Everhart (1821–1887), Pennsylvania State Senator 1876–82, U.S. Representative from Pennsylvania 1883–87. Son of William Everhart.

== The Evertsons and Smiths ==
- Jacob R. Evertson (1734–1807), New York Colony Congressman 1774–75. Father-in-law of John Cotton Smith.
- Nicholas Evertson (1766–1807), son of Jacob R. Evertson, Grand Sachem of Tammany Hall in New York 1796–97
  - Charles Morgan V (1775–1848), nephew of Jacob R. Evertson, Member from Point Coupee, Louisiana in the Louisiana House of Representatives 1846–48
  - Stephen Van Wickle (1798–1878), grand nephew of Jacob R. Evertson, Member from Point Coupee, Louisiana in the Louisiana House of Representatives 1856
  - James Morgan (congressman) (1756–1822), nephew of Jacob R. Evertson, Democratic-Republican representative to the 12th United States Congress 1811–13.
  - John Cotton Smith (1765–1845), Connecticut State Representative 1800 1806–09, Representative from Connecticut to the Seventh, Eighth and Ninth Congresses 1800–06, Connecticut Superior Court Judge 1809–11, 7th Lieutenant Governor of Connecticut 1811–13, and 22nd governor of Connecticut 1812–17. Son-in-law of Jacob Evertson.
  - Walter Case (1776–1859), nephew of Jacob R. Evertson, Democratic-Republican representative to the 16th United States Congress 1819–21.
- Nicholas Evertson (1776–1807) New York Federalist Member of 23rd Session of the Assembly, 1800.
- Ellsworth Bunker (1894–1984), a descendant of Jacob R. Evertson, United States Ambassador to Argentina 1951, United States Ambassador to Italy 1952, United States Ambassador to India 1956, U.S. Ambassador to the Organization of American States 1964–66, and United States Ambassador to South Vietnam 1967–73.

== The Evins ==
- J. Edgar Evins, delegate to the Democratic National Convention 1940 1944. Father of Joseph Landon Evins.
  - Joseph Landon Evins (1910–1984), U.S. Representative from Tennessee 1947–77, delegate to the Democratic National Convention 1948 1956 1960 1964 1968. Son of J. Edgar Evins.

== The Ewbanks and Halls ==
- John H. Hall (1854–1937), Oregon State Representative 1891–92, U.S. Attorney in Oregon 1897–1904. Second cousin of Lewis Blasdel Ewbank.
- Lewis Blasdel Ewbank (1864–1953), Justice of the Indiana Supreme Court 1920–26. Second cousin of John H. Hall.
  - John Hubert Hall (1899–1970), Oregon State Representative, Governor of Oregon 1947–49, District Court Judge in Oregon. Son of John H. Hall.

== The Ewings ==
- Thomas Ewing (1789–1871), U.S. Senator from Ohio 1831–37 1850–51, U.S. Secretary of the Treasury 1841, U.S. Secretary of the Interior 1849–50. Father of Thomas Ewing Jr.
  - Thomas Ewing Jr. (1829–1896), Chief Justice of the Kansas Supreme Court 1861–62, delegate to the Ohio Constitutional Convention 1873–74, U.S. Representative from Ohio 1877–81, candidate for Governor of Ohio 1879. Son of Thomas Ewing.

== The Ewings of Tennessee ==
- Edwin Hickman Ewing (1809–1902), Tennessee State Representative 1841–42, U.S. Representative from Tennessee 1845–47. Brother of Andrew Ewing.
- Andrew Ewing (1813–1864), U.S. Representative from Tennessee 1849–51, delegate to the Democratic National Convention 1860. Brother of Edwin Hickman Ewing.
