= Senator Engstrom =

Senator Engstrom may refer to:

- Elton Engstrom Jr. (1935–2013), Alaska State Senate
- Elton Engstrom Sr. (1905–1963), Alaska State and Territorial Senate
