= Mildred Banfield =

American politician (1914–1991)

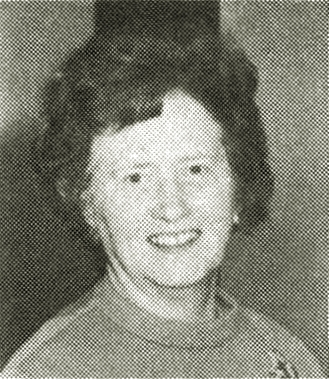

Member of the Alaska Senate from the D district
- In office March 20, 1963 – January 25, 1965
- Appointed by: William A. Egan
- Preceded by: Elton Engstrom Sr.
- Succeeded by: Richard L. Peter

Member of the Alaska House of Representatives from the 4th district
- In office January 23, 1967 – January 20, 1975 Serving with Bill Ray (1967–1971), M. Mike Miller (1971–1975)
- Preceded by: Elton Engstrom Jr.
- Succeeded by: Jim Duncan

Personal details
- Born: January 17, 1914 Fremont, Nebraska, U.S.
- Died: June 5, 1991 (aged 77) Sun City, Arizona, U.S.
- Party: Republican
- Spouse: Norman Banfield (m. 1951)

Mildred Banfield (née Harshburger; January 17, 1914 – June 5, 1991) was a teacher, social worker and Republican politician in the U.S. state of Alaska.

Born in Fremont, Nebraska, Banfield attended Midland College and University of Chicago. She then worked as a teacher and a matron for children's homes before moving to Juneau, Alaska. She married Norman Banfield in 1951, who had been partners for several years with another young lawyer, Robert Boochever. She was appointed to a vacancy in the Alaska Senate in 1963, replacing Elton Engstrom Sr., who died in office. She served until 1965. She was also a member of the Alaska House of Representatives from 1967 to 1975. She was an unsuccessful candidate for reelection in 1974. She also served on the University of Alaska Board of Regents. Banfield Hall at the University of Alaska Southeast is named for her. Banfield died in Sun City, Arizona after suffering from a stroke.
