= Victor Engstrom =

Victor Engstrom may refer to:

- Victor Engström (1989–2013), Swedish bandy player
- Victor E. Engstrom (1914–2000), philatelist
