= Jules Wright (politician) =

American businessman and politician (1933–2022)

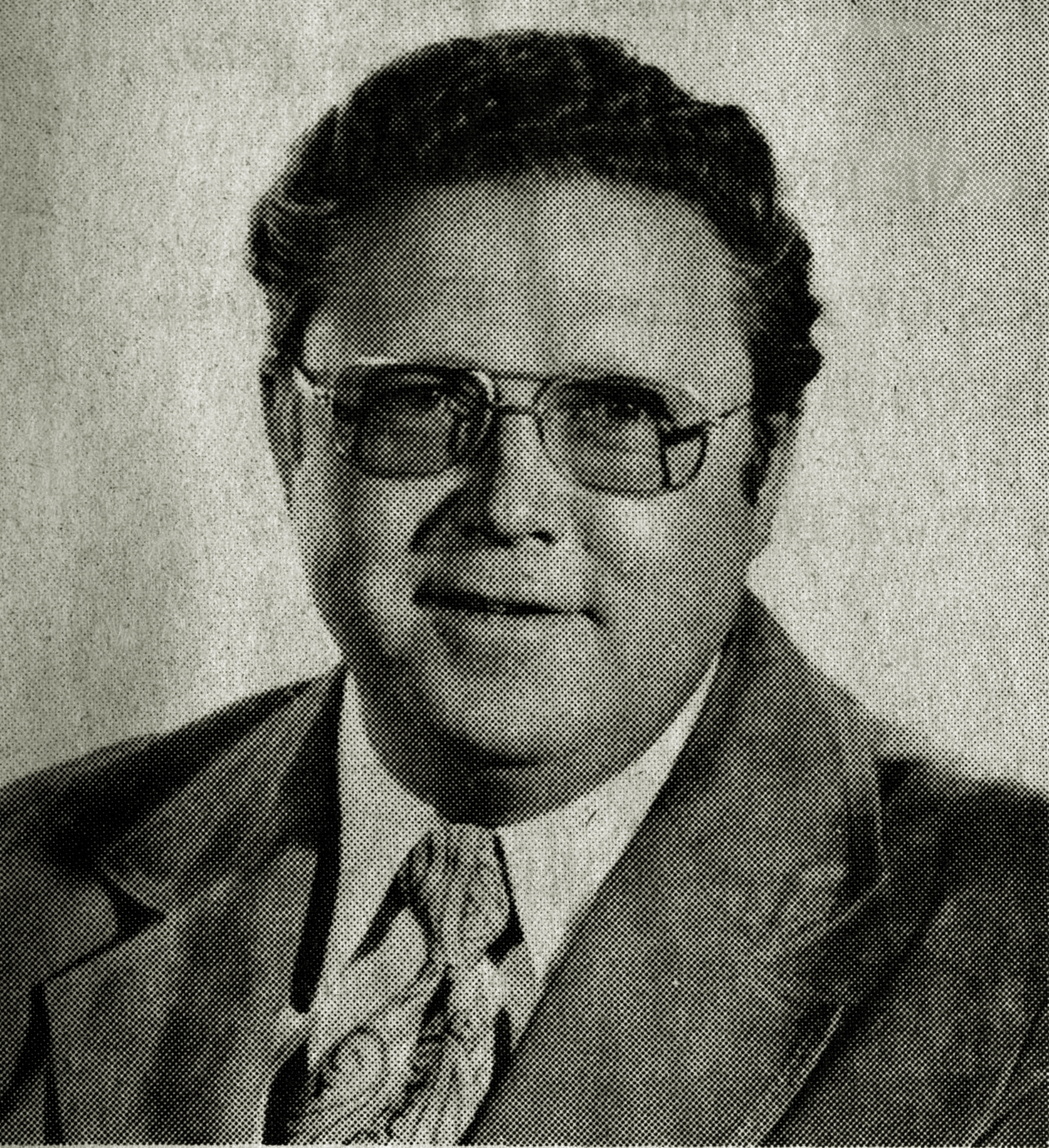
- Wright in 1976

Member of the Alaska House of Representatives from the 16th district
- In office January 23, 1967 – January 27, 1969 Serving with Tury Anderson, Mike Bradner, John Holm, Terry Miller, Ed Orbeck, Don Young
- Preceded by: Multi-member district
- Succeeded by: Multi-member district

Personal details
- Born: Jules Winslow Wright; August 21, 1933 Nenana, Alaska
- Died: January 11, 2022 (aged 88) Wasilla, Alaska
- Party: Republican
- Relatives: Don Wright (brother); Ramy Brooks (grand-nephew)

Jules Winslow Wright (August 21, 1933 – January 11, 2022) was an American businessman and politician from Alaska.

== Early life and private sector ==
Jules Wright was born in Nenana, Alaska, on August 21, 1933, the sixth of seven sons born to Episcopal missionaries Arthur and Myrtle Wright. The siblings became known as the "Alaskan Wright Brothers", an homage to Orville and Wilbur Wright. He grew up in Nenana and attended the local schools. Around the time he entered his teens, his father died, leaving the family business, Wright Truck and Tractor, to his wife and three youngest sons. Jules Wright finished his education in Fairbanks, graduating from Fairbanks High School. He remained in Fairbanks as a trucker for two years before serving in the United States Army. During his military service, Wright was stationed in Fairbanks. After leaving the army, Wright ran a construction business with his brothers, then started another company, Tundra Contracting, in 1966. Subsequently, he was involved in the mining industry for a decade, then built and operated the Manley Hot Springs resort for eight years. By 1993, Wright was an employment rights officer for the Tanana Chiefs Conference.

== Political career ==
Wright became involved with the Fairbanks Native Association around 1963, and served as its president before his election to the Alaska House of Representatives. As the leader of the association, Wright helped develop and present a proposal regarding dormitories for Alaskan Native children to the Alaska Legislature's Health, Welfare and Education Committee in February 1966, which led to his decision to mount a campaign of his own later that year. His 1966 run for public office was described as a "strong person-to-person" campaign. During his single term as a state representative, Wright was affiliated with the Republican Party and also served on the first convocation of a statewide land claims task force. Wright did not seek reelection to the state house during the 1968 election cycle.

During his tenure, Wright voted against a bill regarding mergers of cities and boroughs that ultimately passed the state house in March 1967. That same month, a bill regarding registration of voters passed the Alaska Senate. Prior to the lower house's vote on the legislation, Wright declared his opposition to it. In April, the state house defeated the voter registration bill, with Wright voting against its passage.

In February 1968, Wright criticized a bill that would define alcoholism as a disease, and protect alcoholics from criminal charges, fearing that its implementation would lead more people to become alcoholics. Later that month, Wright expressed opposition to a bill sponsored by Don Young to establish a statewide grain incentive program.

In 1976, Wright ran for the Alaska Senate as an independent. His campaign was significantly financed by his brother Lawrence Wright, also of Tundra Contracting. The unsuccessful campaign was subject to a fine of $60 for turning its financial report in late.

In 1984, Wright contested an open primary as a Republican candidate from Manley Hot Springs, Alaska, losing his bid to return to the state house.

== Personal life and death ==
Wright married Marge in 1952 and they had three children: sons Robert and Allen, and daughter Julie Anderson. He spent his later years living in Wasilla, Alaska, where he died on January 11, 2022, at the age of 88.
