= Enstrom =

Enstrom or Enström is a Swedish surname. Notable people with the surname include:

== People ==
- Axel Fredrik Enström (1875–1948), Swedish engineer
- Axel Enström (1893–1977), Swedish industrialist
- James Enstrom (born c. 1943), American epidemiologist
- Karin Enström (born 1966), Swedish politician
- Eric Enstrom (1875–1968), Swedish-born American photographer
- Tina Enström (born 1991), Swedish ice hockey player
- Tobias Enström (born 1984), Swedish ice hockey player

== Other uses ==
- Enstrom Helicopter Corporation, makers of several small helicopter designs
- Enstrom Township, Roseau County, Minnesota

== See also ==
- Engström, surnames
- Eneström, surname
