= John Westdahl =

American insurance agent, construction worker, and politician

John L. Westdahl (June 17, 1916 – February 18, 1968) was an American insurance agent, construction worker, and politician.

Westdahl lived in St. Mary's, Kusilvak Census Area, Alaska and was a construction worker and insurance agent. He was a Democrat. Westdahl served in the Alaska House of Representatives from 1967 until his death in 1968. Westdahl was attending a meeting in Anchorage, Alaska about native land claims. He died from natural causes at the Kobuk Motel at Anchorage, Alaska.
