= Yupiit of Andreafski =

Federally recognized Alaska Native tribe

- Alaska Native village
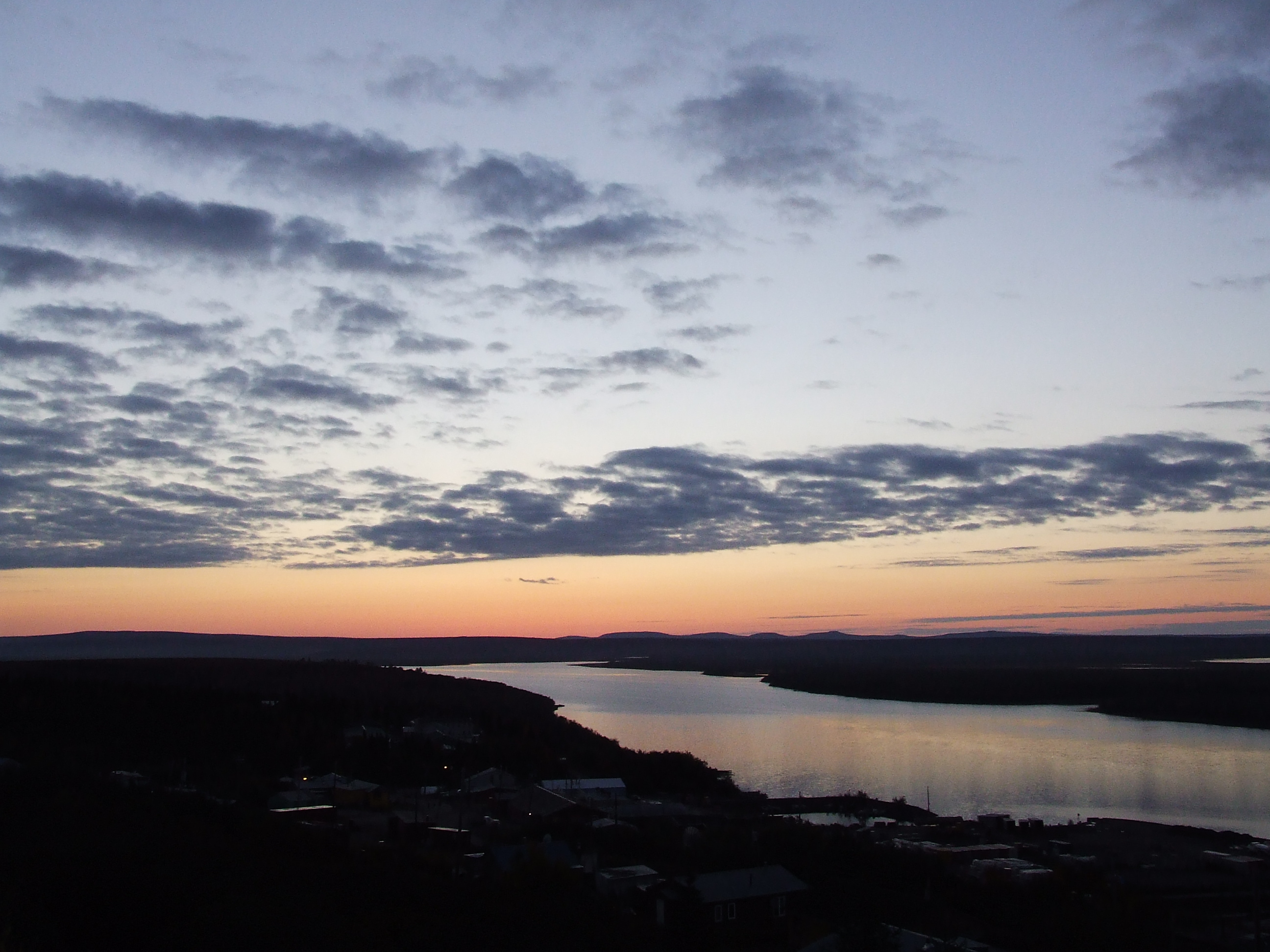
- St. Mary's, Alaska, at sunrise

- Location within Alaska
- Coordinates: 62°03′8.66″N 163°10′21.7″W
- Established: October 4, 1988; 38 years ago
- Capital: St. Mary's, Alaska

Government
  - Type: Representative democracy
  - President: Geraldine Beans Sr.
- Demonym: Koniag Alutiiq
- Time zone: UTC–09:00 (AKST)
  - Summer (DST): UTC–08:00 (AKDT)

The Yupiit of Andreafski is a federally recognized Alaska Native tribe of Yup'ik people. This Alaska Native tribe is headquartered in Saint Mary's, Alaska.

== Government ==
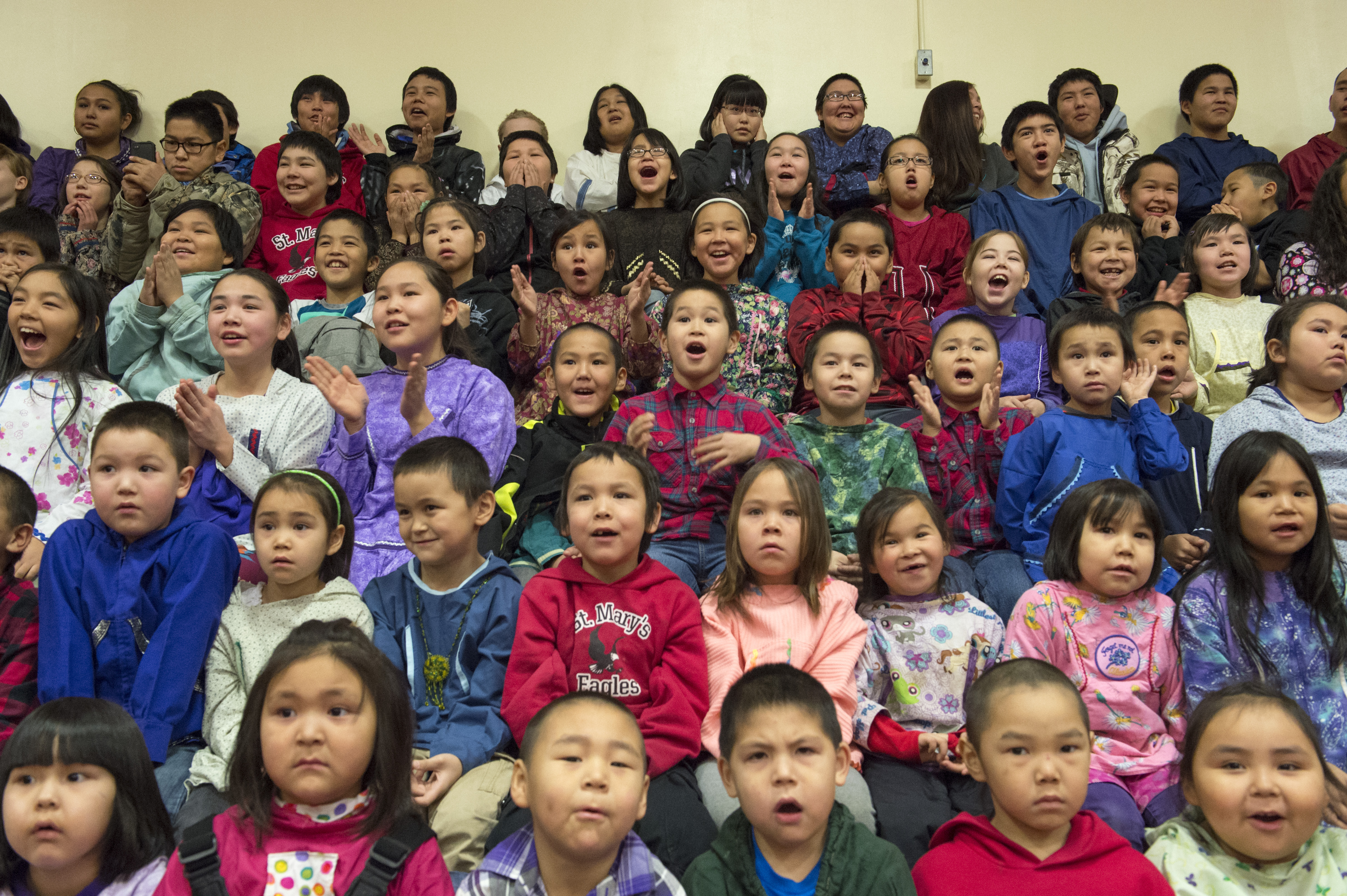
St. Mary's children during "Operation Santa Claus" in 2015

The Yupiit of Andreafski is led by a democratically elected tribal council, and its president is Geraldine Beans Sr. The Alaska Regional Office of the Bureau of Indian Affairs serves the tribe.

They maintain their own tribal court and are a member of the National Congress of American Indians.

== Territory ==
The Yupiit of Andreafski is headquartered in St. Mary's, Alaska (Central Yupik: Negeqliq), which the historical village of Andreafsky merged into. The town is located on the Andreafsky River in the Kusilvak Census Area, Alaska. St Mary's is also the headquarters of the Algaaciq Native Village, another federally recognized Alaska Native tribe.

== Economy ==
Fishing is central to the local economy. The tribe is affiliated with Kuiggpagmiut, Incorporated, and the Calista Corporation, an Alaska Native corporation.

== Language ==
The Yupiit of Andreafski speak English and Central Alaskan Yupʼik.

== Climate change ==
Alaska Natives are already feeling the effects of climate change from increased fires, harsher storms, melting permafrost, erosion along the coasts, and weather patterns shifting. To address these threats, in 2006, 162 Alaska Native tribes, including the Sun'aq Tribe of Kodiak, and corporations working with the Native American Rights Fund, signed a Climate Change resolution calling upon Congress to pass laws to reduce greenhouse gas emissions.

Citizens of the tribe gathered climate data in the Yukon Delta in a 2015 citizen science project.

== See also ==
- Andreafsky Wilderness
