= Justin Parish =

American politician

Member of the Alaska House of Representatives from the 34th district
- In office January 17, 2017 – January 14, 2019
- Preceded by: Cathy Muñoz
- Succeeded by: Andi Story

Personal details
- Born: August 27, 1980 (age 46)
- Party: Democratic

Justin V. Parish (born August 27, 1980) is an American politician who served for one term in the Alaska House of Representatives. His family includes Tlingit people. In 2017, "Representative Justin Parish, a first-time legislator, introduced himself in Tlingit and acknowledged his own Native heritage. His paternal grandmother is a member of the Dog Salmon clan."

== Career ==
Parish was elected to the Alaska House in 2017, defeating Republican incumbent Cathy Muñoz in 2016. After opting not to seek re-election, he endorsed the candidacy of his chief of staff, Juneau Borough Assemblyman Rob Edwardson, to succeed him. The 2018 general election was won by another Democrat, Andi Story. Parish represented Alaska's thirty-fourth district, which encompasses parts of Juneau, Alaska, including the Mendenhall Valley, Auke Bay, Out the road, and Airport areas.
