= Algaaciq Native Village =

Alaska Native village

Algaaciq Native Village (St. Mary's)
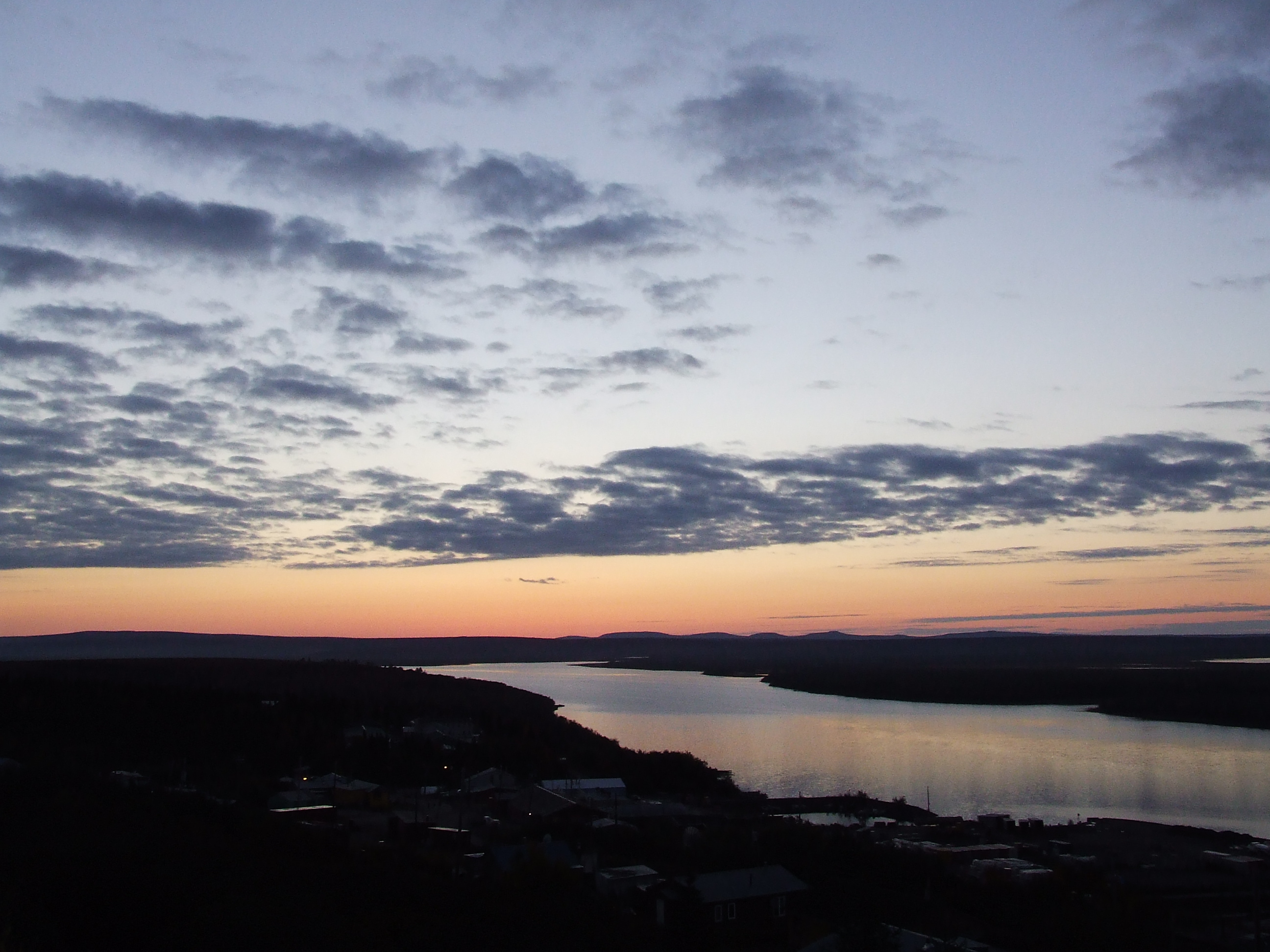
- Sunrise over St. Mary's
- People: Yupiit
- Headquarters: St. Mary's, Alaska

Government
- Chief: Flora Paukan

The Algaaciq Native Village (St. Mary's) is a federally recognized Alaska Native village in St. Mary's in southwest Alaska. They are Yup'ik people with a population of about 500.

Algaaciq is part of the Yukon-Kuskokwim Delta region, and their ANCSA Alaska Native Regional Corporation is the Calista Corporation.

== Government ==
Algaaciq elects a president and tribal council. Their current president is Flora Pauken. They maintain their own tribal court.

== Location ==
The village is located where the Andreafsky and Yukon Rivers meet. St. Mary's is also the headquarters of the Yupiit of Andreafski, another federally recognized Alaska Native tribe of Yup'ik people.

== Demographics ==
In 2010, an individual per capita income was $15,688. A medium household earned $38,000. About 25.7 percent of the adults in village were unemployed. Subsistence hunting and gathering is still economically vital to the community.

== See also ==
- List of Alaska Native tribal entities
- Yup'ik cuisine
- Yup'ik languages
