= Eneström =

Eneström is a surname, likely of Swedish origin. Notable people with the surname include:

- Anna Karin Eneström, Swedish diplomat
- Gustaf Eneström (1852-1923), Swedish mathematician, statistician, and historian

== See also ==
- Enstrom
