= Rie Muñoz =

American artist (1921–2015)

Rie Muñoz (August 17, 1921 – April 6, 2015) was an American artist and Bureau of Indian Affairs educator.

== Early life ==
Muñoz was born Marie Mounier in Van Nuys, California and then moved with her family to the Netherlands as a child. Rie and a sibling were returned to the US by their parents before the outbreak of World War II, where they lived with family friends. The parents intended to follow, but were unable to leave for seven years following the German invasion of the Netherlands. In the US, Muñoz studied art at Washington and Lee University. She visited Juneau, Alaska in 1951 as a visitor, but became enamored of Southeast Alaska and decided to stay.

== Career ==
In Muñoz's first years in Alaska, she worked as a teacher on King Island.

Muñoz's work featured watercolors, and she created prints of Alaska life. Muñoz worked as a writer and cartoonist for the Juneau Empire. She worked as a museum curator, in addition to her work as a full-time artist. Her art has been featured in museums outside of Alaska, including the Frye Art Museum in Seattle. She received the University of Alaska's Honorary Doctorate of Humanities Degree in May of 1999.

== Personal life ==
In 1957, Muñoz and her husband, Juan, spent a year away from Alaska. Juan and Rie Muñoz lived at the time on Mercer Island, Washington, where Juan was employed as a geologist. The couple had a home near the East Channel Bridge. The couple later returned to Alaska. After Juan's death, Muñoz

Juan and Rie Muñoz had two sons, Felipe and Juan, Jr. Felipe died from kidney cancer as a child. Juan and Rie divorced in 1963, and Rie subsequently settled in Juneau, where she spent the rest of her life.

Her daughter-in-law is Alaska State Representative Cathy Muñoz who served from 2009-2017. In 2015, Rie Muñoz died in Juneau, Alaska of a stroke, aged 93.

In 2024, Muñoz's son digitized photographs her husband had taken during the couple's time on King Island and donated the originals to the Katirvik Cultural Center.

== Legacy ==
Muñoz's work is featured on Alaska's Heirloom Birth Certificate.
