= 1987 Anchorage mayoral election =

- October 12, 1987 (first round); November 3, 1987 (runoff)
- Turnout: 52.46% (runoff)
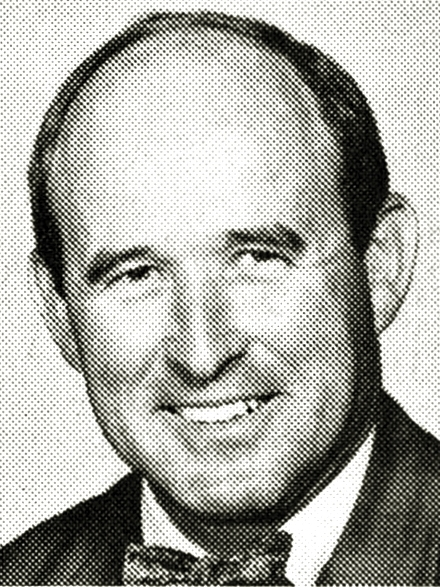

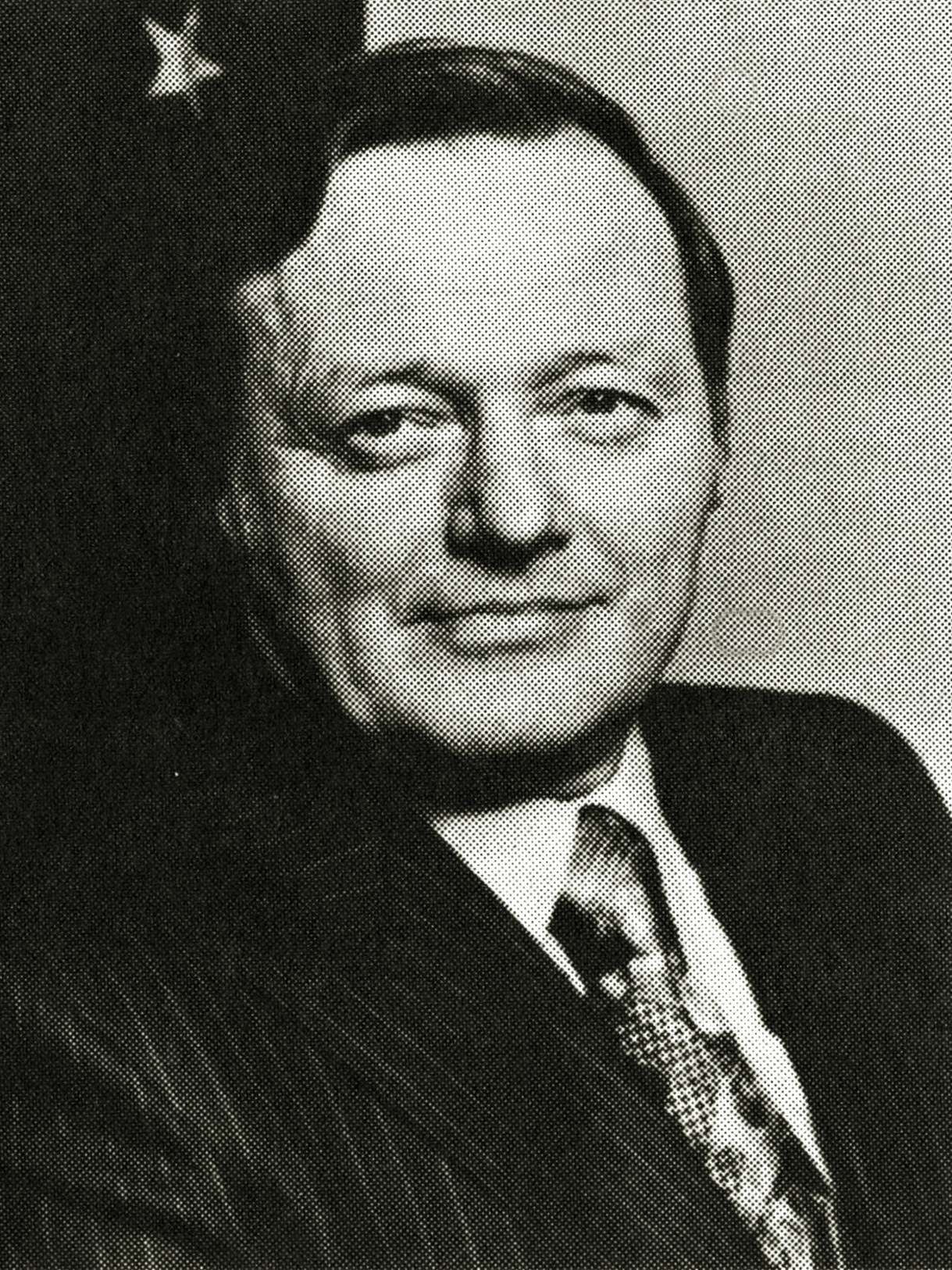
Candidate	Tom Fink	Dave Walsh	H. A. "Red" Boucher
First-round vote	15,666	18,200	12,346
First-round percentage	30.30%	35.20%	23.88%
Second-round vote	30,962	23,214
Second-round percentage	57.15%	42.85%
Candidate	Larry Baker
First-round vote	3,342
First-round percentage	6.46%
Mayor before election
Tony Knowles
Democratic
Elected mayor
Tom Fink
Republican

The 1987 Anchorage mayoral election was held on October 12 and November 3, 1987, to elect the mayor of Anchorage, Alaska. It saw election of Tom Fink.

Incumbent mayor Tony Knowles was term-limited.

Since at no candidate received 40% of the vote in the first round (which at least one candidate was required to obtain to avoid a runoff), a runoff was held between the top-two finishers of the first round.

== Candidates ==
- Larry Baker
- H. A. "Red" Boucher, member of the Alaska House of Representatives, former Lieutenant Governor of Alaska, and former mayor of Fairbanks, Alaska
- Tom Fink, former Speaker of the Alaska House of Representatives and Republican nominee for governor of Alaska in 1982
- Bud Knox
- Paul Honeman
- Tom O'Shaughnessy
- J. E. Stonerock
- Mike "Mafia Mike" Von Gnatensky
- Dave Walsh

== Results ==
=== First round ===
1987 Anchorage mayoral general election
Party	Candidate	Votes	%
Nonpartisan	Dave Walsh	18,200	35.20
Nonpartisan	Tom Fink	15,666	30.30
Nonpartisan	H. A. "Red" Boucher	12,346	23.88
Nonpartisan	Larry Baker	3,342	6.46
Nonpartisan	Mike "Mafia Mike" Von Gnatensky	1,725	3.34
Nonpartisan	Paul Honeman	191	0.37
Nonpartisan	J. E. Stonerock	107	0.21
Nonpartisan	Bud Knox	95	0.18
Nonpartisan	Tom O'Shaughnessy	40	0.08
Total votes		51,712	100

=== Runoff ===
1987 Anchorage mayoral runoff election
Party	Candidate	Votes	%
Nonpartisan	Tom Fink	30,962	57.15
Nonpartisan	Dave Walsh	23,214	42.85
Total votes		54,176	100
