= 1997 Anchorage mayoral election =

- April 15, 1997
- Turnout: 39.66%

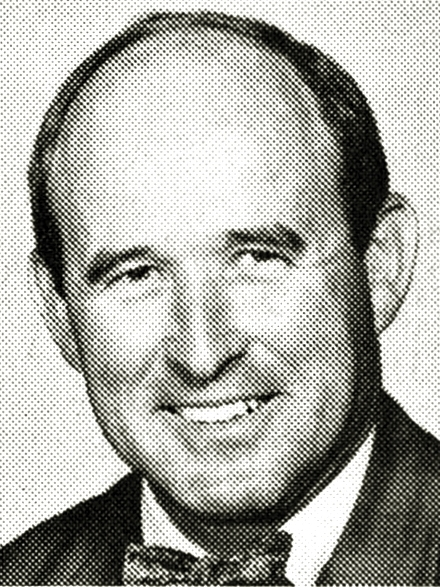
Candidate	Rick Mystrom	Tom Fink
Popular vote	32,569	26,262
Percentage	53.39%	43.05%
Mayor before election
Rick Mystrom
Republican
Elected mayor
Rick Mystrom
Republican

The 1997 Anchorage mayoral election was held on April 15, 1997, to elect the mayor of Anchorage, Alaska. It saw the reelection of current mayor Rick Mystrom.

Since at least one candidate (in this instance, two candidates) obtained 40% of the vote, no runoff was needed.

== Candidates ==
- Jason Bean
- Alan B. Carraway
- Thomas M. Elam
- Robert "Robert F." Felder
- Tom Fink, former mayor
- Georgia Mario
- Andree McLeod
- Rick Mystrom, incumbent mayor
- Otto A. Schneider
- William J. "Bill" Terbeck

== Results ==
1997 Anchorage mayoral election
Party	Candidate	Votes	%
Nonpartisan	Rick Mystrom (incumbent)	32,569	53.39
Nonpartisan	Tom Fink	26,262	43.05
Nonpartisan	Georgia Mario	495	0.81
Nonpartisan	Andree McLeod	485	0.80
Nonpartisan	Jason Bean	264	0.43
Nonpartisan	Alan B. Carraway	254	0.42
Nonpartisan	Thomas M. Elam	179	0.21
Nonpartisan	Robert "Robert F." Felder	126	0.21
Nonpartisan	William J. "Bill" Terbeck	89	0.15
Write-in	Write-in	149	0.24
Turnout		70,677	39.66
