= Moses Paukan =

American politician

Representative of the Alaska House of Representatives
- In office 1967–1970

Personal details
- Born: September 29, 1933 Fish Valley, Alaska Territory
- Died: April 16, 2017 (aged 83)
- Party: Democratic Party
- Occupation: Businessman and Politician

Moses Patrick Paukan, Sr. (September 29, 1933 – April 16, 2017) was an American businessman and politician.

Born in Fish Valley, Alaska Territory, Paukan went to school in Akulurak, Alaska and was a Yupik. He settled in Saint Mary's, Alaska and was a businessman and mechanic. Paukan served on the St. Mary's City Council and as mayor. He also served on the school board. From 1967 to 1970, Paukan served in the Alaska House of Representatives and was a Democrat.
