= Adams family political line =

The Adams family is a family of politicians from the United States. Below is a list of members.

- Samuel Adams (1722–1803), delegate to the Massachusetts Constitutional Convention 1779 1788, Massachusetts State Senator 1781, candidate for U.S. Representative from Massachusetts 1788, Lieutenant Governor of Massachusetts 1789–94, Governor of Massachusetts 1793–97. Second cousin of John Adams.
- John Adams (1735–1826), Delegate to the Continental Congress from Massachusetts 1774–78, U.S. Minister to the Netherlands 1781–88, U.S. Minister to Great Britain 1785–88, Vice President of the United States 1789–97, President of the United States 1797–1801, delegate to the Massachusetts Constitutional Convention 1820. Second cousin of Samuel Adams.
- Joshua Johnson, U.S. Consul to London, England, 1790–97. Father-in-law of John Quincy Adams.
  - Joseph Allen (1749–1827), delegate to the Massachusetts Constitutional Convention 1788, U.S. Representative from Massachusetts 1810–11. Nephew of Samuel Adams.
  - John Quincy Adams (1767–1848), U.S. Minister to the Netherlands 1794–97, U.S. Minister to Prussia 1797–1801, U.S. Minister to Russia 1809–14, U.S. Minister to Great Britain 1815–17, Massachusetts State Senator 1802, U.S. Senator from Massachusetts 1803–08, U.S. Secretary of State 1817–25, President of the United States 1825–29, U.S. Representative from Massachusetts 1831–48, candidate for Governor of Massachusetts 1833. Son of John Adams.
  - John Pope (1770–1845), Kentucky State Representative 1802 1806, U.S. Senator from Kentucky 1807–13, Kentucky Secretary of State 1816–19, Governor of Arkansas Territory 1829–35, U.S. Representative from Kentucky 1837–43. Brother-in-law of John Quincy Adams.
  - Benjamin Crowninshield (1773–1851), Massachusetts State Representative 1811, Massachusetts State Senator 1812, U.S. Secretary of the Navy 1815–18, U.S. Representative from Massachusetts 1823–31. Grandfather-in-law of John Quincy Adams.
    - William S. Smith (1755–1816), U.S. Representative from New York 1813–15. Son-in-law of John Adams.
    - William Cranch (1769–1855), Judge of U.S. Court of Appeals in the District of Columbia 1801 1806. Nephew by marriage of John Adams.
    - Charles Allen (1797–1869), Massachusetts State Representative 1830 1833–35 1840, Massachusetts State Senator 1836–37, Judge of Court of Common Pleas in Massachusetts 1842–45, U.S. Representative from Massachusetts 1849–53, delegate to the Republican National Convention 1856, Superior Court Judge in Massachusetts 1859–67. Son of Joseph Allen.
    - George Washington Adams (1801–1828), Massachusetts State Representative 1826. Son of John Quincy Adams.
    - Edward Everett (1794–1865), U.S. Representative from Massachusetts 1825–35, Governor of Massachusetts 1836–40, U.S. Minister to Great Britain 1841–45, U.S. Secretary of State 1852–53, U.S. Senator from Massachusetts 1853–54, candidate for Vice President of the United States 1860. Brother-in-law of Charles Francis Adams, Sr..
    - Charles Francis Adams, Sr. (1807–1886), Massachusetts State Representative 1831, Massachusetts State Senator 1835–40, candidate for Vice President of the United States 1848, delegate to the Republican National Convention 1856, U.S. Representative from Massachusetts 1859–61, U.S. Minister to Great Britain 1861–68, candidate for Governor of Massachusetts 1876. Son of John Quincy Adams.
      - Alfred Cumming (1802–1873), Mayor of Augusta, Georgia, 1836; Governor of Utah Territory 1858–61. Great-grandson-in-law of Samuel Adams.
      - John Quincy Adams (1833–1894), Massachusetts State Representative 1866 1869, candidate for Governor of Massachusetts 1867 1868 1869 1870 1871 1879, candidate for Vice President of the United States 1872. Son of Charles Francis Adams, Sr..
      - William C. Lovering (1835–1910), Massachusetts State Senator 1874–75, delegate to the Republican National Convention 1880, U.S. Representative from Massachusetts 1897–1910. Father-in-law of Charles Francis Adams III.
      - William Everett (1839–1910), U.S. Representative from Massachusetts 1893–95, candidate for Governor of Massachusetts 1897. Son of Edward Everett.
      - Brooks Adams (1848–1927), delegate to the Massachusetts Constitutional Convention 1917. Son of Charles Francis Adams, Sr..
      - Henry Cabot Lodge (1850–1924), Massachusetts State Representative 1880, U.S. Representative from Massachusetts 1887–93, U.S. Senator from Massachusetts 1893–1924, delegate to the Republican National Convention 1924. Brother-in-law of Brooks Adams.
        - Charles Francis Adams III (1866–1954), Mayor of Quincy, Massachusetts, 1896–97; delegate to the Massachusetts Constitutional Convention 1917; U.S. Secretary of the Navy 1929–33. Son of John Quincy Adams.
          - Thomas B. Adams (1910–1997), candidate for Democratic nominations for U.S. Senate from Massachusetts 1966, delegate to the Democratic National Convention 1972. Great-grandson of Charles Francis Adams, Sr..
            - William R. Merriam (1849–1931), Minnesota State Representative 1883 1887, Governor of Minnesota 1889–93, delegate to the Republican National Convention 1896. Descendant of John Adams.
            - Eugene H. Nickerson (1918–2002), delegate to the Democratic National Convention 1972, Judge of U.S. District Court 1977. Descendant of John Adams.

== See also ==
- Adams political family
