= Robert A. Emmitt =

American farmer, politician, and postmaster

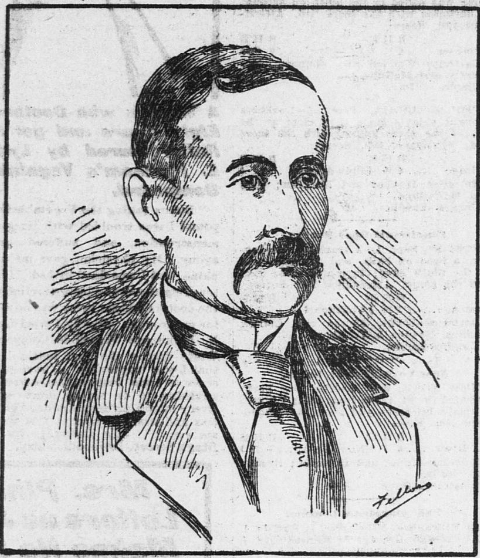
- State Representative R. A. Emmitt, 1900

Member of the Oregon House of Representatives from the 21nd district
- In office 1901–1904
- Preceded by: William A. Massingill
- Succeeded by: John S. Shook

Personal details
- Born: May 29, 1850 Logan County, Illinois, US
- Died: May 2, 1937 (aged 86) Klamath Falls, Oregon, US
- Party: Republican
- Spouse: Flora Leslie
- Profession: Farmer

Robert Albert Emmitt (May 29, 1850 – May 2, 1937), also known as Bob Emmitt or Judge Emmitt, was an American farmer and politician. He served two two-year terms in the Oregon House of Representatives as a Republican legislator, representing a large rural district in eastern Oregon. He was also a justice of the peace in Klamath County and later the postmaster and justice of the peace for the city of Klamath Falls, Oregon.

== Early life ==
Emmitt was born on May 29, 1850, in Logan County, Illinois. He was the son of John Emmitt and Caroline (Thompson) Emmitt. His father was born in Pennsylvania and his mother was from Tennessee; both had Irish ancestry. In 1852, his family moved to the Oregon Territory, travelling by wagon along the Oregon Trail.

The family settled in Douglas County, where Emmitt's father secured a 320-acre (130 ha) Donation Land Grant. The land claim was in Coles Valley, 5 miles (8.0 km) northwest of Roseburg. His father built a 14-by-16-foot (4.3 m × 4.9 m) one-room log cabin on the bank of the Umpqua River. The family lived in the cabin for 14 years until 1866, when they built a better home on the site. As a boy, Emmitt attended a small rural school in Coles Valley. Emmitt's father was well known throughout Douglas County, serving a four-year term in the Oregon State Senate from 1884 to 1888.

As a young man, Emmitt taught school while he learned the carpentry trade. He married Flora Leslie on May 6, 1875. Flora was born in Fountain County, Indiana and came to Oregon with her mother and sister in 1870, settling in Roseburg. Together, Emmitt and his wife had five daughters.

== Pioneer farmer ==
Shortly after getting married, the couple moved to Klamath County, which at that time was still part of Jackson County. To get to their new home, they travelled overland across the Cascade Mountains with Emmitt driving their small cattle herd while his wife led a pack horse that carried their personal possessions and household goods. When he arrived, Emmitt claimed 160 acres (65 ha) of land along the Klamath River, 5 miles (8.0 km) southwest of Klamath Falls (then known as Linkville). The family lived in a log cabin with a dirt floor for five years, while Emmitt farmed his land claim.

In 1880, Emmitt sold the property and bought another parcel near Keno, 12 miles (19 km) southwest of Klamath Falls. He built a large modern home and expanded his farming operation. Emmitt grew the first wheat crop produced in Klamath County on his Keno farm. Over the next few years, he added to his land holdings until he owned 1,160 acres (470 ha) in three large tracts, where he grew wheat and grazed livestock.

Emmitt was a dedicated Republican who served as justice of the peace for Klamath County's Plevna Precinct for over twenty years. In 1882, he ran for county sheriff, but lost by 90 votes. Two years later, he was elected to a two-year term as Klamath County commissioner. In 1898, he was elected to the Oregon state board of equalization from the first judicial district by a 600-vote margin. The board was responsible for adjudicating property taxes appeals from citizens. However, the position was abolished before he took office.

Emmitt was also active in several fraternal organizations. He was a member of the local Ancient Order of United Workmen lodge and a member of the Independent Order of Odd Fellows.

== State legislator ==
In 1900, Emmitt decided to run for a District 21 seat in the Oregon State House of Representatives. District 21 represented four large eastern Oregon counties, Crook (which at that time included modern-day Deschutes and Jefferson counties), Klamath, Lake, and Wasco (which included Hood River County at that time). District 21 had three House seats so major political parties could nominate up to three candidates. Emmitt was nominated as one of the Republican Party's candidates. He was also endorsed for state representative by local newspapers from across the district including The Dalles Chronicle, Ashland Tidings, and the Lake County Examiner.

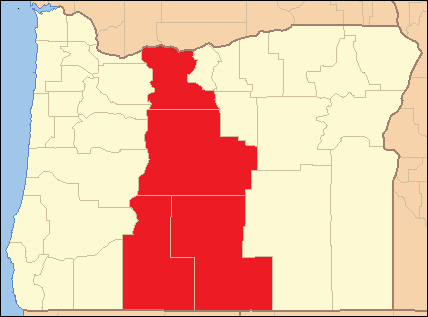
Oregon House District 22, 1901–1904

In the general election, Emmitt was elected as one of three state representatives from District 21. He finished third in a field of eight candidates behind fellow Republicans T. H. McGreer and A. S. Roberts. McGreer received the most votes with 1,292, followed Roberts with 1,290, and then Emmitt with 1,233 votes. The other candidates included three from the Fusion Party, Harry C. Liebe who got 1,112 votes, G. Springer with 807 votes, and George T. Baldwin with 693 votes. The remaining two candidates represented the Progressive Party, Josiah Burlingame received 126 votes and O. V. White got 122 votes.

Emmitt took his District 21 seat in the Oregon House of Representatives on January 14, 1901. During the session, he was appointed chairman of the House claims committee. He served throughout the session which ended on March 4.

In 1902, Emmitt ran for reelection in District 21. The district still had three seats, so the Republican Party filled out its ticket with two other candidates, Nathan Whealdon of The Dalles and J. N. Burgess of Antelope. In addition, the state's Democratic Party nominated three candidates for the District 21 seats, Earl Sanders, L. E. Morse, and P. B. Doak. The Republicans won all three of the District 21 seats in the 1902 general election. The final count was led by Whealdon with 2,671 votes followed by Burgess with 1,403 and Emmitt with 1,346. The three Democrats finished well behind with Sanders receiving 1,172 votes, Morse with 1,074, and Doak getting only 851.

The 1903 regular legislative session began on January 12 with Emmitt representing District 21 in the Oregon House. As the session was getting organized, Emmitt was appointed to the credentials committee. During the session, he served as chairman of the claims committee and was also a member of the fisheries and game committee and the irrigation committee. In addition, he was appointed to a special House committee chartered to audit the Oregon State Treasurer's office. The session completed its business and adjourned on February 20. Later that year, Emmitt represented District 21 during a special legislative session that began on December 21 and ended four days later.

== Later life ==
After leaving the state legislature, Emmitt returned to his farm in Klamath County. However, he remained active in public affairs. In 1906, he ran for county judge in Klamath County, but was defeated. In 1907, he leased out his farmland to tenants and moved to Klamath Falls. A year later, he was appointed Klamath Falls postmaster. In that position, he became the first postmaster in Oregon to be designated as a postal banker by the United States Postal Service. He remained postmaster until 1912, when he was appointed Klamath County's road master, a position he held for many years. As road master, he supervised the construction and maintenance of the county's expanding road network.

Over the years, Emmitt continued to work for the Republican party, serving as chairman of Klamath County Republican Party's central committee beginning in 1912. That same year, he supported William Howard Taft for President of the United States and campaigned for local candidates as well. In addition, he was president of the Good Government League of Klamath County during the early 1920s.

In 1922, he was elected justice of the peace for the city of Klamath Falls. During his two-year term, he handled 982 cases. This included 759 criminal cases and 223 civil cases. In 1924, he ran for reelection, but was defeated by 90 votes in a four-way race. However, he was appointed as acting justice of the peace in late 1925 after the incumbent became seriously ill and could not continue in the position. After the incumbent's death, Emmitt was officially appointed to fill the unexpired justice of the peace term. In the same month, Emmitt announced he would run for re-election as an independent candidate. He was defeated in the 1926 general election by the Republican candidate who received 1,982 votes to Emmitt's 1,268.

After leaving the justice of the peace position, Emmitt continued to actively follow community and world events. During his latter years, he wrote a number of articles and commentaries for the two local newspapers. His wife Flora died in 1931, after an extended illness. Emmitt and his wife had been married for 56 years at the time of her death.

In 1936, Emmitt had a heart attack, but recovered. He died in his sleep at home in Klamath Falls on May 2, 1937. Emmitt's funeral services were held at the local Independent Order of Odd Fellows hall. He was buried in a family plot at the Odd Fellows cemetery in Klamath Falls.
