= John Emmitt =

American politician

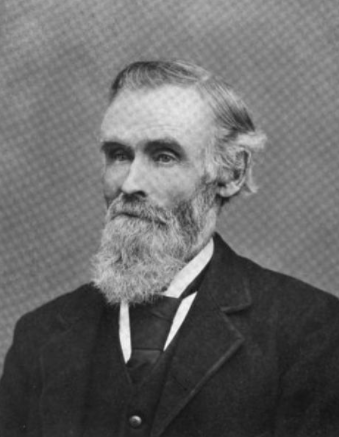
- State Senator John Emmitt, c. 1885

Member of the Oregon Senate from the 7th district
- In office January 12, 1885 – December 31, 1888
- Preceded by: Daniel W. Stearns
- Succeeded by: James C. Fullerton
- Constituency: Douglas County, Oregon

Personal details
- Born: October 12, 1825 Northumberland County, Pennsylvania
- Died: December 6, 1901 (aged 76) Douglas County, Oregon
- Party: Republican
- Spouse: Caroline Thompson
- Profession: Farmer

John Emmitt (October 12, 1825 – December 6, 1901) was an American pioneer farmer and state legislator from the state of Oregon. He served four years in the Oregon State Senate as a Republican, representing a large rural district in western Oregon. Prior to being elected to the state senate, he was justice of the peace in Douglas County, Oregon. Later, Emmitt was appointed to the board of regents for Oregon Agricultural College (now Oregon State University).

== Early life ==
Emmitt was born on October 12, 1825, near the Susquehanna River in Northumberland County, Pennsylvania. He was the son of Samuel and Catharine Emmitt. When he was fourteen, he moved with his parents to Logan County, Illinois, where he attended a public school.

Emmitt married Caroline Thompson on September 17, 1847. She was a native of Tennessee, who moved to Logan County with her family in 1831. Together, they had twelve children. The first three were born in Illinois before 1851.

In the spring of 1852, Emmitt and his wife headed for the Oregon Territory with their three young children. It was a six-month journey, travelling by wagon along the Oregon Trail. They brought five pair of oxen to pull their wagon plus two cows and a horse. Emmitt and all three children got sick with cholera along the way. Emmitt and his youngest child, Robert A. Emmitt, recovered, but his two older children died and were buried along the route.

== Pioneer farmer ==
When Emmitt arrived in Oregon in 1852, he settled along the Umpqua River in Douglas County, where he secured a 320-acre (130 ha) Donation Land Grant. The land claim was in Coles Valley, 5 miles (8.0 km) northwest of Roseburg. He built a 14-by-16-foot (4.3 by 4.9 m) one-room log cabin on his property. The Emmitt family lived in their rustic log cabin for the next 14 years. It was a difficult life. For example, it was two years before the family acquired a cook stove for the cabin and it was nine years before they had a clock in their home.

In 1861, the Umpqua River overflowed its banks and flooded the Emmitt farm. The raising water forced the family to evacuate to higher ground. When the flood reached its high-water mark, the Emmitt family's cabin floor was covered with 3 feet (1 m) of water. After the water receded, the family moved back into their cabin. Because of the flood, Emmitt decided to build a new more modern home on higher ground. However, the new house was not finished until 1866. Emmitt and his wife lived in the new house for the rest of their lives.

Emmitt was well known throughout Douglas County, where his neighbors elected him as the local justice of the peace. He also played an active role in the development of the county's road network and school system.

Emmitt joined the Republican Party when it was first formed before the American Civil War and remained a dedicated Republican for the rest of his life. In 1880, Emmitt was a Douglas County delegate at the Oregon Republican convention held in Portland. Two years later, he once again represented Douglas County at the state Republican convention.

== State legislator ==
In 1884, Emmitt decided to run for the District 7 seat in the Oregon State Senate. District 7 represented Douglas County, a large rural county in western Oregon. At that time, Douglas County had two senate seats so major political parties could nominate two candidates for the seats. The Republican Party nominated Emmitt and John H. Shupe for the two Douglas County senate seats. The Democratic Party nominated James Chenowith and W. F. Owens for the District 7 seats.

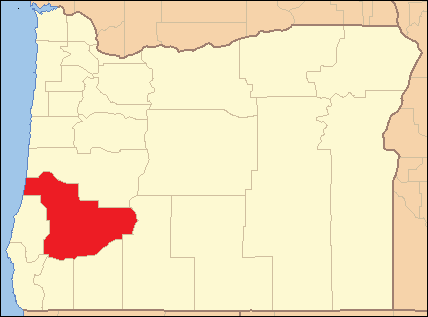
Douglas County Senate District 7, 1884–1888

In the 1884 general election, Emmitt and Shupe were elected to fill the two Douglas County senate seats. Shupe received 1,276 votes with Emmitt close behind with 1,212 while Chenowith got 1,105 and Owen finished last with 1,054.

Emmitt took his place in the Oregon state senate on January 12, 1885. That was the beginning of the thirteenth regular session of Oregon's legislative assembly. During the session, Emmitt served as chairman of the senate counties committee. Among other things, his committee recommended an adjustment to the boundary between Lane and Douglas counties. He was also a member of the agriculture and elections committees. He served through the end of the session, which adjourned on February 21. Later that year, he returned to the capital for a special session that began on November 11. The special session lasted almost two weeks, ending on November 24.

Since state senators served a four-year term, Emmitt did not have to run for re-election prior to the 1887 session. That session began on January 10 of that year. During the 1887 legislative session, he was appointed to the corporations and elections committees. The state's fourteenth regular legislative session ended on February 18, 1887. Emmitt's state senate term expired at the end of 1888 without any additional legislative meetings.

== Later life ==
After the 1885 special legislature session ended, Republican governor Zenas F. Moody appointed Emmitt to the board of regents for Oregon Agricultural College. He remained on the board for the next nine years, serving through Governor Moody's term in office and continuing to serve after being reappointed by Democratic governor Sylvester Pennoyer. He also stayed active in Republican politics. For example, Emmet represented Douglas County at the state's Republican convention in 1890.

Emmitt continued to farm and raise livestock for the rest of his life. Over the years, he added to his property until he owned 820 acres (330 ha) of farm and pasture land. The entire property was improved for efficient farming. It was always well cultivated, resulting in abundant crop production. Emmitt also raised considerable livestock on his land.

By 1901, Emmitt had become feeble due to old age and eventually fell ill. He died at his home in Coles Valley on December 6, 1901, at the age of 75. He was survived by his wife and eight of their children. His funeral was held on December 9, 1901. After the funeral, Emmitt was buried in the Coles Valley Cemetery in Douglas County, Oregon. His wife, Caroline, died at their Coles Valley home in 1907.
