= Cathy Muñoz =

American politician (born 1964)

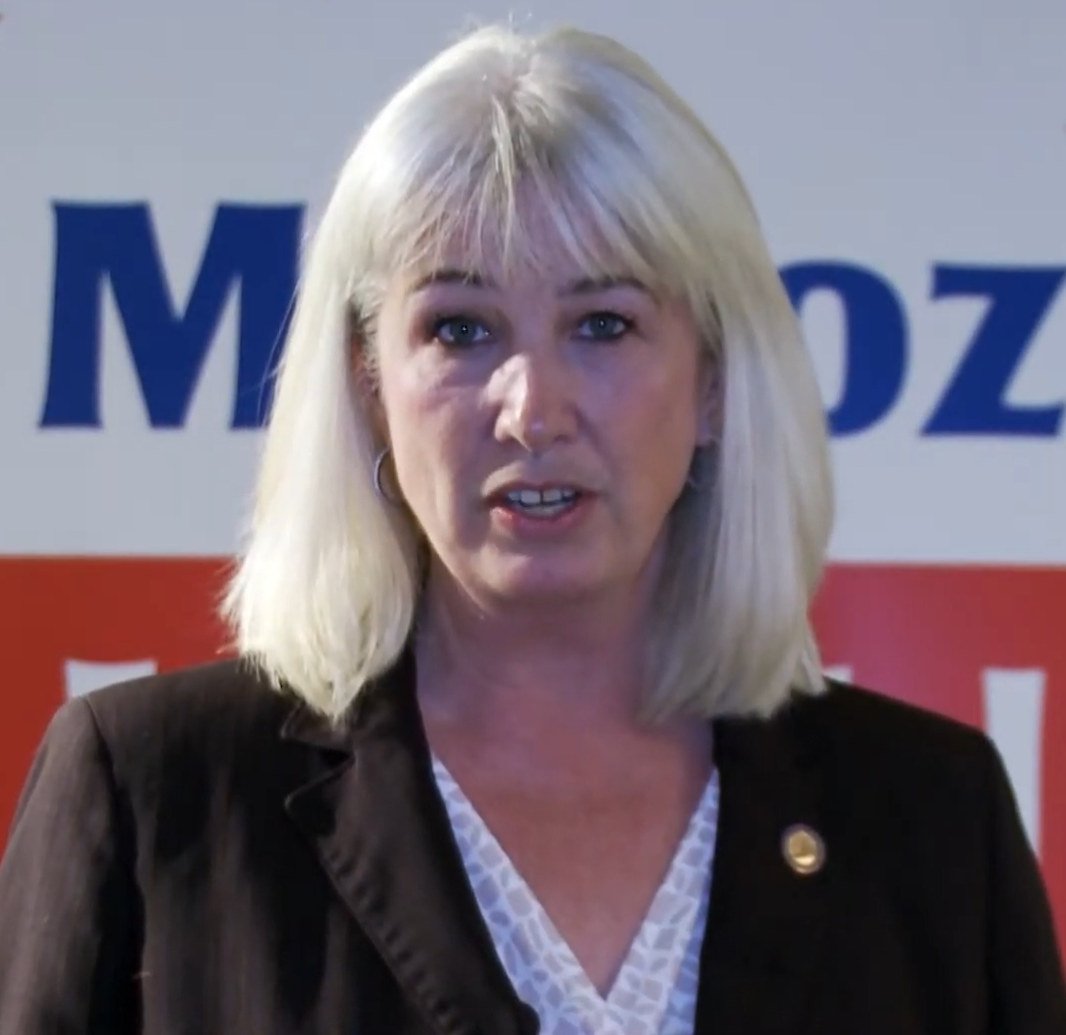
- Cathy Muñoz campaigning for reelection in 2016.

Member of the Alaska House of Representatives from the 34th district
- In office January 19, 2009 – January 16, 2017
- Preceded by: Andrea Doll
- Succeeded by: Justin Parish

Personal details
- Born: Catherine Norah Engstrom; June 23, 1964 (age 62) Juneau, Alaska, U.S.
- Party: Republican
- Spouse: Juan
- Relations: Elton Engstrom Jr. (father); Elton Engstrom Sr. (grandfather); Thelma Engstrom (grandmother); Rie Muñoz (mother-in-law)
- Children: 2
- Education: University of the Pacific U.S.
- Occupation: Business owner

Catherine Norah Muñoz (née Engstrom; born June 23, 1964) is an American politician who was a Republican member of the Alaska House of Representatives, who from 2009 to 2017 represented the 34th District. She was appointed by Governor Michael J. Dunleavy in 2018 to serve as the Deputy Commissioner of the Alaska Department of Labor and Workforce Development.

Muñoz was a third-generation member of the Alaska Legislature. Her father served in the Alaska House and Senate, her grandfather as the mayor of Douglas, Alaska and in the Territorial and State Senates, and her grandmother served in the Territorial House.

== Early life and career ==
Muñoz graduated from Juneau-Douglas High School, and received a Bachelor of Arts in political science from the University of the Pacific (United States). She was crowned Miss Juneau in 1982.

As a teenager she worked aboard fishing scows and in fish processing plants on the "slime line." Cathy worked in the Ad Lib art gallery in downtown Juneau which she opened with her mother Sally, until she decided to run for the legislature in 2008.

Muñoz has been a small business owner since 1988.

Muñoz served three terms in the Juneau Assembly.

== House of Representatives ==
In 2008, Muñoz beat Democratic incumbent Andrea Doll in District 4, 50.6% to 48.4%.

In the legislature, she served as Co-Chair of the Community and Regional Affairs Committee, Vice-Chair of the Education Committee, and served for two terms on the House Finance Committee. She served as Co-Chair of the Community & Regional Affairs Committee and Vice-Chair of the Education Committee.

Muñoz faced no opposition in 2010 and 2012. In 2014, Democrat George McGuan ran against Muñoz in district 34. Muñoz won 62.4% of the votes in the Republican district. In 2016, Democrat Justin Parish beat her 50.9% to 48.5%

== Sponsored legislation ==
Muñoz’s legislative work focused on support for small business, public education and the environment. She sponsored legislation offering tax incentives for contributions to public education, as well as new housing development. She authored legislation strengthening Alaska’s Oil Spill and Response capabilities, and carried legislation for Governor Sean Parnell which committed $3 billion to pay down Alaska’s retirement debt.

Gun Control: Muñoz supported pro second amendment legislation.

Equal Rights: Muñoz voted for same-sex marriage and supported the inclusion of gender identity in Alaska's anti-discrimination laws.

== Personal life ==
Muñoz is a fourth-generation Alaskan. She and her husband Juan have two children. Her mother-in-law was the famed Alaskan artist Rie Muñoz.

Muñoz is Episcopalian.

Muñoz's father, Elton Engstrom, served in the state House from 1965-1966 and the Senate from 1967-1971. Her grandfather, Elton Engstrom Sr., was a territorial and state senator who died in office in 1963. Her grandmother, Thelma Engstrom served in the 18th Territorial Legislature in 1947.
