= Victor Engström =

Swedish bandy player

Personal information
- Full name: Victor Engström
- Born: 25 April 1989
- Died: 1 July 2013 (aged 24)
- Playing position: Midfielder

Youth career
- Västerås

Senior career*
Years	Team	Apps^{†}	(Gls)^{†}
2006–2013	Västerås		
- * Senior club appearances and goals counted for the domestic league only. † Appearances (Goals).

Victor Engström (25 April 1989 – 1 July 2013) was a Swedish bandy player who played for Västerås SK as a midfielder or forward. Engström was a youth product of Västerås SK and made his first team debut in the 2006–07 season. Engström also played for the Sweden U19 team that won the U19 Nordic Under-19 Bandy Championship 2007, where he scored one goal against Finland. On 1 July 2013, Engström died of liver cancer, 24 years old.
