= Tom Fink =

American politician (1928–2021)

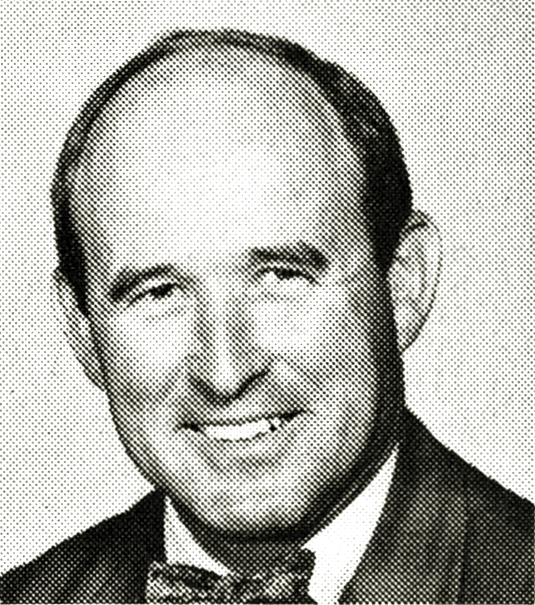
- Fink in 1975

Member of the Federal Retirement Thrift Investment Board
- In office 1997–2010

Mayor of Anchorage
- In office July 1, 1987 – July 1, 1994
- Preceded by: Tony Knowles
- Succeeded by: Rick Mystrom

7th Speaker of the Alaska House of Representatives
- In office 1973–1975
- Preceded by: Gene Guess
- Succeeded by: Mike Bradner

Member of the Alaska House of Representatives
- In office 1967–1975

Personal details
- Born: August 26, 1928 Peoria, Illinois, U.S.
- Died: June 4, 2021 (aged 92) Anchorage, Alaska, U.S.
- Party: Republican
- Spouse: Pat Fink
- Children: 11
- Education: Bradley University (BS); University of Illinois, Urbana-Champaign (JD)

Thomas August Fink (August 26, 1928 – June 4, 2021) was an American Republican politician from Alaska. He was Mayor of Anchorage from 1987 to 1994 and Speaker of the Alaska House of Representatives from 1973 to 1975. He was also a member of the Federal Retirement Thrift Investment Board, serving from 1997 to 2010.

== Personal life ==
Fink was born in Peoria, Illinois. He received a Bachelor of Science from Bradley University in 1950, and a J.D. from the University of Illinois Law School in 1952. He moved to Anchorage, Alaska in 1952, and worked as a life insurance salesman from 1958 onward. He received his Chartered Life Underwriter certification from American College in 1963. Fink was in partnership with Don Schroer for 20 years, doing business as The Schroer-Fink Agency. Schroer was also often involved in Fink's various campaigns for office. He died on June 4, 2021, at the age of 92.

== Political career ==
Fink was elected to the Alaska House of Representatives in 1966, and became Speaker of the House in 1973. In 1975, he resigned in protest of a new law that would have required him to release a list of his insurance clients.

Fink mounted an unsuccessful bid to succeed term-limited Republican Governor of Alaska Jay Hammond in 1982. He ran on a platform promoting the relocation of the state capital from Juneau to Willow, but was defeated by Democrat Bill Sheffield.

In 1987, Fink was elected Mayor of Anchorage in the wake of a dramatic drop in the price of oil, which devastated the local economy. During his term in office, he advocated the sale of ATU, the municipal telephone utility. He received national attention for his stance on gay rights when he vetoed a 1993 municipal ordinance that would protect city employees from discrimination on the basis of sexual orientation. The same year, he called for the cancellation of funding for Pomo Afro Homos, a local theater group that included works with homosexual themes in their repertoire. In both cases, he was overridden by the Anchorage Assembly. In 1997, after sitting out one term, Fink returned to politics to mount an unsuccessful challenge to incumbent Republican mayor Rick Mystrom.

Political offices
Preceded by Gene Guess	Speaker of the Alaska House of Representatives; 1973–1975	Succeeded by Mike Bradner
Preceded by Tony Knowles	Mayor of Anchorage; 1987–1994	Succeeded by Rick Mystrom
Party political offices
Preceded by Jay Hammond	Republican nominee for Governor of Alaska; 1982	Succeeded by Arliss Sturgulewski
