= Thelma Engstrom =

American politician

Alaska Territorial House of Representatives
- In office 1947–1949

Personal details
- Born: September 9, 1905 Seattle, Washington
- Died: February 7, 1957 (aged 51) Rochester, Minnesota
- Spouse: Elton Engstrom Sr.
- Children: 1

Thelma Catherine Engstrom (née Wait) (September 9, 1905 – February 7, 1957) was a teacher, columnist and legislator in Alaska.

Born in Seattle, Washington, Engstrom graduated from the University of Washington in 1926. She taught school in Neppel, Washington and then in Wrangell and Douglas, Alaska. Engstrom was a columnist for in Juneau Daily Press in Juneau, Alaska. Engstrom served on the Douglas School Board. From 1947 to 1949, Engstrom served in the Alaska Territorial House of Representatives. Engstrom died from a brain tumor after emergency surgery at the Mayo Clinic in Rochester, Minnesota.

Her husband, Elton Engstrom Sr. was born in Wrangell, Alaska, and went to the University of Washington. He was in the family fishing business in Wrangell, Alaska and Juneau, Alaska. He served on the Douglas, Alaska City Council and as mayor of Douglas in 1943 and 1944. He was the Alaska Territory Republican Party chair in 1945 and was a delegate to the Republican National Convention from Alaska Territory in 1956. From 1951 to 1954 and 1957–1958, Elton represented the 1st District in the Alaska Territorial Senate. After Alaska became a state, he served in the Alaska State Senate from 1961 until his death in 1963. Engstrom died in a hospital in Juneau, Alaska following a heart attack.

Their son, attorney Elton Engstrom, Jr., served in both the Alaska House and Senate, and his daughter, Cathy Muñoz, served four terms in the Alaska House, representing Juneau, 2009–2017.
