= Edmund N. Orbeck =

American politician (1915–2012)

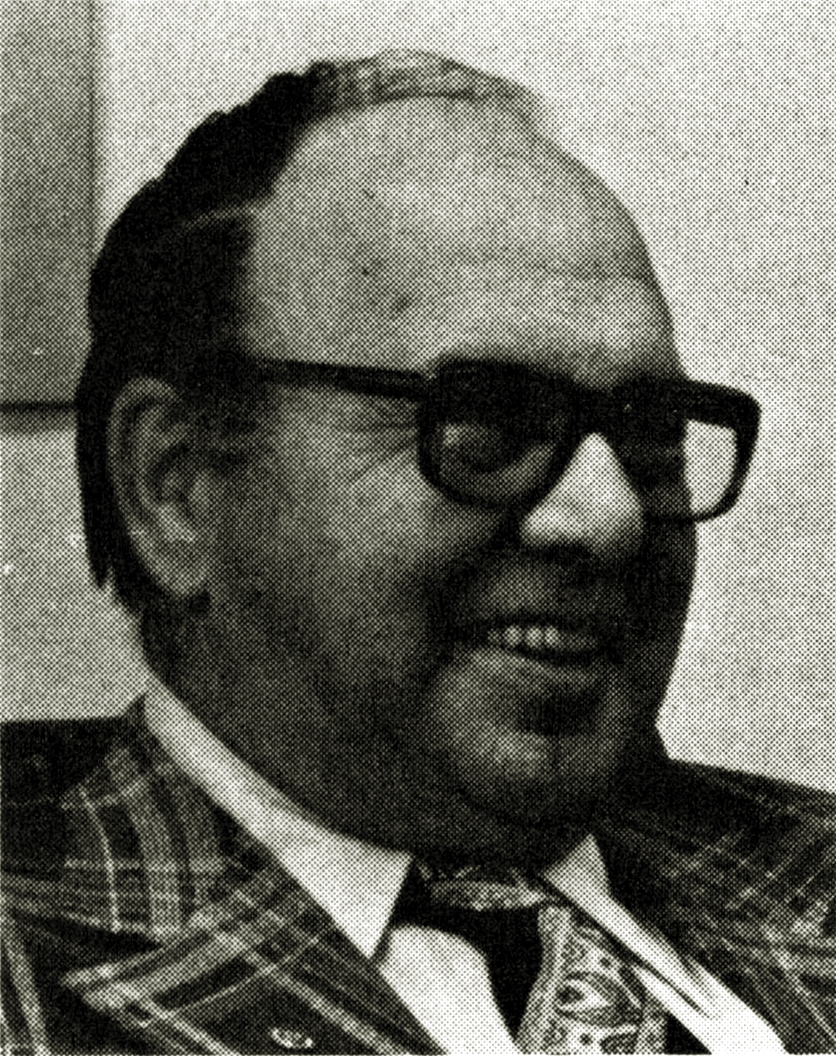
- Orbeck in 1977

Member of the Alaska Senate
- In office 1960–1961
- Appointed by: William A. Egan

Member of the Alaska House of Representatives
- In office 1964–1975

Personal details
- Born: Edmund John Mick Orbeck; September 16, 1915 West Union, Minnesota, U.S.
- Died: January 6, 2012 (aged 96) Arizona, U.S.
- Party: Democratic

Edmund N. Orbeck (September 16, 1915 – January 6, 2012) was an American football player, coach and politician. He served as a Democratic member of the Alaska House of Representatives and the Alaska Senate.

== Life and career ==
Orbeck was born in West Union, Minnesota. He played American football for the Los Angeles Bulldogs and Hollywood Rangers. He then was a football coach at the University of Alaska Fairbanks in 1949.

In 1960, Orbeck was appointed to the Alaska Senate by Governor William A. Egan, serving until 1961. In 1964, he was elected to the Alaska House of Representatives, serving until 1975.

Orbeck died on January 6, 2012, in Arizona, at the age of 96.
