= Mike Bradner =

American politician (1937–2021)

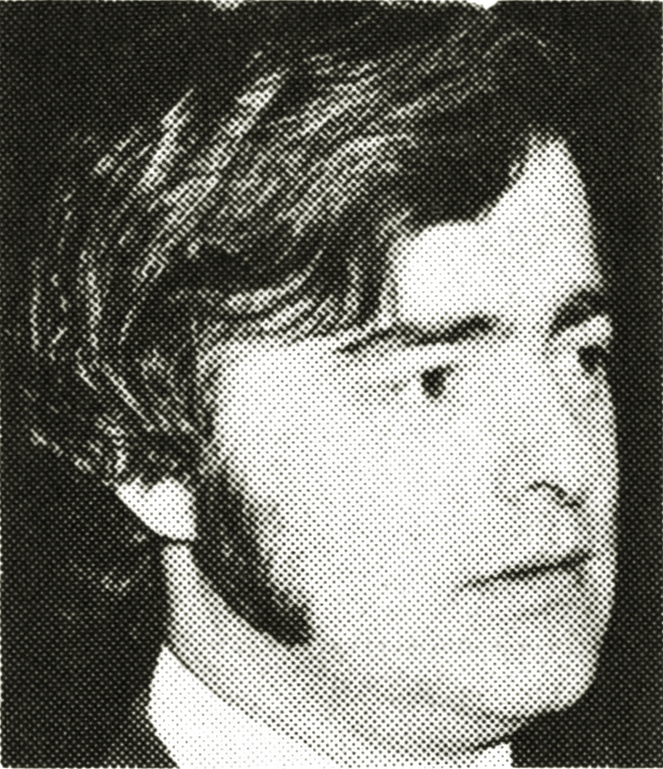

Speaker of the Alaska House of Representatives
- In office January 21, 1975 – January 10, 1977
- Preceded by: Tom Fink
- Succeeded by: Hugh Malone

Member of the Alaska House of Representatives from the 20th district
- In office January 21, 1975 – January 10, 1977
- Preceded by: Chuck Degnan
- Succeeded by: Multi-member district

Member of the Alaska House of Representatives from the 17th district
- In office January 8, 1973 – January 21, 1975
- Preceded by: Frank R. Ferguson
- Succeeded by: Phillip Guy

Member of the Alaska House of Representatives from the 16th district
- In office January 17, 1967 – January 8, 1973
- Preceded by: Multi-member district
- Succeeded by: Multi-member district

Personal details
- Born: March 3, 1937 Washington, D.C., U.S.
- Died: February 27, 2021 (aged 83) Anchorage, Alaska, U.S.
- Party: Democratic

Michael Drake Bradner (March 3, 1937 – February 27, 2021) was an American politician who served in the Alaska House of Representatives from 1967 to 1977.

== Biography ==
Bradner attended high school in Indiana and lived in the state of Washington before first moving to Alaska for a summer job on freight boats in the Yukon River. He graduated from University of Alaska Fairbanks. Following his marriage, Bradner became a journalist, first working for the Fairbanks Daily News-Miner.

In 1965, Bradner became a legislative assistant, and was elected to the state house in his own right during the next election cycle, serving through 1977. He served as Speaker of the Alaska House of Representatives from 1975 to 1977. In 1976, Bradner campaigned as a political independent, for a seat on the Alaska Senate, after losing a Democratic party primary to Richard Greuel. Bradner was a legislative aide to Steve Cowper's gubernatorial administration until resigning the position in January 1987.

Bradner and his first wife Janet raised four daughters, Michelle, Bonnie, and twins Heather and Heidi. He later married Jeanne, with whom he had two biological daughters Megan and Micaela and raised two foster daughters: Chelsea and Jessica .

Bradner died from complications of COVID-19 in Anchorage, Alaska, on February 27, 2021, at age 83, during the COVID-19 pandemic in Alaska, four days short of his 84th birthday.
