= Elton Engstrom Sr. =

American businessman and politician

Elton Egedeous Engstrom Sr. (June 6, 1905 — January 30, 1963) was an American businessman and politician.

Born in Wrangell, Alaska, Engstrom went to the Wrangell High School and to the University of Washington. He was in the family fishing business in Wrangell, Alaska and Juneau, Alaska. He served on the Douglas, Alaska City Council and as mayor of Douglas in 1943 and 1944. He was the Alaska Territory Republican Party chair in 1945 and was a delegate to the Republican National Convention from Alaska Territory in 1956. From 1951 to 1954 and 1957–1958, Engstrom represented the 1st District in the Alaska Territorial Senate. After Alaska became a state, he served in the Alaska State Senate from 1961 until his death in 1963. Engstrom died in a hospital in Juneau, Alaska after suffering a heart attack. In 1947, his wife, Thelma Engstrom, served in the 18th Session of the Alaska Territorial House.

Elton and Thelma's son, attorney Elton Engstrom Jr., served in both the Alaska House and Senate, and their granddaughter, Cathy Muñoz, served four terms in the Alaska House.
