= St. Mary's, Alaska =

Saint Mary's Negeqliq (Central Yupik)
- City
- Location within the state of Alaska
- Coordinates: 62°2′43″N 163°13′7″W
- Country: United States
- State: Alaska
- Census Area: Kusilvak
- Incorporated: August 2, 1967

Government
  - Mayor: William F. Alstrom
  - State senator: Donald Olson (D)
  - State rep.: Neal Foster (D)

Area
  - Total: 51.57 sq mi (133.56 km^{2})
  - Land: 44.61 sq mi (115.53 km^{2})
  - Water: 6.96 sq mi (18.03 km^{2})

Population (2020)
  - Total: 599
  - Density: 13.4/sq mi (5.19/km^{2})
- ZIP code: 99658
- Area code: 907
- FIPS code: 02-66140

St. Mary's (Central Yupik: Negeqliq) is a city in Kusilvak Census Area, Alaska, United States. The adjacent village of Andreafsky (historically known as Clear River) joined with St. Mary's in 1980. As of the 2020 census, St. Mary's had a population of 599.

Within Saint Mary's there are two federally recognized tribes the Algaaciq Native Village and the Yupiit of Andreafsky.

== Geography and climate ==
St. Mary's is located at 62°2′43″N 163°13′7″W (62.045305, -163.218629).

According to the United States Census Bureau, the city has a total area of 50.2 square miles (130 km^{2}), of which, 44.0 square miles (114 km^{2}) of it is land and 6.3 square miles (16 km^{2}) of it (12.47%) is water.

Climate data for St. Mary's (1961–1990 normals, extremes 1967–1983)
Month	Jan	Feb	Mar	Apr	May	Jun	Jul	Aug	Sep	Oct	Nov	Dec	Year
Record high °F (°C)	46 (8)	41 (5)	43 (6)	60 (16)	78 (26)	80 (27)	83 (28)	95 (35)	73 (23)	57 (14)	43 (6)	41 (5)	95 (35)
Mean maximum °F (°C)	34.8 (1.6)	34.3 (1.3)	38.4 (3.6)	47.7 (8.7)	65.1 (18.4)	73.5 (23.1)	76.4 (24.7)	73.9 (23.3)	65.0 (18.3)	49.4 (9.7)	38.1 (3.4)	35.0 (1.7)	79.1 (26.2)
Mean daily maximum °F (°C)	14.2 (−9.9)	15.7 (−9.1)	23.5 (−4.7)	33.3 (0.7)	50.4 (10.2)	59.9 (15.5)	63.8 (17.7)	61.7 (16.5)	53.0 (11.7)	36.8 (2.7)	21.9 (−5.6)	14.5 (−9.7)	37.5 (3.1)
Daily mean °F (°C)	9.0 (−12.8)	6.6 (−14.1)	15.2 (−9.3)	24.3 (−4.3)	42.2 (5.7)	50.8 (10.4)	55.2 (12.9)	53.8 (12.1)	44.7 (7.1)	30.2 (−1.0)	16.9 (−8.4)	6.6 (−14.1)	29.6 (−1.3)
Mean daily minimum °F (°C)	1.6 (−16.9)	0.3 (−17.6)	6.1 (−14.4)	17.6 (−8.0)	32.8 (0.4)	41.7 (5.4)	46.5 (8.1)	44.6 (7.0)	36.0 (2.2)	23.6 (−4.7)	9.6 (−12.4)	0.5 (−17.5)	21.8 (−5.7)
Mean minimum °F (°C)	−25.2 (−31.8)	−29.7 (−34.3)	−21.6 (−29.8)	−7.9 (−22.2)	19.6 (−6.9)	31.8 (−0.1)	38.0 (3.3)	34.1 (1.2)	23.4 (−4.8)	2.4 (−16.4)	−11.1 (−23.9)	−27.1 (−32.8)	−37.7 (−38.7)
Record low °F (°C)	−44 (−42)	−42 (−41)	−40 (−40)	−23 (−31)	2 (−17)	26 (−3)	30 (−1)	29 (−2)	15 (−9)	−13 (−25)	−29 (−34)	−41 (−41)	−44 (−42)
Average precipitation inches (mm)	1.04 (26)	0.71 (18)	0.74 (19)	0.76 (19)	1.03 (26)	2.02 (51)	2.62 (67)	3.09 (78)	2.34 (59)	1.70 (43)	1.63 (41)	1.45 (37)	19.13 (486)
Average snowfall inches (cm)	10.2 (26)	4.8 (12)	8.0 (20)	5.8 (15)	1.2 (3.0)	0.9 (2.3)	0.0 (0.0)	0.0 (0.0)	0.7 (1.8)	5.8 (15)	15.0 (38)	15.4 (39)	44.7 (114)
Average precipitation days (≥ 0.01 inch)	9.4	6.5	6.8	7.3	8.6	13.0	14.9	16.9	14.8	13.4	11.6	10.9	134.1
Average snowy days (≥ 0.1 inch)	9.4	5.9	7.6	7.8	1.9	0.9	0.0	0.0	0.6	5.6	11.4	9.9	61.0
Source 1: WRCC
Source 2: XMACIS (snowfall)

== Demographics ==
Historical population
Census	Pop.	Note	%±
1960	225		—
1970	384		70.7%
1980	382		−0.5%
1990	441		15.4%
2000	500		13.4%
2010	507		1.4%
2020	599		18.1%
U.S. Decennial Census

Saint Mary's first appeared on the 1960 U.S. Census as an unincorporated village. It was formally incorporated in 1967.

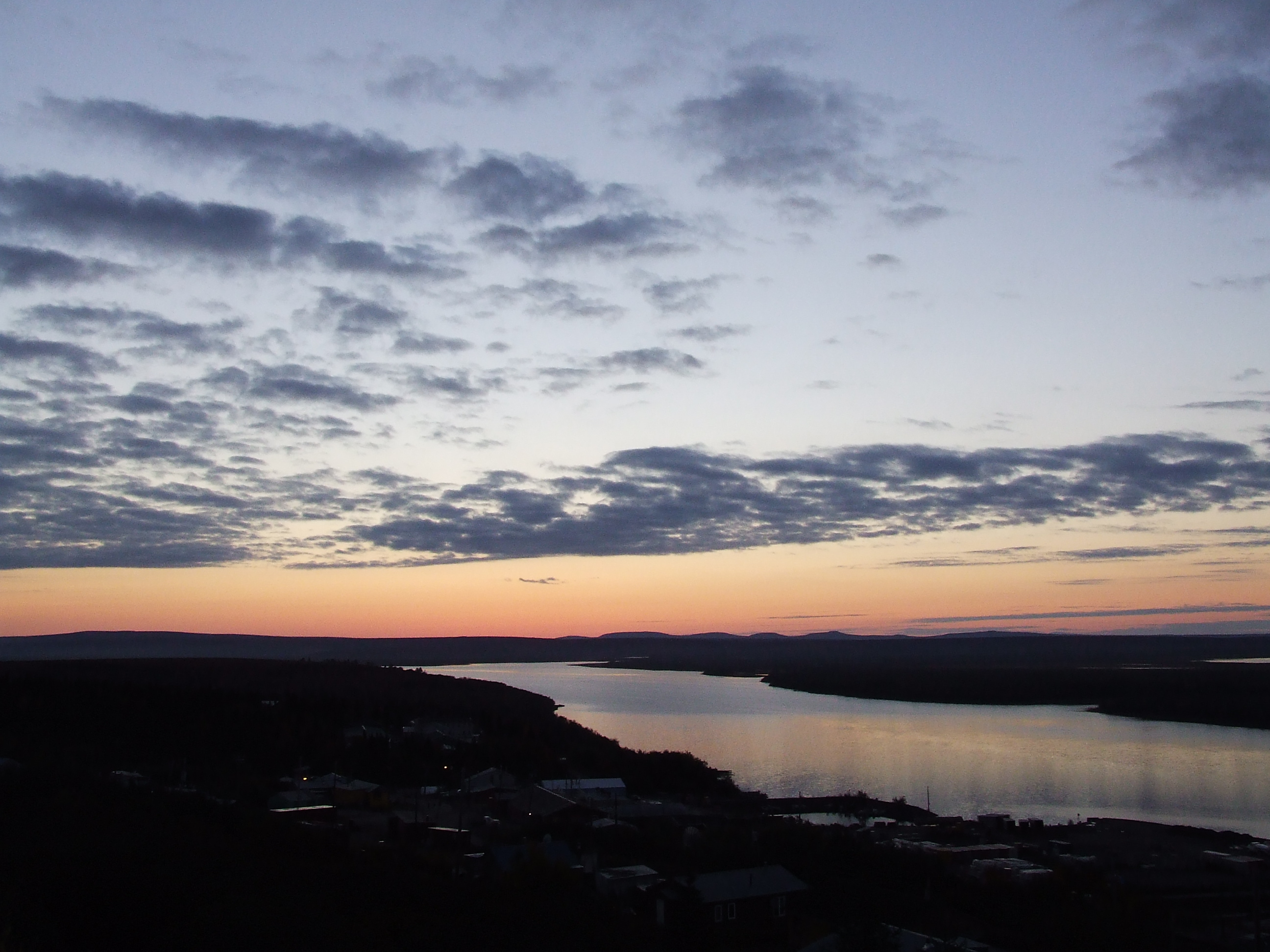
Sunrise over St. Mary's

=== 2020 census ===
As of the 2020 census, St. Mary's had a population of 599. The median age was 26.9 years. 37.2% of residents were under the age of 18 and 7.8% of residents were 65 years of age or older. For every 100 females there were 103.7 males, and for every 100 females age 18 and over there were 104.3 males age 18 and over.

0.0% of residents lived in urban areas, while 100.0% lived in rural areas.

There were 178 households in St. Mary's, of which 54.5% had children under the age of 18 living in them. Of all households, 28.7% were married-couple households, 20.8% were households with a male householder and no spouse or partner present, and 37.1% were households with a female householder and no spouse or partner present. About 29.8% of all households were made up of individuals and 6.1% had someone living alone who was 65 years of age or older.

There were 217 housing units, of which 18.0% were vacant. The homeowner vacancy rate was 0.0% and the rental vacancy rate was 0.0%.

Racial composition as of the 2020 census
Race	Number	Percent
White	25	4.2%
Black or African American	0	0.0%
American Indian and Alaska Native	557	93.0%
Asian	1	0.2%
Native Hawaiian and Other Pacific Islander	0	0.0%
Some other race	0	0.0%
Two or more races	16	2.7%
Hispanic or Latino (of any race)	2	0.3%

=== 2000 census ===
As of the census of 2000, there were 500 people, 137 households, and 90 families residing in the city. The population density was 11.4 inhabitants per square mile (4.4/km^{2}). There were 186 housing units at an average density of 4.2 per square mile (1.6/km^{2}). The racial makeup of the city was 11.20% White, 87.20% American Indian/Alaska Native. 0.40% of the population were Hispanic or Latino of any race.

There were 137 households, out of which 45.3% had children under the age of 18 living with them, 40.9% were married couples living together, 17.5% had a female householder with no husband present, and 34.3% were non-families. 28.5% of all households were made up of individuals, and 2.2% had someone living alone who was 65 years of age or older. The average household size was 3.58 and the average family size was 4.60.

In the city, the age distribution of the population shows 39.6% under the age of 18, 8.6% from 18 to 24, 30.4% from 25 to 44, 15.0% from 45 to 64, and 6.4% who were 65 years of age or older. The median age was 26 years. For every 100 females, there were 122.2 males. For every 100 females age 18 and over, there were 111.2 males.

The median income for a household in the city was $39,375, and the median income for a family was $31,875. Males had a median income of $35,313 versus $22,250 for females. The per capita income for the city was $15,837. About 21.5% of families and 20.4% of the population were below the poverty line, including 28.2% of those under age 18 and 10.3% of those age 65 or over.

== See also ==
- Andreafsky Wilderness
- Andreafsky River
