= Bill Ray (politician) =

American politician

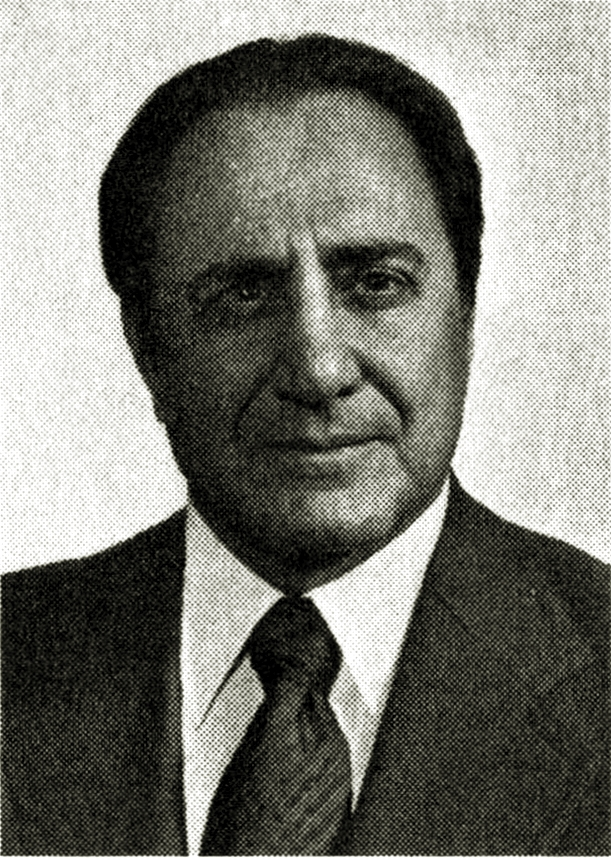

Member of the Alaska Senate
- In office 1970–1986

Member of the Alaska House of Representatives
- In office 1964–1970

Personal details
- Born: William C. Ray; April 6, 1922 Anaconda, Montana, U.S.
- Died: September 9, 2013 (aged 91) Seattle, Washington, U.S.

Military service
- Branch/service: United States Navy
- Battles/wars: World War II

Bill C. Ray Sr. (April 6, 1922 – September 9, 2013) was an American businessman, politician, and writer. He served as a member of the Alaska Legislature for 22 years (six in the House and an additional 16 in the Senate) as a Democrat representing Juneau.

== Early life ==
Bill Ray was born in Anaconda, Montana on April 6, 1922, to Eli and Marchetta Ray, who were of Serbian descent. Ray and his family lived in Montana, Idaho, and Oregon. After graduating from Wallace High School in Wallace, Idaho, Ray moved to Juneau, Alaska, in 1938 with his family.

== Career ==
Ray served in the United States Navy during World War II. He was stationed in Adak, Alaska, and Honolulu. He was discharged as a chief radioman. After leaving the navy, Ray returned to Juneau and worked as a bartender at the PaMaRay Club, a bar established by his parents along the busy "bar block" on Juneau's South Franklin Street. Ray also worked as a card dealer, a longshoreman, and in commercial fishing. He later went into business for himself in Juneau, owning and operating a bar, a liquor store, and a charter boat business. He was appointed to serve as a member of the Alaska Alcoholic Beverage Control Board by Governor William A. Egan and later served as chairman of the board.

Ray was elected as a Democrat to the Alaska House of Representatives in 1964 and then the Alaska Senate in 1970.

Ray is the namesake of the Bill Ray Center, a government building that housed legislative offices and the Alaska House and Senate Finance Committees during the 2016 extended legislative session.

== Personal life ==
In 2001, Ray moved to Sequim, Washington where he lived in retirement. In 2002, Ray wrote his memoir: Liquor, Legislation & Laughter: the story of a S.O.B. (Sweet Old Bill). He also wrote: The Hacker's Bible, about golf. Ray died of a heart attack in Seattle, Washington.
