= Elton Engstrom Jr. =

American lawyer and politician (1935–2013)

Elton Egedeous Engstrom Jr. (February 26, 1935 – November 6, 2013) was an American lawyer, businessman, writer, and politician. Engstrom served one term apiece in the Alaska House of Representatives and the Alaska Senate as a Republican during the 1960s, leaving in 1971. He was also a part of one of Alaska's longest-enduring political families; his father served in Alaska's territorial and state senates, his mother served in the territorial house, and his daughter, Cathy Muñoz was a member of the Alaska House from 2011 through January 16, 2017.

Elton Egedeous Engstrom Jr. was born in Juneau, Alaska, the elder of two sons born to Thelma Catherine (née Wait) and Elton Engstrom Sr. His father moved to Juneau from Wrangell in 1928. The Engstrom family were involved in the fisheries business and in local politics in Wrangell, and the elder Engstrom would continue in both endeavors in Juneau.

Engstrom served in the United States Army. He graduated from the University of Oregon and received his law degree from Harvard Law School. He worked in the family business, the Engstrom Brothers fish brokerage, and assumed management of the firm following his father's death in 1963. He was also in business in property management and retail arts sales. He was elected to the Alaska House of Representatives in 1964, serving a single term. In 1966, he was elected to the Alaska Senate, defeating Democratic incumbent Richard L. Peter. In 1968, Engstrom appeared statewide in television commercials endorsing Republican U.S. Senate nominee Elmer E. Rasmuson, emphasizing their shared views on fisheries issues. Engstrom would also serve only a single term as a senator, losing reelection in 1970 to Democrat Bill Ray.

Elton Engstrom Jr. married Sally Gray Hudson in 1963. Their oldest child and only daughter is Cathy Muñoz, who followed in his political footsteps. Muñoz served first on Juneau's city/borough assembly. She unsuccessfully challenged Juneau's state senator, Kim Elton, in 2002 but she was elected to the Alaska House in 2008 from a district centered on Juneau's Mendenhall Valley. Engstrom was also a prolific writer, with an emphasis on Alaska history. He wrote a column for the Juneau Empire for many years. With one of his sons, he wrote a biography of Alexander Baranof. He died in Juneau on November 6, 2013.
