= List of Native American politicians =

This is a list of Native American politicians in the United States. These are Native Americans who served in the federal, state, or municipal governments.

Native American identity is a complex and contested issue. The Bureau of Indian Affairs defines Native American as having American Indian or Alaska Native ancestry. Legally, being Native American is defined as being enrolled in a federally recognized tribe or Alaskan village. These entities establish their own membership rules, and they vary. Each must be understood independently. Ethnologically, factors such as culture, history, language, religion, and familial kinships can influence Native American identity.

All individuals on this list should have Native American ancestry. Historical figures might predate tribal enrollment practices and may be included based on reliable sources that document ethnological tribal membership. Any contemporary individuals should either be enrolled members of federally recognized tribes, or have cited Native American ancestry and be recognized as Native American by their respective tribes(s). Contemporary individuals who are not enrolled in a tribe but are documented as having tribal descent are listed as being "of descent" from a tribe.

For tribal leaders, please go to that tribe's article.

== Federal offices ==
=== Executive branch ===
Name	Image	Life	Ethnicity or tribe	Party	Offices held
Peter Pitchlynn		1806–1881	Choctaw Nation	Independent	Choctaw Ambassador to the United States, 1845–1861, 1866–1881
Peter Pitchlynn		1806–1881	Choctaw Nation	National Union	Choctaw Ambassador to the United States, 1845–1861, 1866–1881
Ely Parker		1828–1895	Tonawanda Seneca	Independent	Commissioner of Indian Affairs in the Grant administration
Charles Curtis		1860–1936	Kaw/Osage/Potawatomi	Republican	U.S. Vice President, 1929–1933
Ben Reifel		1906–1990	Rosebud Lakota	Republican	Interim Commissioner of Indian Affairs, 1976–1977
Wilma Victor		1919–1987	Choctaw Nation	Republican	Special assistant to Secretary of the Interior Rogers Morton, 1971–1975
LaDonna Harris		1931–	Comanche	Democratic	Member of the National Council on Indian Opportunity, 1968–1970
Ada Deer		1935–2023	Menominee	Democratic	6th Assistant Secretary of the Interior for Indian Affairs, 1993–1997
Neal McCaleb		1935–2025	Chickasaw Nation	Republican	8th Assistant Secretary of the Interior for Indian Affairs, 2001–2003
Ross Swimmer		1943–	Cherokee Nation	Republican	4th Assistant Secretary of the Interior for Indian Affairs, 1985–1989; Special Trustee for American Indians at the U.S. Department of the Interior, 2003–2009
Larry Echo Hawk		1948–	Pawnee Nation	Democratic	11th Assistant Secretary of the Interior for Indian Affairs, 2009–2012
David W. Anderson		1953–	Lac Courte Oreilles Ojibwe	Republican	9th Assistant Secretary of the Interior for Indian Affairs, 2004–2005
Marilynn Malerba		1953–	Mohegan	Independent	45th Treasurer of the United States, 2022–2024
Kevin Gover		1955–	Pawnee Nation	Democratic	7th Assistant Secretary of the Interior for Indian Affairs, 1997–2001
Deb Haaland		1960–	Laguna Pueblo	Democratic	54th United States Secretary of the Interior, 2021–2025
Roselyn Tso		1962–	Navajo Nation	Democratic	Director of the Indian Health Service, 2022–2025
Karina Walters		1964–	Choctaw Nation	Democratic	Director of the Tribal Health Research Office at the National Institutes of Health, 2023–present
Yvette Herrell		1964–	Cherokee Nation	Republican	Assistant Secretary of Agriculture for Congressional Relations, 2025–present
Carl J. Artman		1965–	Oneida	Republican	10th Assistant Secretary of the Interior for Indian Affairs, 2007–2008
Keith Harper		1965–	Cherokee Nation	Democratic	U.S. representative to the United Nations Human Rights Council, 2014–2017
Buzzy Peltola		1966–2023	Orutsararmiut Yup'ik, Tlingit	Independent	Regional Director for Alaska for the Bureau of Indian Affairs, 2018–2022
Kimberly Teehee		1966–	Cherokee Nation	Democratic	White House Senior Policy Advisor for Native American Affairs, 2009–2012
Kevin K. Washburn		1967–	Chickasaw Nation	Democratic	12th Assistant Secretary of the Interior for Indian Affairs, 2012–2016
Jeannie Hovland		1969–	Santee Dakota Sioux	Republican	Commissioner for the Administration for Native Americans, 2018–2021
Tara Sweeney		1973–	Arctic Slope Iñupiat	Republican	13th Assistant Secretary of the Interior for Indian Affairs, 2018–2021
Markwayne Mullin		1977–	Cherokee Nation	Republican	9th United States Secretary of Homeland Security, 2026–present
T. W. Shannon		1978–	Chickasaw Nation	Republican	Senior Advisor to Secretary Brooke Rollins, US Department of Agriculture, 2025–2026
Bryan Newland		1981–	Bay Mills Chippewa	Democratic	14th Assistant Secretary of the Interior for Indian Affairs, 2021–2025
Sam Brown		1983–	Cherokee Nation	Republican	Under Secretary of Veterans Affairs for Memorial Affairs, 2025–present
Jack Jackson Jr.			Navajo Nation	Democratic	Liaison to Secretary John Kerry, US Department of State
Patrice Kunesh			Of Standing Rock Lakota descent Not a registered member	Democratic	Commissioner of the Administration for Native Americans, 2023–present

== State offices ==
=== Alaska ===
Name	Image	Life	Ethnicity or tribe	Party	Offices held
Albert P. Adams		1942–2012	Inupiaq	Democratic	State representative 1981–1989, state senator 1989–2001
Billy Akers		1947–	[?]	Republican	State representative 1977–1979
Charles G. Anderson		1929–2022	Aleut	Republican	State representative 1981–1983
Nels A. Anderson, Jr.		1939–	Yup’ik	Democratic	State representative 1975–1981, state senator 1982–1983
Thomas Baker		1995–	Inuit	Republican	State representative 2023–2025
Bill Beltz		1912–1960	Inupiaq	Democratic	Territorial representative 1949–1951, territorial senator 1951–1959, state senator and president of the state senate 1959–1960
Robyn Burke		1991–	Inupiaq	Democratic	State representative 2025–present
Ray Christiansen		1922–1998	Yup’ik	Democratic	State representative 1961–1967, state senator 1967–1973
Joseph Chuckwuk		1948–	Yup’ik	Democratic	State representative 1981–1983
John E. Curtis		1915–1999	Inupiaq	Republican	State representative 1959–1961
Larry T. Davis		1930–2006	Inupiaq	Democratic	State representative 1975–1977
Chuck Degnan		1941–	Inupiaq	Democratic	State representative 1971–1975
Frank Degnan		1901–1980	[?]	Democratic	Territorial representative 1951–1953
Bryce Edgmon		1961–	Yup'ik	Democratic	State representative 2007–present, speaker of the state house 2017–2021
Bryce Edgmon		1961–	Yup'ik	Independent	State representative 2007–present, speaker of the state house 2017–2021
Charles Fagerstrom		1905–1962	Inupiaq	Democratic	Territorial representative 1953–1957, state representative 1959–1961
Frank R. Ferguson		1939–2003	Inupiaq	Democratic	State representative 1971–1975, state senator 1975–1986
Frank R. Ferguson		1939–2003	Inupiaq	Independent	State representative 1971–1975, state senator 1975–1986
Neal Foster		1972–	Inupiaq	Democratic	State representative 2009–present
Richard Foster		1946–2009	Inupiaq	Democratic	State representative 1989–2009
Charles Franz		c. 1910–1996	[?]	Democratic	State representative 1959–1961
Phillip Guy		1941–2011	Yup’ik	Democratic	State representative 1973–1981
Willie Hensley		1941–	Inupiaq	Democratic	State representative 1967–1971, state senator 1971–1975 and 1987–1989
Adelheid Herrmann		1953–	Dena'ina	Democratic	State representative 1983–1989
Jimmy Hoffman		c. 1925–1982	Yup’ik	Republican	State representative 1959–1961
Lyman Hoffman		1950–	Yup’ik	Democratic	State representative 1987–1991 and 1993–1995, state senator 1991–1993 and 1995–present
Andrew Hope		1896–1968	Tlingit	Democratic	Territorial representative 1945–1953 and 1957–1959, state representative 1959–1963
Eben Hopson		1922–1980	Inupiaq	Democratic	Territorial representative 1957–1959, state senator 1959–1967
Jimmy Huntington		1916–1987	Koyukon	Independent	State representative 1975–1977
Percy Ipalook		1906–1990	Inupiaq	Republican	Territorial representative 1949–1951, territorial senator 1951–1955
Brenda Itta		1943–	Inupiaq	Democratic	State representative 1975–1977
Ivan M. Ivan		1945–	Yup’ik	Democratic	State representative 1991–1993 and 1995–1999
George Jacko		1959–	Aleut	Democratic	State representative 1989–1993, state senator 1993–1995
George Jacko		1959–	Dena'ina	Democratic	State representative 1989–1993, state senator 1993–1995
George Jacko		1959–	Yup’ik	Democratic	State representative 1989–1993, state senator 1993–1995
Arthur D. Johnson		1920–1961	[?]	Republican	State representative 1961
Axel C. Johnson		1911–1985	Yup’ik	Democratic	State representative 1959–1961 and 1963–1967
Frank G. Johnson		1894–1982	Tlingit	Republican	Territorial representative 1947–1955 and 1957–1959
Frank L. Johnson		c. 1904–[?]	Inupiaq	Republican	Territorial representative 1949–1951
Grace A. Johnson		1924–2004	Inupiaq	Republican	State representative 1962–1963
Reggie Joule		1952–	Inupiaq	Democratic	State representative 1997–2012
Sam Kito III		1964–	Tlingit	Democratic	State representative 2014–2019
Albert Kookesh		1948–2021	Tlingit	Democratic	State representative 1997–2005, state senator 2005–2013
Jacob Laktonen		1917–1996	Alutiiq	Republican	State representative 1973–1975
Loren Leman		1950–	Alutiiq	Republican	State representative 1989–1993, state senator 1993–2002, lieutenant governor 2002–2006
Georgianna Lincoln		1943–	Gwich'in	Democratic	State representative 1991–1993, state senator 1993–2005
John Lincoln		1981–	Inupiaq	Democratic	State representative 2018–2021
John Lincoln		1981–	Inupiaq	Independent	State representative 2018–2021
Don Long		1944–	Inupiaq	Democratic	State representative 1996–1997
Jerry Mackie		1962–	Haida	Democratic	State representative 1991–1997, state senator 1997–2001
Jerry Mackie		1962–	Haida	Republican	State representative 1991–1997, state senator 1997–2001
Eileen MacLean		1949–1996	Inupiaq	Democratic	State representative 1989–1995
Byron Mallott		1943–2020	Tlingit	Democratic	Commissioner of community and regional affairs 1972–1974, lieutenant governor 2014–2018
Byron Mallott		1943–2020	Tlingit	Independent	Commissioner of community and regional affairs 1972–1974, lieutenant governor 2014–2018
Beverly Masek		1963–	Deg Hit'an	Republican	State representative 1995–2005
Charisse Millett		1964–	Inupiaq	Republican	State representative 2009–2019
Martin B. Moore		1937–2022	Yup’ik	Democratic	State representative 1971–1973
Carl M. Morgan		1950–	Yup’ik	Republican	State representative 1999–2005
Carl E. Moses		1929–2014	Aleut	Alaskan Independence	State representative 1965–1973 and 1993–2007
Carl E. Moses		1929–2014	Aleut	Democratic	State representative 1965–1973 and 1993–2007
Carl E. Moses		1929–2014	Aleut	Republican	State representative 1965–1973 and 1993–2007
Benjamin Nageak		1950–	Inupiaq	Democratic	State representative 2013–2017
Alfred Nakak		1947–2000	Inupiaq	Democratic	State representative 1977–1979
Ed Naughton		1930–2002	[?]	Democratic	State representative 1971–1977
Irene Nicholia		1956–	Koyukon	Democratic	State representative 1993–1999
John Nusunginya		1927–1981	Inupiaq	Democratic	State representative 1959–1963
Donny Olson		1953–	Inupiaq	Democratic	State senator 2001–present
Alvin Osterback		1915–2005	[?]	Democratic	State representative 1975–1981
Justin Parish		1980–	Tinglit	Democratic	State representative 2017–2019
Josiah Patkotak		1994–	Inupiaq	Independent	State representative 2020–2023
Moses Paukan		1933–2017	Yup’ik	Democratic	State representative 1968–1971
William Paul		1885–1977	Tlingit	Republican	Territorial representative 1925–1929, (first Alaska Native legislator)
Frank Peratrovich		1895–1984	Tlingit	Democratic	Territorial representative 1945–1947, territorial senator 1947–1951 and 1957–1959, delegate and first vice president of constitutional convention 1955–1956, state senator 1959–1967, president of the state senate 1961–1965, state representative 1969–1973
Larry Peterson		1939–	Gwich'in	Democratic	State representative 1973–1975
John Sackett		1944–2021	Koyukon	Republican	State representative 1967–1971, state senator 1973–1987
Woodie Salmon		1952–	Gwich'in	Democratic	State representative 2005–2011
Mary Sattler		1973–	Yup’ik	Democratic	State representative 1999–2009
Leo Schaeffer		1947–2024	Inupiaq	Democratic	State representative 1977–1981
Frank See		1915–1998	Tlingit	Democratic	State representative 1965–1969
Martin Seversen		1925–1979	[?]	[?]	State representative 1977
Jake Stalker		1917–c. 2008	Inupiaq	Democratic	State representative 1961–1967
Bill Thomas		1947–	Tlingit	Republican	State representative 2005–2013
Tony Vaska		1948–	Yup’ik	Democratic	State representative 1981–1985
Kay Wallis		1944–	Gwich'in	Democratic	State representative 1985–1991
Tim Wallis		1940–	Gwich'in	Democratic	State representative 1975–1977
Jerry Ward		1948–	Alaskan Athabaskan	Alaskan Independence	State representative 1983–1985, state senator 1997–2003
Jerry Ward		1948–	Alaskan Athabaskan	Republican	State representative 1983–1985, state senator 1997–2003
James K. Wells		1906–1979	Inupiaq	Democratic	Territorial representative 1951–1953
John Westdahl		1918–1968	Yup’ik	Democratic	State representative 1967–1968
Dean Westlake		1960–	Inupiaq	Democratic	State representative 2017
Alfred Widmark		1904–1989	Tlingit	Republican	State representative 1961–1963
Bill K. Williams		1943–2019	Tlingit	Democratic	State representative 1993–2005
Bill K. Williams		1943–2019	Tlingit	Republican	State representative 1993–2005
Jules W. Wright		1933–2022	Gwich'in	Republican	State representative 1967–1969
Fred Zharoff		1944–2001	Alutiiq	Democratic	State representative 1979–1985, state senator 1985–1997
Tiffany Zulkosky		1984–	Yup’ik	Democratic	State representative 2018–present

=== Arizona ===
Name	Image	Life	Ethnicity or tribe	Party	Offices held
Carlyle Begay		[?]	Navajo	Democratic	State senator 2013–2017
Carlyle Begay		[?]	Navajo	Republican	State senator 2013–2017
Jennifer D. Benally		[?]	Navajo	Democratic	State representative 2015–2017
Wenona Benally			Navajo	Democratic	State representative 2017-2019
Jasmine Blackwater-Nygren			Navajo	Democratic	State representative 2020–2023
Domingo DeGrazia			Cherokee	Democratic	State representative 2019–2023
Eric Descheenie			Navajo	Democratic	State representative 2017–2019
Chris Deschene			Navajo	Democratic	State representative 2009–2011
Luis A. Gonzalez			Pascua Yaqui	Democratic	State senator, District 10, 1979–1986
Sally Ann Gonzales		1957–	Pascua Yaqui	Democratic	State representative 1997–2001 and 2011–2019
Tom Gordon			Hualapai	Republican	State representative 1999–2001
Albert Hale		1950–2021	Navajo	Democratic	State senator 2004–2011; State representative 2011–2021
Benjamin Hanley		1941–	Navajo	Democratic	State representative, 1973–1998
Theresa Hatathlie			Navajo	Democratic	State Senator for AZ District 6, 2023 – present
James Henderson Jr.		1942–	Navajo	Democratic	State senator, District 5, 1985–1999
Arthur J. Hubbard Sr.		1912–2014	Navajo, Tohono Oʼodham	Democratic	State senator 1972–1984
Lloyd House		1931–2015	Navajo, Oneida	Democratic	State representative 1967–1968
Jack Jackson, Jr.			Navajo	Democratic	State Senator for AZ District 2, 2011–2013, State representative 2003–2005
Jennifer Jermaine			White Earth Ojibwe	Democratic	State representative for the 18th district (2019–present)
Sylvia Laughter		[?]	Navajo	Democratic	State representative 1999–2005
Sylvia Laughter		[?]	Navajo	Independent	State representative 1999–2005
Myron Lizer			Navajo / Comanche	Republican	10th Vice President of the Navajo Nation
Peter MacDonald		1928–	Navajo	Republican	7th Chairman of the Navajo Nation (1970–1989)
Jonathan Nez		1975–	Navajo	Democratic	9th President of the Navajo Nation
Debora Lynn Norris			Navajo, Tohono Oʼodham	Democratic	State representative, District 11, 1997–2002
Victoria Steele		[?]	Seneca	Democratic	State representative 2013–2016, State senator 2019–2023
Arlando Teller			Navajo	Democratic	State representative 2019–2021
Albert Tom		1956–	Navajo	Democratic	State representative, 2001–2002, 2005–2008
Myron Tsosie			Navajo	Democratic	State representative 2019–present
Daniel Peaches		1940–2022	Navajo	Democratic	State representative, 1975–1984
Jamescita Peshlakai			Navajo	Democratic	State representative, District 7 (2013-2015) State senator (2017-2021)
Mae Peshlakai			Navajo	Democratic	State representative, District 6 (2023–present)
Peterson Zah		1937–2023	Navajo	Democratic	Special Adviser to ASU President on American Indian Affairs

=== Arkansas ===
Name	Image	Life	Ethnicity or tribe	Party	Offices held
Donna Hutchinson		1949–	Blackfeet	Republican	State representative, District 98, 2007–2013
Jeremy Young Hutchinson		1974–	Blackfeet	Republican	State representative 2000–2007; State senator 2011–2018
Timothy Chad Hutchinson		1974–	Blackfeet	Republican	State representative, District 95, 2005–2011
Zachary Gramlich		1993–	Choctaw	Republican	State representative, District 50, 2023–present

=== California ===
Name	Image	Life	Ethnicity or tribe	Party	Offices held
Pío Pico		1801–1894	Indigenous Sonoran	Independent	Governor of California (1845–1846), Member of the Los Angeles Common Council (1853)
Pío Pico		1801–1894	Indigenous Sonoran	Republican	Governor of California (1845–1846), Member of the Los Angeles Common Council (1853)
Todd Gloria		1978–	Tlingit–Haida	Democratic	State assemblyman (2017–2020) Mayor of San Diego (2020–present)
James C. Ramos		1967–	Serrano / Cahuilla	Democratic	San Bernardino Community College Board of Trustees (2005–12), San Bernardino County Board of Supervisors (2012–2018), California State Assemblymember (2018–present)

=== Colorado ===
Name	Image	Life	Ethnicity or tribe	Party	Offices held
Ben Nighthorse Campbell		1933–2025	Northern Cheyenne	Democratic	Member of the Colorado House of Representatives from the 59th district (1983–1987) United States Senate (1993-2005)
Ben Nighthorse Campbell		1933–2025	Northern Cheyenne	Republican	Member of the Colorado House of Representatives from the 59th district (1983–1987) United States Senate (1993-2005)

=== Idaho ===
Name	Image	Life	Ethnicity or tribe	Party	Offices held
Joseph R. Garry		1910–1975	Coeur d'Alene	Democratic	State representative (1956–1960)
Jeanne Givens		1951/52–	Coeur d'Alene	Democratic	State representative (1985–1989)
Larry Echo Hawk		1948–	Pawnee Nation	Democratic	Attorney General of Idaho (1991–1995)
Paulette Jordan		1979–	Coeur d'Alene	Democratic	State representative (2014–2018); Democratic nominee for Governor in 2018; Democratic nominee for Senate in 2020

=== Illinois ===
Name	Image	Life	Ethnicity or tribe	Party	Offices held
Donne E. Trotter		1950–	Choctaw	Democratic	State senator (1993–2018); State representative (1988–1993)

=== Kansas ===
Name	Image	Life	Ethnicity or tribe	Party	Offices held
Ponka–We Victors		1981–	Ponca–Tohono O'odham	Democratic	State representative, District 103 (2011–2023)
Stephanie Byers		1963-	Chickasaw	Democratic	State representative, District 86 (2021-2023)
Christina Haswood		1994-	Navajo	Democratic	State representative, District 10 (2021–2025)

=== Kentucky ===
Name	Image	Life	Ethnicity or tribe	Party	Offices held
Reginald Meeks		1954–	Cherokee Nation	Democratic	State representative (2000–2021)

=== Maine ===
Name	Image	Life	Ethnicity or tribe	Party	Offices held
Lola Coly (Cola/Nicola)			Penobscot	Independent	State representative, 1980–1897, 1911–1913
Matthew Dana II			Passamaquoddy	Independent	State representative (non–voting)
Lewy Mitchell			Passamaquoddy	Independent	State representative 1880–1881, 1883–1887, 1895–1897, 1903–1905
Wayne Mitchell		1952–2019	Penobscot	Independent	State representative (non–voting)
John S. Nelson			Penobscot	Independent	State representative, 1957–1971
Peter M. Nelson			Penobscot	Independent	State representative, 1905–1907
Peter F. Neptune			Passamaquoddy	Independent	State representative, 1905–1907
Joseph Neptune			Passamaquoddy	Independent	State representative, 1907–1909
Joseph Nicolar		1827–1894	Penobscot	Independent	State representative, 1859–1866, 1881–1894
Rena Newell			Passamaquoddy	Independent	State representative (non-voting)
Sebatis Shay			Penobscot	Independent	State representative, 1899–1901
Nicholas Sockabasin			Penobscot	Independent	State representative, 1907–1909
Peol Sockis			Penobscot	Independent	State representative, 1853–1856, 1861–1866
Madonna Soctomah			Passamaquoddy	Independent	State representative (non-voting)
Henry John Bear			Maliseet	Green	State representative (non–voting)
Brian Reynolds			Maliseet	Independent	State representative (non-voting)

=== Massachusetts ===
Name	Image	Life	Ethnicity or tribe	Party	Offices held
Watson F. Hammond		1837–1919	Montauk	Republican	State representative (1885)

=== Michigan ===
Name	Image	Life	Ethnicity or tribe	Party	Offices held
Cora Reynolds Anderson		1882-1950	Chippewa	Republican	State representative (1924-1925)
Adam Hollier		1985–	Muscogee Creek Nation	Democratic	State senator (2018–2022)

=== Minnesota ===
Name	Image	Life	Ethnicity or tribe	Party	Offices held
Susan Allen		1963–	Rosebud Lakota	Democratic (DFL)	State representative (2012–2019)
Jamie Becker–Finn		1982–	Leech Lake Ojibwe	Democratic (DFL)	State representative (2017–present)
Harold "Skip" Finn		1948–2018	Leech Lake Ojibwe	Democratic (DFL)	State senator (1991–1996)
Peggy Flanagan		1979–	White Earth Band of Ojibwe	Democratic (DFL)	U.S. Senator-elect (term begins January 2027); Lieutenant Governor of Minnesota (2019–present); State representative (2015–2019)
Steve Green		1960–	White Earth Band of Ojibwe	Republican	State representative (2013–2023); State senator (2023–present)
Mary Kelly Kunesh–Podein		1960–	Standing Rock Lakota	Democratic (DFL)	State representative (2017–2021); State senator (2021–present)

=== Mississippi ===
Name	Image	Life	Ethnicity or tribe	Party	Offices held
Greenwood LeFlore		1800–1865	Mississippi Choctaw	Whig	State representative, State senator (1841–1844)
Carolyn Crawford		1970–	Saginaw Chippewa	Republican	State representative (2012–present)

=== Montana ===
Name	Image	Life	Ethnicity or tribe	Party	Offices held
Dolly Akers		1901–1986	Assiniboine	Democratic	State representative, 1933–1934
Jade Bahr		1988–	Northern Cheyenne	Democratic	State representative, district 50 (2019–2021)
Barbara Bessette			Chippewa Cree	Democratic	State representative, district 24 (2018–present)
Norma Bixby		1941–	Northern Cheyenne	Democratic	State representative, district 41 (2000–2008)
Margarett Campbell		1954–	Assiniboine	Democratic	State representative, district 31 (2004–2011)
Bill Eggers			Crow	Democratic	State representative, district 6 (1998–2003)
Bob Gervais		1931–	Blackfeet Nation	Democratic	State representative (1989–1993)
George Heavy Runner		1955–	Blackfeet Nation	Democratic	State representative, district 85 (1995–1998)
Joey Jayne		1957–	Navajo	Democratic	State representative, district 15 (2001–2009)
Carol Juneau		1945–	Mandan and Hidatsaa	Democratic	State representative (1998–2007); State senator (2007–2011)
Denise Juneau		1967–	Mandan and Hidatsaa	Democratic	Superintendent of Public Instruction (2009–2017)
Carolyn Pease–Lopez			Crow	Democratic	State representative (2008–2016)
Leo Kennerly Jr.		1936–1980	Blackfeet Nation	Democratic	State representative (1977–1979)
Roland Kennerly		1934–2004	Blackfeet Nation	Democratic	State representative (1981–1987)
Gary Kimble		1942–2022	Gros Ventre	Democratic	State representative (1972–1978)
George Kipp III			Blackfeet Nation	Democratic	State representative (2015–2019)
Rhonda Knudsen		1958–	Turtle Mountain Band of Chippewa	Republican	State representative (2019–present); Speaker pro tempore of the Montana House (2023–present)
G. Bruce Meyers		1948–	Chippewa–Cree	Republican	State representative (2015–2017)
Shane Morigeau		1984–	Confederated Salish and Kootenai	Democratic	State representative (2017–2021); State senator (2021–present)
Alvin Not Afraid Jr.			Crow	Republican	Chairman of the Crow Nation (2016–present)
Gerald Pease		1954–	Crow	Democratic	State representative (1997–1998); State senator, district 21 (2001–2009)
Rae Peppers			Crow	Democratic	State representative (2013–2021)
Frosty Boss Ribs		1955–	Blackfeet Nation	Democratic	State Representative (2009–2011, 2013–2015)
Tyson Runningwolf			Blackfeet Nation	Democratic	Representative for Montana house district 16 (2019–present)
Angela Russell		1943–	Crow	Democratic	State representative (1987–1995)
Jason Small		1978–	Northern Cheyenne	Republican	State senator (2017–present)
Veronica Small-Eastman		1941–	Crow	Democratic	State representative, district 42 (2002–2009)
Frank Smith		1942–	Assiniboine, Sioux	Democratic	State representative (1998–2004, 2011–2013); State senator (2004–2009, 2017–2021)
Sharon Stewart–Peregoy		1953–	Crow	Democratic	State senator (2009–2017); State representative (2017–present)
Jay O. Stovall		1940–2011	Crow	Republican	State representative (1992–2000)
Jean A. Turnage		1926–2015	Confederated Salish and Kootenai	Republican	State representative, State senator (1969–1983)
Bill Whitehead		1939–	Assiniboine, Sioux	Democratic	State representative (1997–1998)
Lea Whitford			Blackfeet Nation	Democratic	State senator (2015–present)
Marvin Weatherwax Jr.			Blackfeet Nation	Democratic	State representative, district 15 (2019–present)
Susan Webber			Blackfeet Nation	Democratic	State representative (2015–present)
Jonathan Windy Boy			Chippewa–Cree	Democratic	State representative (2002–2008); State senator (2008–present)
Bill Yellowtail		1948–	Crow	Democratic	State senator (1985–1994)

=== Nebraska ===
Name	Image	Life	Ethnicity or tribe	Party	Offices held
Tom Brewer		1958–	Oglala	Republican	State senator, District 43, 2017–2025

=== Nevada ===
Name	Image	Life	Ethnicity or tribe	Party	Offices held
Dewey Sampson		1898–1982	Pyramid Lake Paiute	Democratic	State representative, District 1, 1938–1940
John Oceguera		1968–	Walker River Paiute	Democratic	State representative, 2000–2012
Shea Backus		1975–	Cherokee	Democratic	State representative, 2018–2020

=== New Mexico ===
Name	Image	Life	Ethnicity or tribe	Party	Offices held
Michelle Paulene Abeyta			Native	Democratic	State representative, District 69 2025 – present
Anthony Allison			Navajo	Democratic	State representative, District 4 2019 – present
James D. Atcitty		1932–2014	Navajo	Democratic	State representative, District 1 1964–1966
Thomas Atcitty		1933–2020	Navajo	Democratic	State representative, District 4, 1981–1995
Reginald A. Begaye		c. 1944–	Navajo	Democratic	State representative, 1979–1980
Wilbert C. Begay		1939–	Navajo	Republican	State representative, District 1, 1966–1970
Ray Begaye		1954–	Navajo	Democratic	State representative, District 4 (1999–2013)
John Block		1997-	Unknown	Republican	State representative, 2023-present, District 51 (2023-present)
Patricia Roybal Caballero		1949-	Piro-Manso-Tiwa	Democratic	State representative (2013–present)
Angel Charley			Native	Democratic	State senator (2025–present)
Jake C. Chee		1907–2014	Navajo	Republican	State representative, District 1, 1966–1968
Wendell Chino		1923–1998	Apache	"Red Capitalism"	President of Mescalero Apache Nation 1965-1998
Sharon Clahchischilliage		1948–	Navajo	Republican	State representative, District 4, 2013–2018
Deb Haaland		1960–	Laguna Pueblo	Democratic	Governor-elect (term begins January 2027), (first Native American woman elected governor of a U.S. state)
Yvette Herrell		1964–	Cherokee	Republican	State representative, District 51, 2011–2019.
Jack Jackson Sr.		1933–	Navajo	Democratic	State representative
Sandra D. Jeff		1967/68–	Navajo	Democratic	State representative, District 5
Sandra D. Jeff		1967/68–	Navajo	Libertarian	State representative, District 5
Doreen Wonda Johnson		1953–	Navajo	Democratic	State representative (2015–present)
Monroe Jymm		1933–1990	Navajo	Democratic	State representative, District 1 1965–1967
Tom Lee		1920–1986	Navajo	Republican	State senator District 3 1966–1978, (first Native American elected to the New Mexico Senate)
Derrick Lente			Sandia & Isleta Pueblo	Democratic	State representative, District 26 (2013–)
Georgene Louis			Acoma Pueblo	Democratic	State representative, District 26 (2013–2023)
Brenda McKenna			Nambé Pueblo	Democratic	State senator, District 9 (2021-)
Lynda Lovejoy		1949–	Navajo	Democratic	State representative, State senator, District 22 (2007-2013), Public Regulation Commissioner
James Madalena		1948–	Jemez Pueblo	Democratic	State representative (1985–2017)
Patricia A. Madrid		1994–	Pueblo	Democratic	
John Pinto		1924–2019	Navajo	Democratic	State senator, District 3, 1977–2019
Shannon Pinto			Navajo	Democratic	State senator, District 3 (2019–present)
Nick L. Salazar		1929–2020	Tewa (Ohkay Owingeh)	Democratic	State representative, 40th District (1974–present)
Benny Shendo			Jemez Pueblo	Democratic	State senator (2013–present)
Albert Shirley		c. 1956–	Navajo	Democratic	State representative, District 6, 1985–1992
Leonard Tsosie		1955–	Navajo	Democratic	State senator, District 22, 1993–2007
Leo C. Watchman		1937–1993	Navajo	Democratic	State representative, 1968–1979, 1983–1993

=== New York ===
Name	Image	Life	Ethnicity or tribe	Party	Offices held
Claire Valdez		1989–	Ysleta del Sur Pueblo	Democratic	State representative, District 37 2025 – present

=== North Carolina ===
Name	Image	Life	Ethnicity Tribe	Party	Offices held
Pamela Brewington Cashwell			Lumbee and Coharie	Democratic	Secretary of Administration 2021–2025, North Carolina Secretary of Cultural Resources 2025–present
Anna Ferguson			Eastern Band of Cherokee Indians	Republican	State representative, 2025–present
Charles Graham		1951–	Lumbee	Democratic	State representative, 2011–2023
Jarrod Lowery		1988-	Lumbee	Republican	State representative, 2023–2025
John Lowery			Lumbee	Republican	State representative, 2025–present
David T. McCoy		1952–	Turtle Mountain Chippewa	Democratic	state public official, State Controller, State Budget Director, and Secretary of the North Carolina Department of Transportation
Henry Ward Oxendine		1940–2020	Lumbee	Democratic	State representative, 1973–1976
Ronnie N. Sutton		1941-	Lumbee	Democratic	State representative, 1993-2011

=== North Dakota ===
Name	Image	Life	Ethnicity or tribe	Party	Offices held
Dennis Bercier		1952–2012	Turtle Mountain Ojibwe	Democratic-NPL	State senator, 1999-2005
Collette Brown			Spirit Lake	Democratic-NPL	State representative, 2024–present
Ruth Buffalo			Mandan, Hidatsa, and Arikara Nation	Democratic-NPL	State representative, 2018-2022
Dawn Marie Charging			Mandan, Hidatsa, and Arikara Nation	Republican	State representative, 2005–2007
Jayme Davis			Turtle Mountain Ojibwe	Democratic-NPL	State representative, 2022–present
Lisa Finley-DeVille			Mandan, Hidatsa, and Arikara Nation	Democratic-NPL	State representative, 2023–present
Daniel F. Jérome		1930–	Métis/Ojibwe	Democratic-NPL	State senator, 1990–1994
Les J. LaFountain			Turtle Mountain Ojibwe	Democratic-NPL	State senator, 1995-1998
Richard Marcellais		1947–	Turtle Mountain Ojibwe	Democratic-NPL	State senator, 2007-2022, 2024–present
Joseph Menz		1883–1970	Standing Rock Sioux	Republican	State representative, 1957–1963
Wayne Trottier			Standing Rock Sioux	Republican	State representative, 2011-2022
Arthur J. Raymond		1923–2009	Oglala	Republican	State representative, 1971–1975

=== Oklahoma ===
Name	Image	Life	Ethnicity or tribe	Party	Offices held
Larry Adair		1946-	Cherokee Nation	Democratic	State representative (1982–2004), Speaker of the Oklahoma House of Representatives (2001–2004)
Jimmy Belvin		1900–1986	Choctaw Nation	Democratic	Bryant County Superintendent (1941–1952), State representative (1955–1961), State senator (1961–1965), Chief of the Choctaw Nation of Oklahoma (1948–1975)
Scott Bighorse		c. 1956–	Osage Nation	Democratic	State representative (2006–2008), Assistant Principal Chief of the Osage Nation (2010–2014), Principal Chief of the Osage Nation (2014), Member of the Osage Nation Congress (2018–present)
Lisa Johnson Billy		1967–	Chickasaw Nation	Republican	Chickasaw Nation Tribal Legislator (1996–2002; 2016–present), State representative (2004–2016), 1st Oklahoma Secretary of Native American Affairs (2019)
Brian Bingman		1953–	Muscogee Creek Nation	Republican	Member of the Sapulpa city council (1992–2004), Mayor of Sapulpa (1994-2004), State representative (2004-2006), State senator (2006–2016), President pro tempore of the Oklahoma Senate (2011-2016), 36th Secretary of State of Oklahoma (2020–2023), 2nd Oklahoma Secretary of Native American Affairs (2020–2023), Member of the Oklahoma Corporation Commission (2025–present)
Brad Boles		1983–	Cherokee Nation	Republican	State representative (2018–present)
Chelsey Branham			Chickasaw Nation	Democratic	State representative (2018–2020)
Josh Brecheen		1979–	Choctaw Nation	Republican	State senator (2010–2018), U.S. Congressman (2023–present)
Steve Burrage		1952–	Choctaw Nation	Democratic	State Auditor (2008–2011), State Tax Commissioner (2014–2016)
Sean Burrage		1968–	Choctaw Nation	Democratic	State senator (2006–2014), Senate Minority leader (2012–2014), President of Southeastern Oklahoma State University (2014–2019); Chancellor of the Oklahoma State System of Higher Education (2024–present)
Trey Caldwell		1988–	Choctaw Nation	Republican	State representative (2019–present)
Bobby Cleveland		1943-	Choctaw Nation	Republican	State representative (2012–2018)
Amanda Clinton		1978–	Cherokee Nation	Democratic	State representative (2025–present)
Helen Cole		1922-2004	Chickasaw Nation	Republican	State representative (1979–1984), State senator (1984-1988, 1991-1996)
Tom Cole		1949–	Chickasaw Nation	Republican	State senator (1988–1991), 26th Secretary of State of Oklahoma (1995–1999), U.S. Congressman (2003–present)
Doug Cox		1952–	Muscogee Creek Nation	Republican	State representative (2005–2017)
Gilbert Dukes		1849–1919	Choctaw Nation	Republican	Republican nominee for Lieutenant Governor in 1910
William A. Durant		1866–1948	Choctaw Nation	Democratic	State representative (1907–1917), Speaker of the Oklahoma House (1911–1913)
James Dyer		1887–1951	Choctaw Nation	Democratic	State representative (1946–1951)
J. Gladstone Emery		1900–1978	Muscogee Creek Nation	Democratic	State senator (1947–1951)
Rusty Farley		1953–2011	Cherokee Nation	Republican	State representative (2011)
Scott Fetgatter		1968–	Choctaw Nation	Republican	State representative (2016–present)
Avery Frix		1994–	Choctaw Nation	Republican	State representative (2017–2022), State senator (2024–present)
William Fourkiller		1965–	Cherokee Nation	Democratic	State representative (2010–2018)
Kristina Gabriel			Cherokee Nation	Democratic	State representatives (2026-present)
Larry Glenn		1947–	Cherokee Nation	Democratic	State representatives (2005-2015)
Todd Gollihare		1964–	Cherokee Nation	Republican	State Senator (2023–present)
Enoch Kelly Haney		1940–2022	Seminole Nation	Democratic	State representative (1980–1986), State senate (1986–2002)
David Hardin			Cherokee Nation	Republican	State representative (2018–present)
Erick Harris			Muscogee Creek Nation	Republican	State representative (2024–present)
Benjamin F. Harrison		1875–1936	Choctaw Nation	Democratic	State representative (1907–1910), Oklahoma Secretary of State (1911–1915)
Katie Henke		1980–	Cherokee Nation	Republican	State representative (2012–2018)
David Holt		1979–	Osage Nation	Republican	State senator (2010–2018), Mayor of Oklahoma City (2018–)
Chuck Hoskin		1952–	Cherokee Nation	Democratic	State representative (2007–2019)
Shane Jett		1974–	Cherokee Nation	Republican	State representative (2004–2010), State senator (2021–present)
Fred Jordan		1974–	Cherokee Nation	Republican	State representative (2007–2015)
Dan Kirby		1946–	Muscogee Creek Nation	Republican	State representative (2009–2017)
Elias Landrum		1866–1958	Cherokee Nation	Democratic	Cherokee Nation district judge (1893-1895), Cherokee Nation senator (1895-1899), Tahlequah Alderman (1899-1903), Tahlequah city recorder (1903-1905), State senator (1907-1913), Craig County Treasurer (1930-1934), Craig County Judge (1934-1936)
Richard Lerblance		1946–	Muscogee Creek Nation	Democratic	State senator (2003–2012), State representative (2002–2003)
Ken Luttrell		1953–	Cherokee Nation	Democratic	State representative (2007–present)
Ken Luttrell		1953–	Cherokee Nation	Republican	State representative (2007–present)
Joseph L. Manus		1871–1920	Cherokee Nation	Democratic	State representative (1907–1908)
Al McAffrey		1948–	Choctaw Nation	Democratic	State representative (2007–2015)
Mark McBride		1961–	Citizen Potawatomi	Republican	State representative (2012–2024)
Neal McCaleb		1935–2025	Chickasaw Nation	Republican	State representative (1975–1983), Oklahoma Secretary of Transportation (1995–2001)
Ray McCarter		1946–	Chickasaw Nation	Democratic	State representative (1996–2008)
Curtis McDaniel		1952–	Cherokee Nation	Democratic	State representative (2012–2014)
Skye McNiel		1978–	Muscogee Creek Nation	Republican	State representative (2007–2013)
Jerry McPeak		1946–	Muscogee Creek Nation	Democratic	State representative (2005–2016)
Johnston Murray		1902–1974	Chickasaw Nation	Democratic	Governor (1951–1955)
Johnston Murray		1902–1974	Chickasaw Nation	Republican	Governor (1951–1955)
Mike Osburn		1968–	Cherokee Nation	Republican	State representative (2016–present)
John Pfeiffer		1986–	Cherokee Nation	Republican	State representative (2014–present)
Anastasia Pittman		1970–	Seminole Nation	Democratic	State representative (2007–2013), State senator (2014–2018)
Ajay Pittman		1993–	Seminole Nation	Democratic	State representative (2019–2026)
Thomas LaFayette Rider		1856-1932	Cherokee Nation	Democratic	State representative (1907–1910; 1912-1914), State senator (1916-1920)
Dustin Roberts			Choctaw Nation	Republican	State representative (2010–2022)
Hollis E. Roberts		1943–2011	Choctaw Nation	Democratic	State representative (1975–1979)
Seneca Scott		1977–	Choctaw Nation	Democratic	State representative (2008–2016)
Ally Seifried		1992-	Cherokee Nation	Republican	State senator (2023–present)
William F. Semple		1883–1969	Choctaw Nation	Democratic	State representative (1909–1911)
T. W. Shannon		1978–	Chickasaw Nation	Republican	State representative (2007–2015), Speaker of the Oklahoma House (2013–2014), Lieutentant Governor (2027–)
Jerry Shoemake		1943–2022	Cherokee Nation	Democratic	State representative (2005–2016)
Ralph Shortey		1982–	Rosebud Lakota	Republican	State representative (2011–2017)
Sylvester Soldani		1860–1934	Osage Nation	Democratic	State senator (1907–1910)
John Sparks			Cherokee Nation	Democratic	State senator (2006–2018)
Ron Stewart			Choctaw Nation	Democratic	State representative (2024–present)
William G. Stigler		1891–1952	Choctaw Nation	Democratic	State senator (1924–1932)
Kevin Stitt		1972–	Cherokee Nation	Republican	Governor (2019–2027)
Dan Sullivan		1963–	Choctaw Nation	Republican	State representative (2004–2011)
Amanda Swope		1988–	Muscogee Creek Nation	Democratic	State representative (2022–2025)
Houston B. Teehee		1874–1953	Cherokee Nation	Democratic	Mayor of Tahlequah (1907–1909), State representative (1910–1914)
Bob A. Trent		1913–1992	Choctaw Nation	Democratic	State representative, state senator
Tim Turner			Choctaw Nation	Republican	State representative (2024–present)
Mark Vancuren		1964–	Cherokee Nation	Republican	State representative (2018–2025)
Paul Wesselhoft		1947–	Citizen Potawatomi	Republican	State representative (2005–2017)
Collin Walke		1982–	Cherokee Nation	Democratic	State representative (2016–2023)
Cory Williams			Cherokee Nation	Democratic	State representative (2009–2019)
William P. Willis		1911–1998	Kiowa Nation	Democratic	State representative (1958–1986), 35th Speaker of the Oklahoma House of Representatives (1973-1978)
Jonathan Wingard		1982–	Choctaw Nation	Republican	State senator (2024–present)
Justin Wood		1989-	Sac and Fox Nation	Republican	State representative (2012–2016)
Tom Woods		1994-	Chickasaw Nation	Republican	State senator (2023–present)

=== Oregon ===
Name	Image	Life	Ethnicity or tribe	Party	Offices held
Jackie Taylor		1935–2008	Potawatomi	Democratic	State representative (1991–2001)
Tawna Sanchez		1961–	Shoshone, Bannock, Ute	Democratic	State representative (2017–present)

=== Pennsylvania ===
Name	Image	Life	Ethnicity or tribe	Party	Offices held
Barbara Smith		1950–	Sac and Fox Nation	Democratic	State representative (2006–2010)

=== South Carolina ===
Name	Image	Life	Ethnicity or tribe	Party	Offices held
Fawn Pedalino		1987–	Natchez-Kusso	Republican	State representative (2023–present)

=== South Dakota ===
Name	Image	Life	Ethnicity or tribe	Party	Offices held
Jim Bradford		1933–2020	Oglala Sioux	Democratic	State senator (2009–2017); State representative (2001–2009)
Ed Iron Cloud III		1964–	Oglala Sioux	Democratic	State representative (2009–2012)
Jim Emery		1934–2021	Cheyenne River Sioux	Republican	State representative (1985–1986), State senator (1986–1996)
Pat Flynn		1922–1979	Lakota	Republican	State senator (1971–1973)
Red Dawn Foster			Oglala Sioux/Navajo	Democratic	State representative (2019 –present)
Tamara Grove			Lakota Sioux/Anishinaabe	Republican	State representative (2025 –present)
Troy Heinert		1972 –	Rosebud Lakota	Democratic	State representative (2013–2015), State senator (2015–Present)
Philip N. Hogen			Oglala Sioux	Republican	United States Attorney for the District of South Dakota (1981–1991), Commissioner of the National Indian Gaming Commission (2002–2009)
Tamara St. John		1966 –	Dakota Sioux	Republican	State representative (2019 – )
Kevin Killer		1979 –	Oglala Sioux	Democratic	State representative (2009–2017), State senator (2017–2019)
Steve Livermont		1955 –	Oglala Sioux	Republican	State representative (2017–2021)
Ellis T. Peirce		1846–1926	Oglala Sioux	Republican	State representative (1903–1904)
Peri Pourier		1983–	Oglala Sioux	Republican	State representative (2019–present)
Thomas Short Bull		1946–	Oglala Sioux	Democratic	State senator (1983–1988)
Theresa Two Bulls		1949–2020	Oglala Sioux	Democratic	State senator (2005–2009)
Tyler Tordsen			Dakota Sioux	Republican	State representative (2023 – )
Paul Valandra		1953–	Rosebud Lakota	Democratic	State representative (1991–2000), State senator (2001–2006)
Tom Van Norman		1964–	Cheyenne River Sioux	Democratic	State representative (2000–2008)
Ron J. Volesky		1954–	Hunkpapa	Republican	State representative (1981–1986, 1993–2000), State senator (2001–2002)
Ron J. Volesky		1954–	Hunkpapa	Democratic	State representative (1981–1986, 1993–2000), State senator (2001–2002)
Bruce Whalen		1962–	Oglala Sioux	Republican	Oglala Sioux tribal administrator, former chair of the Oglala Lakota County Republican Party and nominee for South Dakota's at-large congressional district in 2006

=== Tennessee ===
Name	Image	Life	Ethnicity or tribe	Party	Offices held
Bryan Terry		1968–	Choctaw Nation	Republican	State representative (2015–present)

=== Utah ===
Name	Image	Life	Ethnicity or tribe	Party	Offices held
Angela Romero			Assiniboine	Democratic	State representative (2013–present)

=== Washington ===
Name	Image	Life	Ethnicity or tribe	Party	Offices held
George Adams		1880–1954	Skokomish	Democratic	State representative (1933–1939), (1945–1954)
W. Ron Allen		1947—	S'Klallam	Independent	Tribal chairman (1977–present), NCAI treasurer and president,
Don Barlow		1938–2016	Ottawa	Democratic	State representative (2007–2009)
William Bishop		1861–1934	Snohomish	Republican	State senator (1919–1927), (1933–1934), State representative (1899–1903), (1905–1907), (1909–1911), (1917–1919)
Jim Dunn		1942–	Inuit	Republican	State representative (1997–2003), (2005–2009)
Claudia Kauffman		1959–	Nez Perce	Democratic	State senator (2007–2011)
Debra Lekanoff		1971–	Tlingit	Democratic	State representative (2019–)
John McCoy		1943–	Tulalip	Democratic	State senator (2013–2020), State representative (2003–2013)
Jeff Morris		1964–	Tsimshian	Democratic	State representative (1997–2020)
Chief George Pierre		1926–2011	Colville	Democratic	State representative (1965–1967)
Jay Rodne		1966–	Bad River Ojibwe	Republican	State representative (2004–2019)
Dino Rossi		1959–	Tlingit	Republican	State senator (1997–2003, 2012, 2017); 2004 and 2008 Republican nominee for Governor
Chris Stearns			Navajo Nation	Democratic	State representative (2022- )
Lois Stratton		1927–2020	Spokane	Democratic	State senator (1985–1993), State representative (1980–1985)
John Tennant		1830–1893	Quapaw		Territorial representative (1858–1860)

=== Wyoming ===
Name	Image	Life	Ethnicity or tribe	Party	Offices held
W. Patrick Goggles		1952–	Arapaho	Democratic	State representative (2004–2015)
Affie Ellis		1979/1980–	Navajo	Republican	State senator (2017–2025)
Andi LeBeau			Arapaho	Democratic	State representative (2019–2023)
Scott Ratliff		1943–	Eastern Shoshone	Democratic	State representative (1980–1992)
Ivan Posey			Eastern Shoshone	Democratic	State representative (2025–present)

== Municipal offices ==
=== Alaska ===
- Josiah Patkotak (Inupiaq), North Slope Borough Mayor (2023–present)

=== Arizona ===
- Roberta Cano, (Navajo, Zuni Pueblo) Winslow Mayor (2021–present)
- Doreen Garlid, Navajo, Tempe, Arizona Councilmember (2020-present), NLC 2nd Vice President
- Don Martin, (Choctaw) member of the Mohave County Board of Supervisors (2025–present)

=== California ===
- Tasha Cerda (Tohono O'odham Nation), Gardena Mayor (2017–present), City Council (2009–2013)
- Todd Gloria (Tlingit, Haida), San Diego Mayor (2020–present; 2013–2014 (acting)), San Diego City Councilman (2008–2016), San Diego City Council President (2012–2014)
- Jackie Fielder (Mandan, Hidatsa, and Arikara Nation), member of the San Francisco Board of Supervisors (2025–present)
- Mitch O'Farrell (Wyandotte), Los Angeles City Councilman (2013-2022), President of the Los Angeles City Council (2022)

=== Idaho ===
- William (Bill) Weems, (Coeur d'Alene) Plummer City Council (2012–2016) Mayor (2016–present)

=== Illinois ===
- Anthony Tamez, (Oji-Cree, Saulteaux, Sicangu Lakota) Chicago Police District Council for District 17 (2023–present)

=== Maine ===
- April Fournier, (Navajo) Portland, Maine Portland City Council At-Large (2021–present)

=== Minnesota ===
- Renee Van Nett, (Leech Lake Ojibwe) Duluth City Council

=== New Mexico ===
- April J. Silversmith, Navajo Democrat (Gallup, NM Magistrate Judge)
- Carol Bowman Muskett, Navajo Democrat (McKinley County, NM Commissioner District I)
- Genevieve Jackson, Navajo Democrat (McKinley County, NM Commissioner District II)
- Harriet K. Becenti, Navajo Democrat (McKinley County, NM Clerk)
- Thommy Nelson, Navajo Democrat (McKinley County, NM Probate Judge)
- Felix Begay, Navajo Democrat (McKinley County, NM Sheriff)
- Earnest Becenti, Navajo Democrat (Mckinley County, NM County Treasurer)
- GloJean Todacheene, Navajo Democrat (San Juan County, NM Commissioner District I)

=== North Carolina ===
- Reverend C.E. Locklear, 1897-1980, Lumbee), mayor of Pembroke, North Carolina (1945)

=== Oklahoma ===
- Susan Bayro (Osage Nation), mayor of Pawhuska (2024–present)
- Brian Bingman (b. 1953, Muscogee Nation), Sapulpa city councilor (1992-2004) and mayor of Sapulpa, Oklahoma (1994-2004)
- Thomas Buffington (1855-1938, Cherokee Nation), mayor of Vinita, Oklahoma (1903-1917)
- John Tyler Hammons (b. 1988, Cherokee Nation), mayor of Muskogee, Oklahoma (2008–2012), City Attorney of Checotah (2019–present)
- David Holt (b. 1979, Osage Nation), mayor of Oklahoma City, Oklahoma (2018–present)
- Elias Landrum (1866-1958, Cherokee Nation), Tahlequah, Oklahoma Alderman (1899-1903) and Tahlequah Recorder (1903-1905)
- Houston B. Teehee (1874-1953, Cherokee Nation), Mayor of Tahlequah, Oklahoma (1907-1909)
- Martin Tucker (b. 1963, Choctaw Nation), mayor of Durant, Oklahoma (2023–present)

=== Utah ===
- Willie Grayeyes, Navajo Democrat (San Juan County, UT Commission)
- Kenneth Maryboy, Navajo Democrat (San Juan County, UT Commission)
- Robin Troxell, Hopi Tribe of Arizona (Brigham City Councilmember)

=== Washington ===
- Christopher Roberts, (b. 1978, Choctaw) Shoreline City Council (2010–present)
- Roxanne Murphy, (Nooksack) Bellingham City Council [2012–2018]
- Debora Juarez, (Blackfeet) Seattle City Council [2016–present]

=== Wisconsin ===
- Wahsayah Whitebird, (b. 1991) Ojibwe Communist, City Council of Ashland, Wisconsin [2019-2021]
- Kristie Goforth, (Sault Tribe of Chippewa Indians), Monona City Council [2020–present]

== Other offices ==
- Diego Archuleta (1814 – 1884), Member of the Mexican Congress, soldier in the Mexican Army, in the Mexican–American War, Native American Agent by President Abraham Lincoln, and member of the Union Army (US Army) during the American Civil War. He was the first Hispanic Brigadier General.
- Fleming Begaye Sr. (1921–2019) (Navajo) – Navajo Code Talker, Honorary Chair of the Native American Coalition of the Donald J. Trump for President Campaign, 2016.
- Elias Cornelius Boudinot (1835–1890) (Cherokee) — Tribal Representative to the Confederate Congress, 1862–65. Represented the Cherokee Nation.
- Samuel Benton Callahan (1833–1911) (Creek) — Tribal Representative to the Confederate Congress, 1864–65. Represented the Creek and Seminole nations.
- Plenty Coups (1848–1932) (Crow) – Representative of Native Americans for the dedication of the Tomb Of The Unknown Soldier
- Robert McDonald Jones (1808–1872) (Choctaw) — Tribal Representative to the Confederate Congress, 1863–65. Represented the Choctaw and Chickasaw nations.
- Peter MacDonald (born 1928) (Navajo) – Member of Richard Nixon's Committee to Re-Elect the President (CRP) in 1972.
- Will Rogers (1879–1935, Cherokee), honorary mayor of Beverly Hills, California
- Clarence L. Tinker (1887–1942) (Osage) – Major General, highest ranking Native American officer in the Army, Commander of the 7th Air Force in Hawaii, shot down and killed during the Battle of Midway.

== See also ==
- List of Indigenous Canadian politicians
- List of Native American jurists
- Native American women in politics
