= Peregoy =

Peregoy is a surname. Notable people with the surname include:

- Sharon Stewart-Peregoy (born 1953), American politician
- Walter Peregoy (1925–2015), American artist and animator
