= Senator Pease (disambiguation) =

Henry R. Pease (1835–1907) was a U.S. Senator from Mississippi from 1874 to 1875; also serving in the South Dakota State Senate. Senator Pease may also refer to:

- Calvin Pease (1776–1839), Ohio State Senate
- Don Pease (1932–2002), Ohio State Senate
- Ed Pease (born 1951), Indiana State Senate
- Elisha M. Pease (1812–1883), Texas State Senate
- Gerald Pease (born 1954), Montana State Senate
