= Dennis Bailey (politician) =

Politician

Member of the Oklahoma House of Representatives from the 1st district
- In office November 2008 – November 2010
- Preceded by: Jerry Ellis
- Succeeded by: Rusty Farley

Personal details
- Born: 1953 (age 72–73)
- Party: Democratic Party

Dennis Bailey (born 1953) is an American politician who served in the Oklahoma House of Representatives representing the 1st district from 2008 to 2010.

== Biography ==
Dennis R. Bailey was born in 1953 and graduated from Oklahoma State University and Eastern Oklahoma State College. He spent 32 years working for the Oklahoma Cooperative Extension Service and was elected to the Oklahoma House of Representatives as a member of the Democratic Party in 2008. He lost his reelection campaign in 2010 to Rusty Farley.
