= Jeff Rabon =

American politician

Member of the Oklahoma House of Representatives from the 5th district
- In office November 1996 – November 2008
- Preceded by: Jack Bell
- Succeeded by: Jerry Ellis

Personal details
- Born: Durant, Oklahoma, United States
- Party: Democratic Party
- Education: Oklahoma State University

Jeff Rabon is an American politician who served in the Oklahoma Senate representing the 5th district from 1996 to 2008.

== Biography ==
Jeff Rabon was born in Durant, Oklahoma, and he graduated from Oklahoma State University with a degree in public relations and journalism. After graduating college, Rabon worked as a field representative for U.S. Senator David Boren, a campaign manager and assistant for Bill Brewster, a legislative liaison for the National Rifle Association, and an administrative assistant for Jack Mildren.

In April 1989, Rabon was arrested and plead guilty to transporting an open container. He received a one-year deferred sentence. In November 1989, he was again arrested for driving under the influence, plead guilty, and received two one-year suspended sentences.

Rabon was elected as a member of the Democratic Party to represent the 5th district of the Oklahoma Senate in 1996, succeeding fellow Democrat Jack Bell. He served in that office until term limited in 2008.

In 2005, Rabon crashed his truck into a ditch near Hugo and an Oklahoma Highway Patrol officer was later disciplined for not investigating the crash. In 2007, he was charged with driving under the influence for failing a field sobriety test after a three car accident.
