= Lisa Finley-DeVille =

American politician

Member of the North Dakota House of Representatives from the 4A district
- Incumbent
- Assumed office December 1, 2022
- Preceded by: Office established

Personal details
- Party: Democratic-NPL
- Spouse: Walter Sr.
- Children: 5
- Education: Nueta Hidatsa Sahnish College (AAS, AS, BS); University of Mary (MBA, MM)

Lisa Finley-DeVille is a Native American politician serving as a member of the North Dakota House of Representatives from the 4A district. She is a member of the Democratic-NPL.

Finley-DeVille is a citizen of the Mandan, Hidatsa, and Arikara Nation. She endorsed the Joe Biden 2024 presidential campaign.

== See also ==
- List of Native American politicians
- Native American women in politics
