= Carolyn Pease-Lopez =

American politician

Member of the Montana House of Representatives from the 42nd district
- In office January 2009 – January 2, 2017
- Succeeded by: Sharon Stewart-Peregoy

Personal details
- Party: Democratic
- Profession: Pastor

Carolyn Pease-Lopez is a Democratic former member of the Montana House of Representatives, serving from 2009 until 2017. She was elected to House District 42 which represents the Big Horn County area. Pease-Lopez is a member of the Crow Tribe, and has stated her intention in protecting tribal land, with a focus on giving federal protections to the Pryor Mountains.

Pease-Lopez served as Minority Caucus Leader of the House during the 2015-2016 session.

== See also ==
- List of Native American politicians
- Native American women in politics
