= Thelma Buchholdt =

American politician

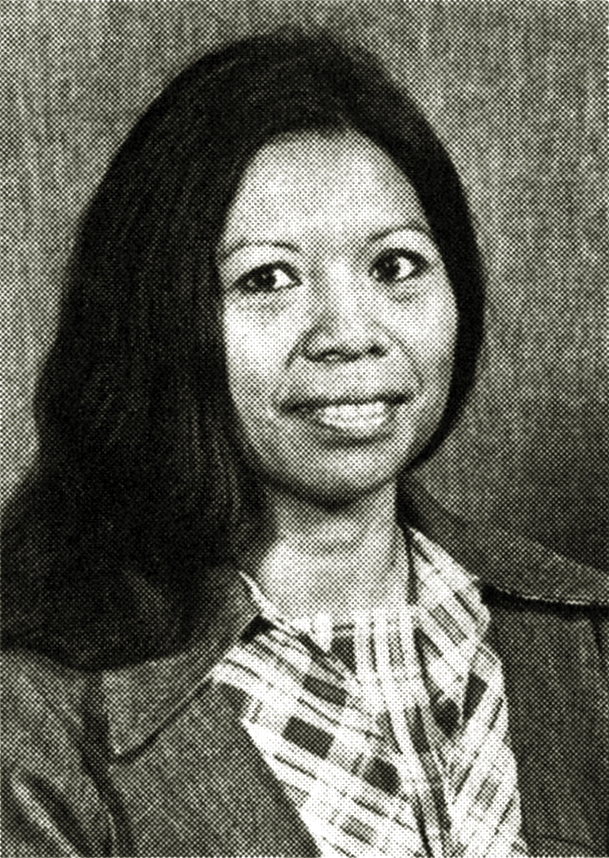
- Thelma Buchholdt in 1977

Member of the Alaska House of Representatives from the 9th district
- In office January 20, 1975 – January 17, 1983 Serving with Joe McKinnon (1975–1981), Mitch Abood (1981–1983)
- Preceded by: Redistricted
- Succeeded by: Redistricted (Note: Redistricting shifted her into the 11th district, where she lost reelection to Mae Tischer.)

Personal details
- Born: Thelma Juana Garcia; August 1, 1934 Claveria, Cagayan, Philippine Islands
- Died: November 5, 2007 (aged 73) Anchorage, Alaska, U.S.
- Party: Democratic
- Spouse: Jon Buchholdt
- Education: Mount St. Mary's College (B.A.); District of Columbia School of Law (J.D.)

Thelma Garcia Buchholdt (August 1, 1934 – November 5, 2007) was a Filipino American community activist, politician, historian, public speaker, cultural worker, and author. She was elected to the Alaska House of Representatives for four consecutive terms, from 1974 through 1982. She was the author of the book Filipinos in Alaska: 1788-1958, which is now in its third printing and is available through the Anchorage Museum at Rasmuson Center.

== Early life and education ==
Thelma Jean Garcia was born and raised in the small fishing village of Claveria, Cagayan, Philippines. She was the first of six children born to Eugenio Manalo Garcia and Dionisia de Leon. Her father was of mixed tribal heritage including Aeta and Ibanag, whose family came from Calanasan, Apayao. Her mother was of Ilocano heritage, whose ancestors came from Vigan, Ilocos Sur, and from the towns of Laoag and Bangui in Ilocos Norte province.

Her formal education began at the Academy of St. Joseph in Claveria, Cagayan. Because her education was interrupted by World War II, she did not attend school regularly until the age of 10.

When she was 15 years old, Thelma was enrolled at Mount St. Mary's College in Brentwood, Los Angeles, California. She was able to do this through the sponsorship of her maternal uncle Fermin de Leon, who was based in Las Vegas, Nevada. She earned a Bachelor of Arts degree in 1956, majoring in Zoology. On October 6, 1996, Mount St. Mary's College awarded her the 1996 Outstanding Alumna Award for Community Service.

She was also enrolled in graduate studies at a Las Vegas-based extension of the University of Nevada, which later became the University of Nevada, Las Vegas.

In 1988, immediately after her youngest child graduated from college, Thelma enrolled in the District of Columbia School of Law in Washington, D.C. She and her husband enrolled together, and earned their law degrees in 1991. They were both subsequently admitted to the Alaska Bar Association.

== Political career ==
In the late 1960s in Anchorage, Alaska, Thelma Buchholdt became involved in politics as a member of the Ad Hoc Committee of Young Democrats. In 1969, she was selected to attend a conference titled "On the Future of Alaska", held by the Brookings Institution in Washington, D.C., in 1974, she was elected to the Alaska House Of Representatives.

She ran for the Anchorage School Board and lost in a surprisingly close race for a first-time candidate. George McGovern named her the Alaska coordinator for his 1972 presidential campaign. After her work on the McGovern campaign, in 1974 Thelma was elected to the Alaska House of Representatives as an Ad Hoc Democrat. She was subsequently re-elected to the Alaskan legislature in 1976, 1978, and 1980.

She was the first female Filipino American legislator in the United States of America.

She was also the first Filipino American elected to a United States legislative body by a constituency which was less than 3% Asian American and less than 1% Filipino American.

== Personal life ==
She met her husband of 50 years, Jon Buchholdt (né Yorgason), while studying in Las Vegas. They raised four children, and she is survived by six grandchildren.

She was a member of the Alaska Bar Association, and practiced law as a member of the Buchholdt Law Offices, located in Anchorage.

She was the founder of the Filipino Heritage Council of Alaska, Inc., and coordinated its presentations of Filipino-Alaskan and Filipino cultural shows in Anchorage, Juneau, Kodiak, and Barrow, Alaska. She also coordinated the 1st Statewide Filipino Community Leadership Conference, held April 21 through 26, 1980 in Juneau, Alaska. A second Statewide Filipino Community Leadership Conference was held in 1981 in Anchorage, Alaska.

She was the founder of the Alaska chapter of the Filipino American National Historical Society, and she served as a trustee and officer of National FANHS. She was the first three-term national president of FANHS.

== Death and legacy ==
Buchholdt died of pancreatic cancer on November 5, 2007, at her home in Anchorage.

November 10, 2007 was proclaimed Thelma Buchholdt Day by Alaska Governor Sarah Palin.

The Anchorage Municipal Assembly and Anchorage Mayor Mark Begich passed a joint resolution recognizing July 5, 2008 as Thelma Buchholdt Day "In Celebration of Thelma's Life Time Commitment to Public Service that Upholds Social Justice and the Great Values of Cultural Diversity and Respect for All Peoples."

Her life was one full of "firsts":

- she was a founder of the Boys and Girls Clubs of Alaska (1966)
- she was the first female to be elected President of the Filipino Community of Anchorage, Alaska, Inc. (1973)
- she was the first Asian American elected to the Alaska State Legislature (1974)
- she was the first Filipino American legislator in the United States, outside of Hawaii (1974)
- she was the first Philippine-born woman elected to serve in a United States legislature (1974)
- she founded and coordinated the Filipino Heritage Council of Alaska, Inc. (1975)
- she initiated funding (1980) and was a founder as well as the first president of the Asian Alaskan Cultural Center, the first cross-cultural center of its kind in Alaska (1983)
- she was the first Asian American elected to serve as President of the National Order of Women Legislators (1987)
- she founded the Alaska chapter of the Filipino American National Historical Society (1994)

In 2008, Thelma Buchholdt was awarded the James "Jim" Doogan Lifetime Achievement Award by the Alaska Democratic Party. On June 24, 2008, the City of Anchorage recognized July 5, 2008 as Thelma Buchholdt Day.

On March 6, 2009, she was inducted into the Alaska Women's Hall of Fame in recognition of her long-term, significant contribution to Alaska.

The "Thelma G. Buchholdt Picnic Shelter" was erected in 2010 at Woodland Park, near her Anchorage home.
