= Angela Russell (politician) =

American politician from Montana

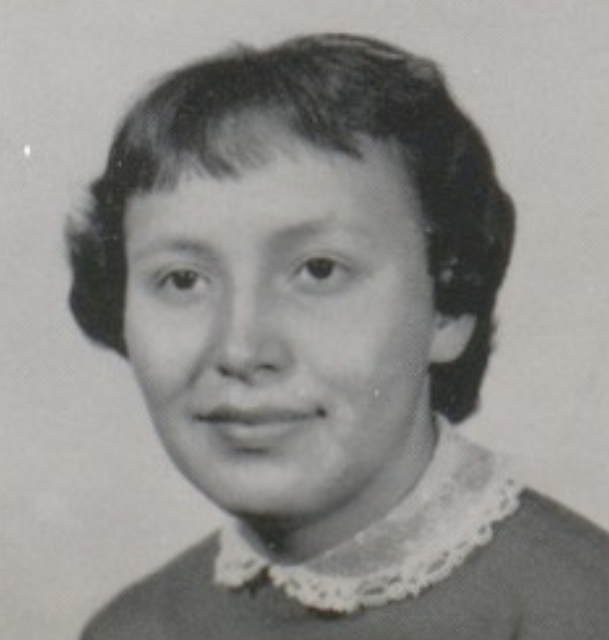
- Angela Russell in 1960

Member of the Montana House of Representatives from the 99th district
- In office 1987–1995
- Preceded by: Ramona Howe

Personal details
- Born: 1943 (age 82–83)
- Party: Democratic Party
- Education: University of Montana (BA); Tulane University (MA)

Angela Veta Russell (born 1943) is an American politician and civil rights activist who served in the Montana House of Representatives from the 99th district as a member of the Democratic Party. Russell participated in the Selma to Montgomery marches and Native American activism. She is a member of the Crow Tribe of Montana.

== Early life ==
Angela Veta Russell was born in 1943. She graduated from Hardin High School in 1961. She graduated from the University of Montana with a bachelor's degree in anthropology and sociology, and later graduated in 1974, from Tulane University with a master's degree in social work and counseling.

== Career ==
=== Activism ===
In 1965, Russell participated in the Selma to Montgomery marches. While attending Montana State University she served as executive secretary of the Northwest Regional Indian Youth Conference. In 1972, Russell was elected to the Crow Tribe's health, education, and welfare committee from the off-reservation district with 14 votes.

During the 1970s and 1980s she served as a member and chair of the Montana Advisory Committee to the United States Commission on Civil Rights.

=== Montana House of Representatives ===
==== Elections ====
In 1986, Russell filed to run for the Democratic nomination for a seat in the Montana House of Representatives from the 99th district. During the primary Patrick Hill, her only opponent, withdrew while incumbent Representative Ramona Howe chose to not seek reelection. She won in the general election against Republican nominee Reinhold Jabs.

On March 4, 1988, Russell filed to run for reelection to the Montana House of Representatives and won in the general election without opposition. In 1990, she filed for reelection and defeated Republican nominee Ellis Murdock in the general election. On March 18, 1992, she filed for reelection and defeated Republican nominee Murdock in the general election.

On March 23, 1994, Russell filed to run for a seat in the Montana Senate from the 3rd district, but was defeated in the general election by Republican nominee Reiny Jabs.

==== Tenure ====
During the 1987–1989 session of the Montana House of Representatives Russell served on the Natural Resources, and Human Service and Aging committees. In 1988, she was appointed to serve as the chair of the Labor committee.

In 1989, she became the chair of the Democratic Women's Caucus in the Montana House of Representatives. In 1994, she was appointed as one of eighteen members of the Montana Human Rights Advisory Council by Governor Marc Racicot.

Legislation to designate English as the official language of Montana was introduced in 1987. Russell criticized the legislation stating that "native peoples perceive it as racist" and that for Native Americans "our language is the conduit, the lifeblood of our history". In 1991, she introduced legislation to create a holiday to honor Martin Luther King Jr.

== Later life ==
From 2004 to 2009, Angela served as a Crow Tribal Court Judge. In 2015, Russell was appointed by Governor Steve Bullock to the Montana Board of Crime Control. In 2019, she was appointed to the Montana Board of Crime Control by Bullock.

During the 2018 United States Senate election in Montana Russell supported incumbent Senator Jon Tester and criticized A.J. Not Afraid, the chairman of the Crow Tribe of Montana, for endorsing Matt Rosendale.

== See also ==
- List of Native American politicians
- Native American women in politics
