= Tara Sweeney =

American politician (born 1973)

- Katuk
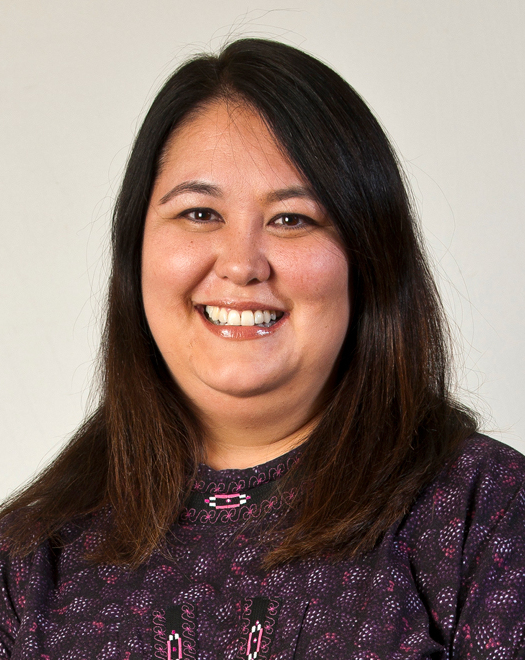
- Sweeney in 2018

13th Assistant Secretary of the Interior for Indian Affairs
- In office July 9, 2018 – January 20, 2021
- President: Donald Trump
- Preceded by: Kevin K. Washburn
- Succeeded by: Bryan Newland

Personal details
- Born: Tara Katuk MacLean; July 28, 1973 (age 53)
- Party: Republican
- Spouse: Michael Sweeney
- Children: 2
- Relatives: Eileen MacLean (mother)
- Education: Cornell University (BS)

Tara MacLean Sweeney (born July 28, 1973) is an Iñupiat businesswoman and former political appointee who served as assistant secretary of the interior for Native American affairs from July 2018 to January 2021. Sweeney is an Alaska Native and previously served in the cabinet of Alaska Governor Frank Murkowski. In 2022, she unsuccessfully ran to represent Alaska in the United States House of Representatives. The election was won by Democrat Mary Peltola.

== Early life and education ==
A daughter of Bryan MacLean, a teacher, and Eileen MacLean (née Panigeo), who served as a Democratic member of the Alaska Legislature, she is of Iñupiaq descent. She is a citizen of the Native Village of Barrow Inupiat Traditional Government. One of her ancestors translated the Bible into the Inupiaq language.

Sweeney grew up in the towns of Wainwright, Bethel, Unalakleet, and Utqiagvik in rural Alaska. In 1991, she graduated from Barrow High School.

Sweeney attended Cornell University, where she received a Bachelor of Science degree in industrial and labor relations in 1998.

== Business career ==
For almost two decades she has worked for Arctic Slope Regional Corporation (ASRC) with subsidiaries, in various positions. The last was as Executive Vice President of External Affair, serving as the company's spokesperson. In this capacity, she advocated for opening the Arctic National Wildlife Refuge for oil drilling. She has a birthright co-ownership in the company.

In October 2013, Sweeney started a one-year term as co-chair of the Alaska Federation of Natives. From 2015 to 2017, Sweeney served as chair of the Arctic Economic Council as a representative of the Inuit Circumpolar Council.

== Political and government career ==
In 2003, Sweeney joined the cabinet of Alaska Governor Frank Murkowski as Special Assistant for Rural Affairs and Education.

During the 2014 United States Senate election in Alaska, Sweeney served as co-chair of Republican Dan Sullivan's Senate campaign. She said that the Democratic Senate majority "feverishly worked on an agenda that stifled growth and economic opportunities in Alaska".

As Assistant Secretary, Sweeney wrote an op-ed endorsing Sullivan's reelection in 2020. She said that Sullivan's opponent Al Gross, who ran as an independent but was endorsed by the Democratic Party, supported "national Democrats' own radical, anti-Alaska agenda".

=== Bureau of Indian Affairs ===
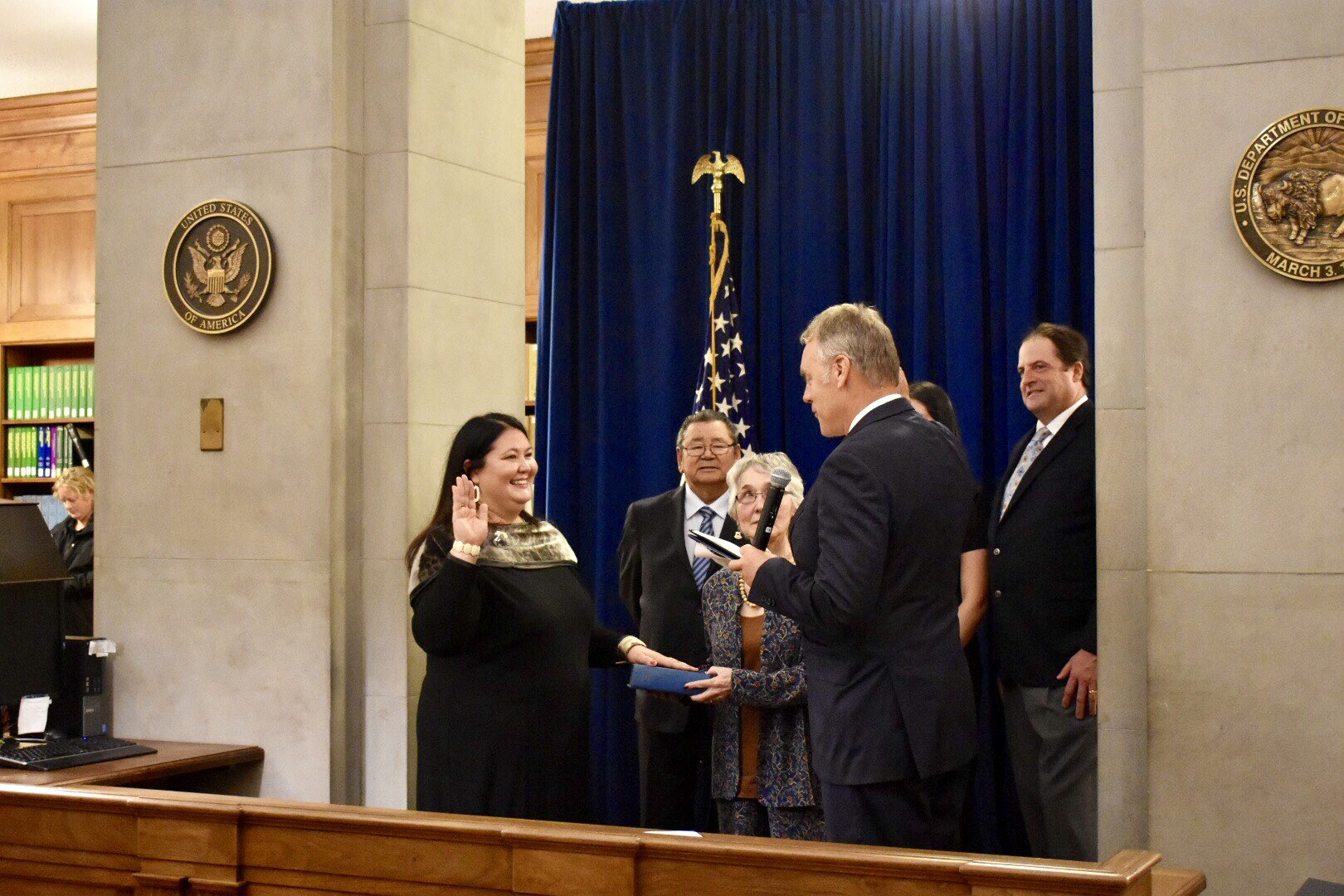
Tara Sweeney being sworn in for her role at the Bureau of Indian Affairs.

In October 2017, Sweeney was nominated by President Donald Trump as assistant secretary for Indian affairs. The Senate Committee on Indian Affairs unanimously recommended a full vote in the Senate, and she was unanimously confirmed in June 2018. During her confirmation hearing, she pledged to recuse herself from issues involving the Arctic Slope Regional Corporation. She is the first Alaska Native and second woman to oversee the Bureau of Indian Affairs.

As assistant secretary, she faced calls for her resignation during the COVID-19 crisis. She had proposed that federal stimulus funds earmarked for tribal governments should also be available to the for-profit Alaska Native-owned corporations. On April 28, 2020 a federal district court blocked the inclusion of Alaska Native-owned corporations from receiving federal stimulus money earmarked for tribal governments. The Supreme Court heard the case on appeal. In June 2021, it reversed the lower court's decision, ruling that the 12 Alaska Native Regional Corporations were eligible for the CARES Act funding along with the tribes.

=== 2022 congressional elections ===
In 2022, after U.S. Congressman Don Young's death in office, Sweeney was one of many candidates to file to run both in the special election (to be completed in August 2022) to complete the remainder of his unexpired term, and the subsequent regularly scheduled election to be held in November for a full-term.

The special election was the first under Alaska's new election system of ranked choice or instant runoff voting. A nonpartisan primary election was the first step in determining the top four finishers who would advance to a general election. This system was also used in the November election.

Some news outlets described Sweeney as a moderate Republican candidate. Iris Samuels of The Anchorage Daily News described her as running, "on a pro-development, socially moderate platform, saying she supports abortion access." Sweeney received support from the largest Alaska Native corporations.

Sweeney finished fifth in the primary election for the special election. After fourth-place primary finisher Al Gross withdrew his candidacy from the special election, there was an effort to have Sweeney replace him on the general election ballot. The Division of Elections issued a ruling that Sweeney could not be placed on the ballot for the special general election because Gross had withdrawn within 64 days of the election. This ruling survived a challenge before the Alaska Supreme Court. Sweeney did not protest the outcome.

Sweeney instead ran as a write-in candidate in the special general election. Her write-in effort in the August 16, 2022 special general election was unsuccessful.

On August 16, 2022, Sweeney placed a distant fourth in the nonpartisan primary for the regularly scheduled election, thus qualifying for the November general election. She received less than 4% of the vote in this primary. Believing that her weak finish indicated a lack of a viable path to victory in the general election and citing fundraising difficulties, Sweeney soon ended her candidacy.

== Personal life ==
Sweeney is married to Kevin Sweeney, a former aide to Senator Lisa Murkowski. The couple has two children and lives in Anchorage.

She had a role in the 2011 film On the Ice. The couple's son Ahmaogak had a role in the 2012 film Big Miracle.

== See also ==
- List of Native American politicians
- Native American women in politics
