= Reggie Joule =

American politician

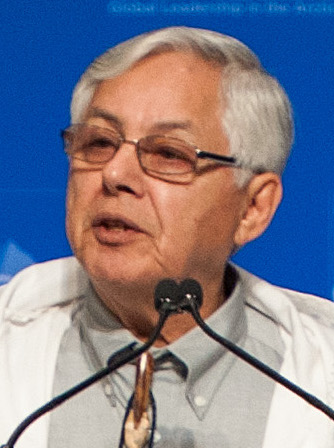
- Joule in 2015

Mayor of Northwest Arctic Borough
- In office October 2012 – October 2015
- Preceded by: Martha Whiting
- Succeeded by: Clement Richards Sr.

Member of the Alaska House of Representatives from the 40th district
- In office January 13, 1997 – October 2012
- Preceded by: Don Long
- Succeeded by: Benjamin Nageak

Personal details
- Born: July 14, 1952 (age 74) Nome, Alaska
- Party: Democratic
- Spouse: Linda
- Education: University of Alaska Fairbanks

Reginald L. "Reggie" Joule, Jr. (born July 14, 1952) is a politician in the U.S. state of Alaska. Between 2012 and 2015, Joule served a three-year term as mayor of the Northwest Arctic Borough. He announced his intention to retire from public service at the end of his term.

Joule had previously served as a Democratic member of the Alaska House of Representatives, representing the 40th District from 1997 to 2012.

== Legislature ==
Before the beginning of the 26th Legislature in January 2008, Joule, along with "bush" Democrats Bryce Edgmon and Bob Herron, began caucusing with the Republicans in the House Majority Caucus. In the House, Joule served as a member of the Finance Committee. He also chaired both the Department of Health & Social Services and Environmental Conservation Finance Subcommittee and served on the University Of Alaska Finance Subcommittee. He was a member of the Special Committee on Economic Development, Trade & Tourism and the Joint Committee on Education Funding District Cost Factor for the 27th Legislature.

== Mayoralty ==
While serving as the mayor of the Northwest Arctic Borough, Joule was appointed by President Obama to the US President's State, Local, Tribal Leaders Task Force on Climate Preparedness and Resilience. In his capacity as mayor, he was happy to welcome the first official and historic visit of the US President to the Alaskan Arctic to see firsthand the impacts of climate change on villages and advocate for local preparations and involvement. He chose to step down after one term and was succeeded by Clement Richards Sr. At present, Joule also serves on the Advisory Board of the UK-based 'Polar Regions' think-tank Polar Research and Policy Initiative.

== Personal life ==
Joule has a wife, Linda, and five children: Lovisa, Reggie III, Angela, Dawn and Puyuk. Joule graduated from Copper Valley High School (a defunct Jesuit-run boarding school in Glennallen) in 1970 and attended the University of Alaska Fairbanks from 1970 to 1972.

Before being elected to office, Joule was a building maintenance and construction contractor. Joule is also well known as a top competitor in the World Eskimo Indian Olympics. He is a former nalukataq (blanket toss) champion, and appeared on The Tonight Show to discuss the game. As a result of his accomplishments therein, he was inducted into the 2010 class of the Alaska Sports Hall of Fame.

Joule made two appearances on The Tonight Show Starring Johnny Carson. He appeared on August 1, 1973, and again on June 24, 1983. Both appearances were to demonstrate the skills he used in the World Eskimo Indian Olympics.

== See also ==
- Arctic Winter Games – Joule participated in the first AWG in 1970 and met his wife there
- List of Native American politicians
- Politics of the United States
