= George Hohman =

American teacher and politician

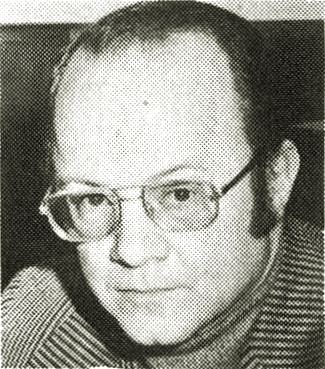

Member of the Alaska House of Representatives from the 14th district
- In office January 23, 1967 – January 8, 1973
- Preceded by: Raymond C. Christiansen
- Succeeded by: Phillip Guy (as the 15th district)

Member of the Alaska Senate from the M district H district (1973–1975)
- In office January 8, 1973 – February 5, 1982
- Preceded by: Raymond C. Christiansen (as the K district)
- Succeeded by: Nels A. Anderson Jr.

Personal details
- Born: George Harold Hohman Jr. June 2, 1932 St. Louis, Missouri
- Died: November 20, 2006 (aged 74) Anchorage, Alaska
- Party: Democratic
- Education: Michigan State University
- Occupation: School teacher

George Harold Hohman, Jr. (June 2, 1932 – November 20, 2006) was an American teacher and Alaskan politician.

== Biography ==
Born in St. Louis, Missouri, Hohman moved with his family to Glennie, Michigan and then graduated from high school in Oscoda, Michigan in 1950. In 1952, Hohman served in the United States Army and studied the Russian language. In 1954, Hohman was sent to Fort Richardson in Alaska to study the Russian language and how this influenced the Native Alaskan language.

After his service in the United States Army, Hohman graduated from Michigan State University. In 1962, he moved back to Alaska and settled in Bethel, Alaska where he became a teacher.

From 1967 to 1973, Hohman served in the Alaska House of Representatives and was a Democrat. Then, from 1973 to 1981, Hohman served in the Alaska State Senate.

In 1981, he was accused of accepting a bribe to use his influence to get state appropriations to buy a CL215 water-bomber aircraft for fighting forest fires. He was also charged with attempting to bribe State Representative Russ Meekins Jr., to assist him. Hohman Jr. was found guilty of felonious bribery and receiving a bribe and was sentenced to 3 years in prison with two years suspended and fined $30,000. As a convicted felon he was expelled from the Alaska Senate.

Hohman died from cancer at a hospital in Anchorage, Alaska.
