= Collette Brown =

American politician

Member of the North Dakota House of Representatives from the 9th district
- Incumbent
- Assumed office December 1, 2024

Personal details
- Party: Democratic-NPL

Collette Brown is a Native American politician serving as a member of the North Dakota House of Representatives from the 9th district. She is a member of the Democratic-NPL. Brown is a member of the Spirit Lake Tribe. She is the Great Plains Representative for the Indian Gaming Association and for the National Tribal Gaming Commissioners & Regulators.

== See also ==
- List of Native American politicians
- Native American women in politics
