= Andrew Hope (politician) =

American politician (1896–1968)

Member of the Alaska House of Representatives
- In office 1959–1963

Personal details
- Born: 1896 Sitka, Alaska
- Died: 1968 (aged 71–72)

Andrew Percy Hope (1896 – 1968) was an American politician in Alaska, from the Tlingit tribe.

== Biography ==
Hope was born in 1896, in Sitka, Alaska. He served on the City Council of Sitka from 1924 to 1936. He served seven terms in the Alaska House of Representatives and served in the first and second Alaska Territorial Legislature.

== See also ==
- List of Native American politicians
