= Fred Brown (Alaska politician) =

American politician

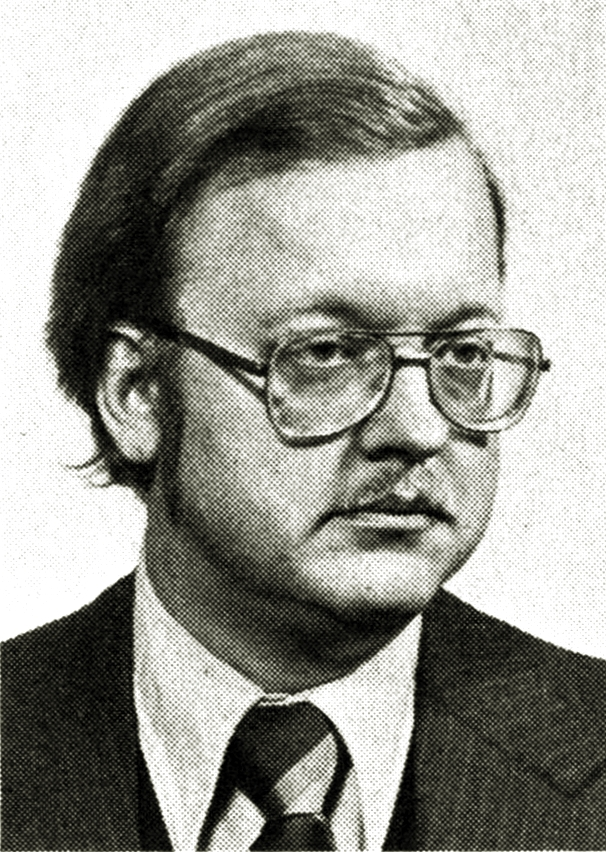
Fred Brown in 1977

Frederic Emil "Fred" Brown (July 9, 1943 – June 27, 2014) was an American attorney, electrical engineer, and politician.

Fred Brown was born in Anchorage, Alaska on July 9, 1943. He moved with his family to Fairbanks, Alaska while still an infant, where he resided for the remainder of his life. Brown graduated from Lathrop High School. He then received his bachelor's degree from the University of Alaska and his master's degree from Stanford University, both in electrical engineering. In 1969, Brown received his law degree from Columbia University School of Law and practiced law in Fairbanks, Alaska. Brown served in the Alaska House of Representatives from 1975 to 1983 as a Democrat. He was married to Helen Brown. He died in Fairbanks at age 70.
