= Kathryn Poland =

American politician

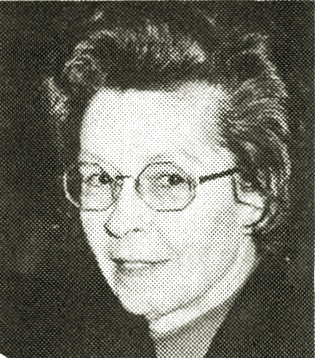
Kay Poland

Kathryn E. "Kay" (née Kennedy) Poland Silides (October 12, 1919 – September 3, 2010) was an American businesswoman and politician.

Born in Portland, Oregon, Poland moved with her family to Anchorage, Alaska. Poland graduated from Palmer High School in Palmer, Alaska in 1937. She went to the University of Washington and Moravian College. Poland and her husband Bill M. Poland lived in Kodiak, Alaska. She worked as a bookkeeper. In 1970, Poland was appointed to the Alaska Senate when her husband Bill Poland resigned from the office after suffering a major heart attack. Her second husband was George Silides. She served until 1978 and was a Democrat. Poland died at the Anchorage Pioneer House in Anchorage, Alaska.
