= Karina Walters =

American social epidemiologist

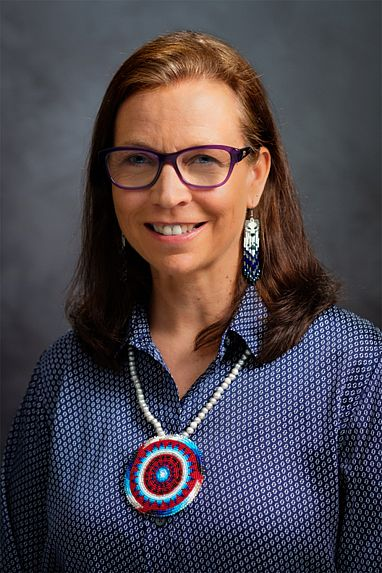
- Born: Karina Lynn Walters; April 18, 1964 (age 62); Los Angeles, California, U.S.
- Citizenship: American; Choctaw
- Education: University of California, Los Angeles (BS, MSW, PhD)
- Scientific career
- Fields: Social epidemiology, health promotion, Health of Native Americans in the United States
- Workplaces: Columbia University School of Social Work; University of Washington School of Social Work; National Institutes of Health
- Thesis: Urban American Indian Identity and Psychological Wellness (1995)

Karina Lynn Walters (born April 18, 1964) is a Choctaw-American social epidemiologist, health promotion scholar, and former psychotherapist. She is the director of the Tribal Health Research Office at the National Institutes of Health. Walters was a professor and the Katherine Hall Chambers Scholar at the University of Washington School of Social Work.

== Life ==
Walters was born on April 18, 1964 in Los Angeles, California and is an enrolled member of the Choctaw Nation of Oklahoma. She earned a Bachelor of Arts in sociology from the University of California, Los Angeles (UCLA) in 1987. Walters then completed a Master of Social Work (clinical) in social welfare in 1990 at UCLA. She worked as a psychotherapist. From 1993 to 1995, she was appointed by mayors Tom Bradley and Richard Riordan as commissioner for the Los Angeles County American Indian Commission. In 1995, Walters earned a Doctor of Philosophy in social welfare from UCLA. Her dissertation was titled Urban American Indian Identity and Psychological Wellness. Rosina Becerra was her dissertation chair.

Walters is a social epidemiology and health promotion scholar. Her early social epidemiological research involved LGBT, two-spirit, and urban American Indian and Alaska Native (AI/AN) populations across the United States. She was an assistant and later associate professor at the Columbia University School of Social Work from 1995 to 2001. Walters joined the faculty at the University of Washington School of Social Work in 2001. She was promoted to full professor in 2011. Walters was the director of the doctoral program from 2003 to 2005. She served from 2012 to 2019 as the associate dean for research at the University of Washington School of Social Work, overseeing and assisting faculty in generating $20–30 million in grants annually. Walter was a tenured full professor and the Katherine Hall Chambers Scholar. She was an adjunct professor in the department of global health and the University of Washington School of Public Health. She was the founding director of the University of Washington Indigenous Wellness Research Institute.

As of 2023, Walters has over 28 years of AI/AN health research experience. She conducted social epidemiological research on the environmental, historical, social, and cultural determinants of health and health equity of AI/AN communities as well as designed and empirically tested, tribally derived chronic disease prevention interventions. Walters has conducted tribal-based intervention research in the areas of substance use disorders, obesity prevention and physical activity promotion, diabetes and depression, and HIV prevention. She has served as an National Institutes of Health (NIH) principal investigator or co-investigator on 35 NIH awards from multiple NIH Institutes. She is the first American Indian fellow inducted into the American Academy of Social Work and Social Welfare.

On March 16, 2023, Walters was selected to lead the NIH Tribal Health Research Office (THRO). She succeeded acting director Robin Kawazoe on April 24, 2023.
