= Eileen MacLean =

American politician and educator

Member of the Alaska House of Representatives
- In office 1989 – January 12, 1996

Personal details
- Born: Eileen Panigeo; June 12, 1949 Utqiaġvik, Alaska Territory
- Died: April 24, 1996 (aged 46) Utqiaġvik, Alaska
- Party: Democratic
- Children: Tara Sweeney
- Education: University of Alaska, Fairbanks (BA); University of Copenhagen (MEd)

Eileen Panigeo MacLean (June 12, 1949 – April 24, 1996) was an Iñupiaq American politician and educator. She served as a member of the Alaska House of Representatives from 1989 to 1996. She represented North Slope Borough, Alaska.

== Early life and education ==
MacLean was born in Utqiaġvik, Alaska Territory, and was Iñupiaq. She graduated from Mt. Edgecumbe High School, in Sitka, Alaska, in 1968.

MacLean received her bachelor's degree in elementary education from University of Alaska Fairbanks in 1975 and her master's degree in education from University of Copenhagen in 1983.

== Career ==
MacLean worked as a junior high school teacher and was involved in the real estate business. MacLean served on the North Slope Borough Assembly and on the North Slope School Board. She was a Democrat.

MacLean was elected to and served in the Alaska House of Representatives from 1989 until her resignation on January 12, 1996, due to health problems. Before that she was on the executive board of the Inuit Circumpolar Conference and the Arctic Slope Regional Corporation. MacLean was also an executive director of the Alaska Eskimo Whaling Commission.

== Personal life ==
She had a daughter is Tara Sweeney, an activist and businesswoman. MacLean died at her home in Utqiaġvik after a long illness.

== See also ==
- List of Native American politicians
- Native American women in politics
