= Wilma Victor =

Native American educator (1919–1987)

Special Assistant to the Secretary of the Interior
- In office 1971–1975
- President: Richard Nixon; Gerald Ford

Personal details
- Born: Wilma Louise Victor; November 5, 1919 Idabel, Oklahoma, U.S.
- Died: November 15, 1987 (aged 68) Idabel, Oklahoma, U.S.
- Party: Republican
- Education: University of Kansas; Milwaukee State Teachers College (BS)

Military service
- Allegiance: United States of America
- Branch/service: United States Army
- Years of service: 1943–1946
- Rank: First Lieutenant
- Unit: Women's Army Corps

Wilma Louise Victor (November 5, 1919 – November 15, 1987) was a Choctaw educator and Native American rights activist. She served in various teaching positions before beginning federal service in the 1970s.

== Biography ==
A full-blood Choctaw, Wilma Victor was born in Idabel, Oklahoma, on November 5, 1919. A friend of hers was employed at the Federal Bureau of Indian Affairs (BIA) and arranged for her to receive a scholarship to attend the University of Kansas for two years. BIA education director Willard Beatty encouraged her to enter a career in teaching and helped her get a scholarship for the Milwaukee State Teachers College, where she received her Bachelor of Science degree.

Victor started her career as an apprentice teacher at Shiprock Boarding School in Shiprock, New Mexico.

Victor enlisted in the Army in 1943 and served in the Women's Army Corps during World War II. She served as a first lieutenant until 1946. She taught at Idabel High School for two years. After that she secured a teaching position Intermountain Indian School, an off-reservation boarding school in Brigham City, Utah.

Victor taught at Intermountain for 13 years and co-founded the Institute of American Indian Arts. She was named Principal of the institute in 1962. She spearheaded the development of the institution's curriculum, which had a focus on Native art traditions. She was promoted to superintendent of Intermountain Indian School on April 7, 1964.

She worked at the Intermountain Indian School from 1940 to 1960 and from 1964 to 1970.

From 1961 to 1964, Victor was principal of Santa Fe's Institute of American Indian Arts.

Victor was one of six women selected a Federal Woman's Award in 1967. She was recognized for her "exceptional creative and executive ability in the administration of a unique and complex school program for disadvantaged Indian youth". Victor was also a member of the Council for Exceptional Children, the Utah State Conference on Social Welfare, and the Governor of Utah's Commission on Indian Affairs. She was recipient of the Indian Achievement Award in 1970. The State of Utah also named Victor one of "seven women of the 70s." At the first National Indian Workshop for Indian Affairs she was a keynote speaker.

In 1971, Victor was appointed special assistant to Secretary of the Interior Rogers Morton. At the time, she was the highest ranking Native American woman in government. She advised the secretary on Indian affairs. That year, Victor was accused by both the American Indian Movement and Navajo chairman Peter MacDonald of "attempted to stop all reforms in the BIA which were aimed at giving Natives more self-determination." Steve Nickeson, a writer with the National Indian Youth Council, described her as "a conservative, politically influential charter member of the Haskell Mafia."

Victor departed her post in the DOI in 1975, and died on November 15, 1987, in Idabel.

== See also ==
- List of Native American politicians
- Native American women in politics
