= Alfred Nakak =

American politician (born 1947)

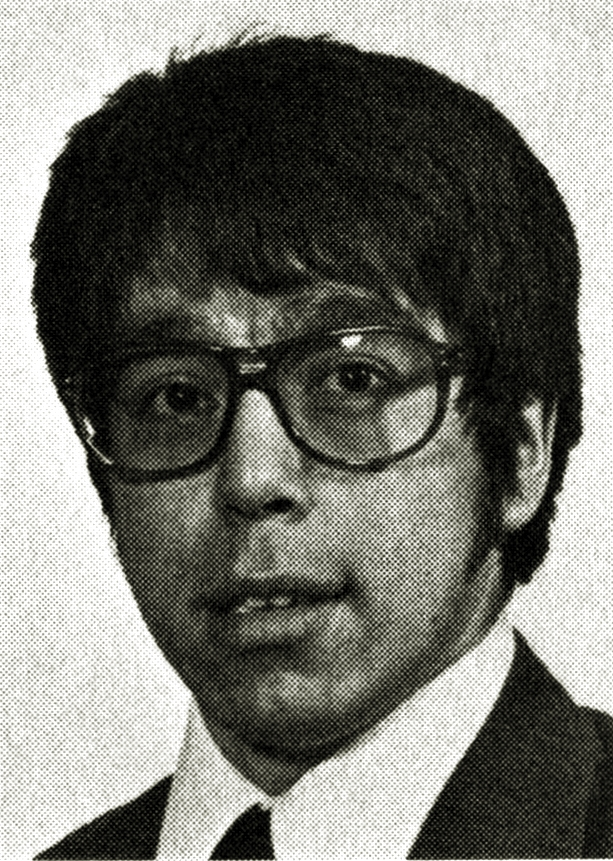

Member of the Alaska House of Representatives from the 22nd district
- In office January 3, 1977 – January 2, 1979
- Preceded by: Larry T. Davis
- Succeeded by: John G. Fuller

Personal details
- Born: December 16, 1947 Nome, Alaska
- Died: December 19, 2000 (aged 53) St. Michael, Alaska
- Party: Democratic
- Spouse: Pauline Nakak

Alfred Charles Kourak "Al" Nakak (born December 16, 1947) was an American politician and a Democratic member of the Alaska House of Representatives during the Tenth State Legislature representing District 22.

== Personal life ==
Alfred Nakak was born in Nome, Alaska and raised in St. Michael, Alaska. He studied political science at Columbia University and served in the Army National Guard.

== Political career ==
In 1972, Nakak was a write-in candidate for State Representative for Alaska's 20th district, but was defeated by Democrat Chuck Degnan.

In 1976, Nakak defeated Republican Bob Evans and Independent incumbent Larry T. Davis for State Representative for the 22nd district. He served on the Health, Education and Social Services Committee, the Rules Committee, and was Vice Chairman for the State Affairs Committee.

In 1978, Nakak lost the Democratic Primary to John G. Fuller.

Nakak later served as mayor of St. Michael, Alaska.

== See also ==
- List of Native American politicians
