= Curtis McDaniel =

American politician

Representative Curtis McDaniel
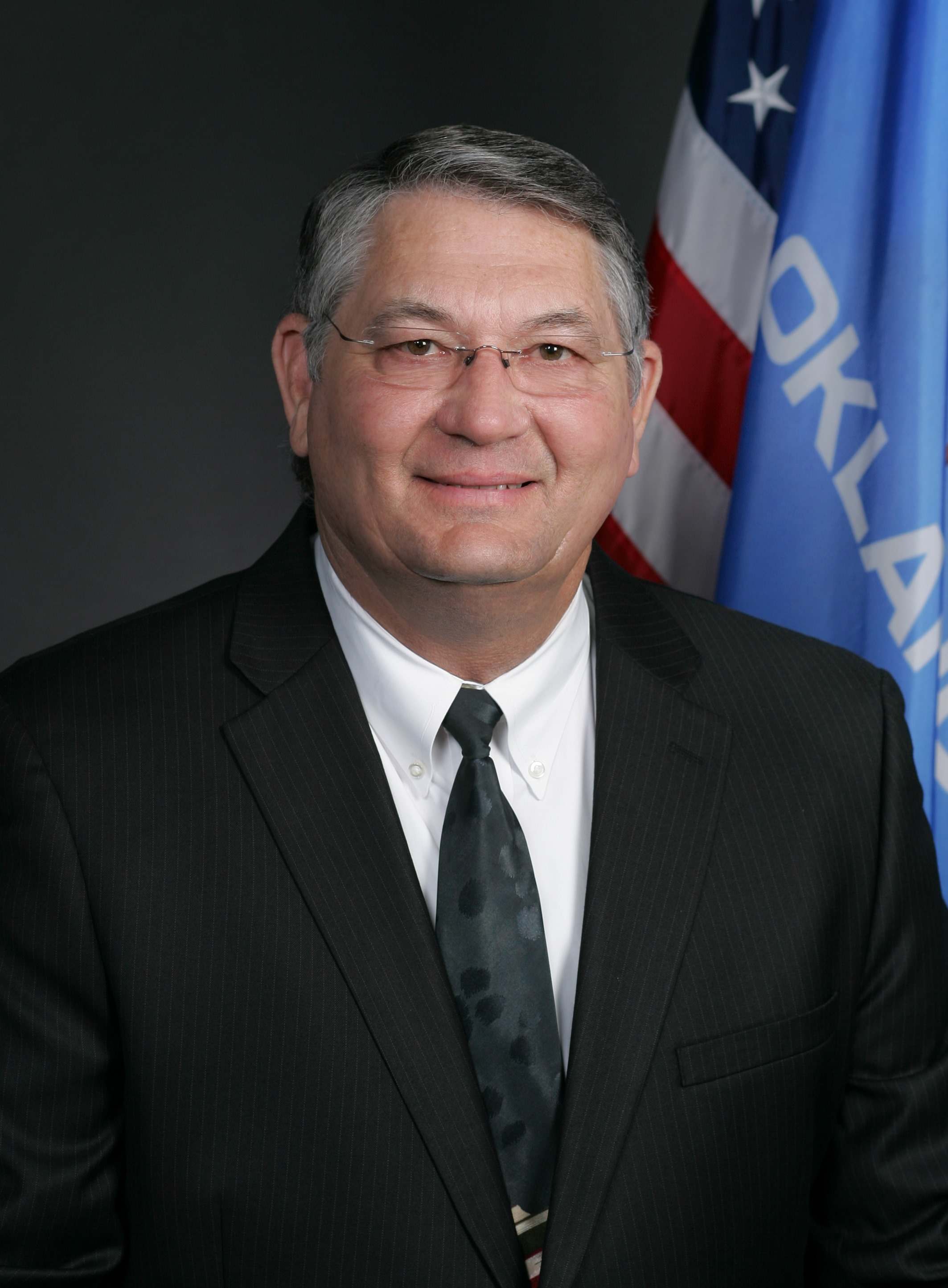

Member of the Oklahoma House of Representatives from the 1st district
- In office 2012–2014
- Preceded by: Rusty Farley
- Succeeded by: Johnny Tadlock

Personal details
- Born: 17 January 1952 (age 74) Hugo, Oklahoma
- Party: Democratic
- Spouse: Debbie
- Education: Oklahoma State University
- Profession: retired school administrator, auctioneer

Curtis McDaniel (born January 17, 1952) is a U.S. politician from the state of Oklahoma. McDaniel formerly served in the Oklahoma House of Representatives on behalf of District 1, which encompasses McCurtain County and the southern portion of LeFlore County.

On April 11, 2014, he filed to run for an Oklahoma Senate seat vacated by Jerry Ellis. He was defeated by Republican candidate Joseph Silk.

== Early life and career ==
Curtis McDaniel was born on January 17, 1952, in Hugo, Oklahoma.

He earned a bachelor's degree in agricultural education in 1975 from Oklahoma State University and a master's degree in public administration from Southeastern Oklahoma State University in 1998.

Prior to serving in the Oklahoma Legislature, he worked extensively in Oklahoma public schools, having worked as a vocational agriculture instructor at Oney, Helena-Gotry, Smithville and Newcastle Public Schools and as a principal for Smithville's elementary, middle school, and high school.

McDaniel has also worked as an auctioneer for OKC West Stockyards and as an employee of McDaniel Real Estate and Auction Company.

== Political career ==
Curtis McDaniel was elected to his first term in a special election in 2012 to fill the seat of a legislator who died. Since his election Curtis McDaniel has sought to enhance the areas of agriculture, education, and tourism for the state of Oklahoma. In 2013, McDaniel authored legislation to rename a highway passing through his district and proposed a measure to ban texting while driving which has been applauded by the state’s major newspaper.

=== Leadership and committee assignments ===
McDaniel served in the leadership role as the Minority Caucus Secretary and is a member of the following committees: Agriculture and Wildlife; A & B General Government; Common Education; Tourism & International Relations.

== District ==
District 1 is rural and includes McCurtain County, Oklahoma, which is made up of the following municipalities: Broken Bow, Eagletown, Garvin, Haworth, Idabel, Millerton, Smithville, Valliant and Wright City. It also includes the southern portion of LeFlore County, Oklahoma and the towns of Whitesboro, Muse, Page, and Stapp-Zoe.

== Memberships and affiliations ==
Elder at Panther Creek Christian Church

Founder of Oklahoma Club Calf Association

Chairman of Board for Kiamichi Career Tech Foundation

Board of Kiamichi Bible Institute

Co-Owner McDaniel Livestock Exchange (MLX)
