= Kathryn Ostrosky =

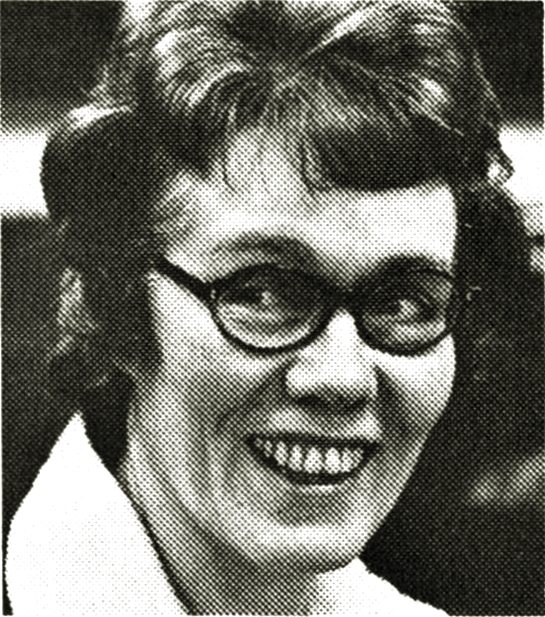
- Ostrosky, circa 1975

Member of the Alaska House of Representatives from the 7th district
- In office January 1975 – January 1977

Personal details
- Born: May 7, 1923 Rochester, New York
- Died: April 5, 1992 (aged 68) Anchorage, Alaska
- Party: Democratic
- Children: Zeck, d. 1968; Lori; Julianne

Kathryn Louise Baker Ostrosky (May 7, 1923 – April 5, 1992) was an American teacher and politician who served in the Alaska House of Representatives from 1975 to 1977.

== Biography ==
Ostrosky was born May 7, 1923 in Rochester, New York. She received her Bachelor of Arts from Heidelberg College. She taught in Highlands, North Carolina for three years, and was a member of the Congress of Racial Equality, participating in sit-ins during the Civil Rights Movement.

Ostrosky first moved to Alaska in 1954, working as a teacher in Tanana and Dillingham. She later moved to Naknek, where she met her husband, Hank Ostrosky. She was a member of the Bristol Bay School Board, and, alongside her husband Hank, ran the local newspaper Bristol Bay News.

In 1974, she was elected to the Alaska House of Representatives, as one of four members from the 7th district. She was a member of the National Order of Women Legislators and the League of Women Voters. She ran for re-election in 1976, but ultimately lost the Democratic primary election by just four votes following a recount.

After leaving politics, Ostrosky worked for the University of Alaska Anchorage. She died on April 5, 1992, at the age of 68. She was buried in Anchorage Memorial Park.
