= University of Washington School of Social Work =

Social work school of the University of Washington in Seattle, Washington, U.S.

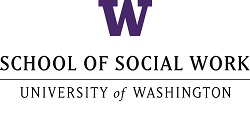
- Former names: Graduate School of Social Work (1934–1958)
- Type: Public
- Established: 1934 (graduate-level); 1958 (independent school)
- Parent institution: University of Washington
- Dean: Edwina Uehara
- Location: Seattle, Washington, United States; 47°39′26″N 122°18′45″W
- Campus: Urban
- Website: socialwork.uw.edu

The University of Washington School of Social Work is the social work school of the University of Washington, a public research university in Seattle, Washington.

The School is located in the University District neighborhood of Seattle, Washington adjacent to the main University of Washington campus. Beginning in the early 1900s, the School developed from a single course to an independent department accredited by the Council on Social Work Education.

== History ==
=== 1900s ===
In 1918, the University used Red Cross funding to establish a social casework course in the Department of Sociology in order to train caseworkers to provide services to families of servicemen returning from World War I. This represented the first formal social work training in the state of Washington.

=== 1930s ===
At the height of the Great Depression in 1934, UW established the graduate program at the School with funding from the Washington State Emergency Relief Association in response to the need for public agency social workers and administrators in the region. The School's graduate program became independent in 1934 under the direction of Arlien Johnson and was formally accredited by the Council on Social Work Education during the same year. Ernest Witte becomes the school's director in 1939, adopting a two-year masters program, and expanding the curriculum and fieldwork opportunities.

The School gained independent status as a professional school in 1958. The undergraduate program was established in 1959 and formally accredited by the Council on Social Work Education in 1975. The School officially added a doctoral program in 1975 and a three-year evening master's degree program in the 1980s.

== Research Centers ==
Current research centers include the Social Development Research Group, the Indigenous Wellness Research Institute, and Partners for Our Children.

== Partnerships ==
Since 2006, the School of Social Work has partnered with the Royal University of Phnom Penh in Cambodia to develop social work curriculum and train social work professionals to address pressing societal problems, following years of civil discord.

== Rankings and reputation ==
In 2024, the School was ranked 7th out of 319 schools for best graduate programs in social work by the U.S. News & World Report.

== See also ==
List of social work schools
