= Carl M. Morgan =

American politician (1950–2026)

Member of the Alaska House of Representatives
- In office 1999–2005

Personal details
- Born: January 21, 1950 Upper Kalskag, Alaska Territory, U.S.
- Died: August 2026 (aged 76)
- Party: Republican

Carl M. Morgan Jr. (January 21, 1950 – August 2026) was an American politician who was member of the Alaska House of Representatives from 1999 to 2005.

== Life and career ==
Carl M. Morgan Jr. was born in Upper Kalskag, Alaska Territory, on January 21, 1950. He served as mayor of Aniak and held leadership positions within the native community along the Kuskokwim River. Morgan was a member of the Alaska House of Representatives from 1999 to 2005. Morgan ran in 2012 for District 36.

Morgan died in August 2026, at the age of 76. Governor Mike Dunleavy and First Lady Rose Dunleavy were among those who paid tribute.

== See also ==
- List of Native American politicians
