= Frank L. Johnson =

American politician (1904–1977)

Frank Leslie Johnson (July 13, 1904 – September 25, 1977) was an American politician from the state of Alaska.

Born at Council, Alaska, Johnson was one of the first Alaska Natives elected to the territorial legislature in 1948 (along with Bill Beltz and Percy Ipalook). He served as a representative from 1949 to 1951. He was a mechanic from Nome, Alaska and also served as mayor of White Mountain, Alaska. He later moved to California after retiring from the Federal Aviation Administration in 1964, and died in San Jose on September 25, 1977.
