= Alvin Osterback =

American businessman, commercial fisherman, and politician

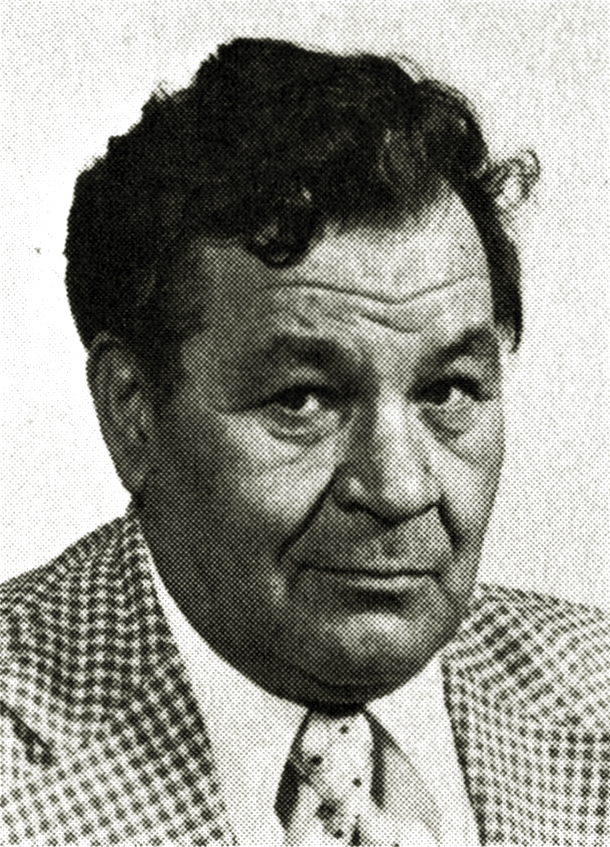
Osterback, 1977

Alvin Osterback (January 21, 1915 – November 24, 2005) was an American businessman, commercial fisherman, and politician.

Osterback was born on Wosnesenski Island, an island of the Aleutian Islands, Alaska. He went to high school in Unga, Alaska. Osterback served in the United States Army during World War II. He was a commercial fisher and was involved with home construction. Osterback served in the Alaska House of Representatives from 1974 until 1980 and was a Democrat. Osterback died at Mary Conrad Center assisted living in Anchorage, Alaska.
