= Sharon Stewart-Peregoy =

American politician (born 1953)

Member of the Montana House of Representatives from the 42nd district
- In office January 2, 2017 – January 6, 2025
- Preceded by: Carolyn Pease-Lopez
- Succeeded by: Sidney Fitzpatrick

Member of the Montana Senate from the 21st district
- In office January 5, 2009 – January 2, 2017
- Preceded by: Gerald Pease
- Succeeded by: Jason Small

Personal details
- Born: June 3, 1953 (age 73) Crow Agency, Montana, U.S.
- Party: Democratic
- Education: City University of Seattle

Sharon Stewart-Peregoy (born June 3, 1953) is an American politician from Montana. She served as a Democratic member of the Montana House of Representatives. She was first elected to the Montana House of Representatives in 2017. From 2009 to 2017, she served in Montana Senate, and represented Senate District 21, which included Crow Agency, Montana. She was a member of the Senate's American Indian Caucus. She received a Bachelor of Arts in elementary education from Montana State University and a Master of Education from City University at Seattle. She actively advocates for the revitalization of the Crow language and culture.

In 2009, Stewart-Peregoy became an adjunct professor at Little Big Horn College as a Crow Studies instructor and advocated for more use of the Crow language as part of the planning committee for a new cultural museum in 2021.

== Politics ==
Though the legislature's policy is to speak in English only, Stewart-Peregoy chose to be sworn in in the Crow language. She joined the American Indian Caucus, which at the time totaled nine members including Stewart-Peregoy.

In the legislature, Stewart-Peregoy has focused on topics including the disproportionate disappearance and domestic violence rates of Indigenous peoples in Montana.

Stewart-Peregoy has served on the following legislative committee assignments:

Senate:

- 2009: Agriculture, Livestock, and Irrigation; Business, Labor, and Economic Affairs; Energy and Telecommunications
- 2011: Agriculture, Livestock, and Irrigation (Vice Chair); Business, Labor, and Economic Affairs; Education and Cultural Resources
- 2013: Agriculture, Livestock, and Irrigation; Business, Labor, and Economic Affairs; Education and Cultural Resources; Ethics
- 2015: Agriculture, Livestock, and Irrigation; Business, Labor, and Economic Affairs; Education and Cultural Resources

House:

- 2017: Agriculture, Livestock, and Irrigation; Business, Labor, and Economic Affairs; Education and Cultural Resources
- 2019: Business and Labor (Vice Chair); Rules; Energy, Telecommunications, and Federal Relations; Fish, Wildlife, and Parks
- 2021: Appropriations; House Rules; General Government

== Early career and personal life ==
Prior to politics, Stewart-Peregoy worked in kindergarten and elementary education before becoming a research and development specialist for the tribe.

== See also ==
- List of Native American politicians
- Native American women in politics

Montana Senate
Preceded by Gerald Pease	Member of the Montana Senate from the 21st district 2009-2016	Succeeded by Jason Small
