= Percy Ipalook =

American politician (1906–1990)

Percy Panigroak Ipalook (April 2, 1906 – December 15, 1990) (Iñupiaq pronunciation: Piasi Panigruaq Ipaaluk) was an American politician and clergyman from the state of Alaska.

Born at Point Barrow, Alaska, Ipalook was Iñupiaq. He attended Sheldon Jackson Junior College in Sitka, Alaska and the University of Dubuque in Iowa. Ordained in 1941, he was a Presbyterian clergyman and missionary and served as a chaplain in the Alaska Territorial Guard. One of the first Alaska Natives elected to the territorial legislature in 1948 (along with Bill Beltz and Frank L. Johnson), he served as a representative from 1949 to 1951 and senator from 1951 to 1955. He served on the Alaska Statehood Committee from 1949 to 1959. Ipalook died in Kotzebue, Alaska in 1990.
