= Benjamin Nageak =

American politician

Benjamin P. Nageak

Member of the Alaska House of Representatives from the 40th district
- In office January 18, 2013 – January 17, 2017
- Preceded by: Reggie Joule
- Succeeded by: Dean Westlake

Personal details
- Born: March 26, 1950 (age 76) Kaktovik, Alaska, U.S.
- Party: Democratic

Benjamin P. Nageak (born March 26, 1950) (Iñupiaq pronunciation: Naġiaq) is an American politician, having been a Democratic member of the Alaska House of Representatives between January 18, 2013, and January 17, 2017, representing District 40.

== Political career ==
=== North Slope Borough ===
In the 1990s, Nageak was elected to the North Slope Borough assembly. A year into his term, he was elected the borough's mayor, and served in that position for a single three-year term from 1996 to 1999.

Prior to running for the Alaska House in 2012, Nageak was serving as a special assistant to the borough's mayor, Charlotte Brower.

=== Alaska House of Representatives ===
- In 2012 Nageak filed to run for the 40th District seat in the Alaska House of Representatives. Incumbent Democrat Reggie Joule announced shortly before the filing deadline that he would not be a candidate for reelection; he would later to decide to run for mayor of the Northwest Arctic Borough and was elected to that position. Nageak won the four-way August 28, 2012 Democratic Primary with 714 votes (36.08%), and won the November 6, 2012 General election with 3,444 votes (95.91%) against write-in candidates. As had Joule, Nageak chose to caucus with the Republican majority.
- In 2014, Nageak beat Dean Westlake of Kotzebue 1104 votes (53%) to 973 votes, in the Democratic primary and was unopposed in the general election.
- 2016 In the August 15th Democratic primary rematch, Nageak was apparently defeated 819 votes to 798, 50.65%–49.35% by Westlake.

A recount certified on September 6 had him losing, but by only four votes, and he was expected to challenge the results. A further review of votes extended Westlake's lead to 8 votes, 825 votes to 817. An Anchorage judge, Andrew Guidi, heard Nageak's protest, took 12 votes from Weslake, and two from Nageak, giving Nageak a two-vote victory, which was appealed to the state supreme court.

The Alaska Supreme Court reversed Judge Guidi's decision, handing the victory to Westlake.
