= Arlien Johnson =

American social work researcher

- Born: 1894; Oregon
- Died: 1988 (aged 93–94)
- Education: Columbia University; University of Chicago
- Scientific career
- Fields: Social work
- Workplaces: University of Washington; University of Southern California

Arlien Johnson (1894—1988) was an American social work researcher. She was the founding Director of the School of Social Work at the University of Washington from 1934 to 1939. From 1939 until 1959, she was Dean of USC Suzanne Dworak-Peck School of Social Work.

== Life and career ==
Johnson was born in Oregon in 1894. She attended Columbia University, where she earned a master's degree. She then obtained a PhD in Social Service Administration from the Crown Family School of Social Work, Policy, and Practice.

Johnson began working as a social worker in Hell's Kitchen, Manhattan in 1919. During the Great Depression, Johnson worked for the Seattle Community Fund and for the Emergency Relief Administration of Washington State.

In 1934, the University of Washington created a Graduate School of Social Work, to respond to the need for social workers and administrators of government agencies prompted by the Great Depression. Johnson was named the inaugural Director. By 1938, more than half of the welfare administrators in the county were graduates of the School of Social Work. Johnson remained Director of the School of Social Work until her successor Ernest Witte was appointed in 1939.

In 1939, Johnson moved to the University of Southern California, where she was Dean of the School of Social Work. While she was the Dean there, the University of Southern California established an independent school for social work training, and became the first school in the Western United States to provide doctoral training in social work.

In 1947, Johnson was President of the National Conference of Social Work. She served on a number of government commissions, and chaired the Fulbright Commission’s American Social Work Team in a study of social services in Great Britain.

Johnson was one of the "women of the year" of the Los Angeles Times in 1947, in recognition of her community service and leadership in local welfare causes.

Johnson died in March 1988.

== Selected works ==
- Public Policy and Private Charities: A Study of Legislation in the United States and of Administration in Illinois (1931)
- "Social Work as a Profession", Social Work Yearbook (1943)
- "Educating Professional Social Workers for Ethical Practice", Social Service Review (1955)
- "Development of basic methods of social work practice and education", Social Work Journal (1955)
- School Social Work: Its Contribution to Professional Education (1962)

== Selected awards ==
- Listed as a "woman of the year" by the Los Angeles Times (1947)
