= Dean Westlake =

American politician (1960–2022)

- Nuna

Member of the Alaska House of Representatives from the 40th District
- In office January 17, 2017 – December 25, 2017
- Preceded by: Benjamin Nageak
- Succeeded by: John Lincoln

Personal details
- Born: January 8, 1960 Noorvik, Alaska, U.S.
- Died: August 21, 2022 (aged 62) Anchorage, Alaska, U.S.
- Party: Democratic

Dean Westlake (January 8, 1960 – August 21, 2022), or Nuna in Iñupiaq, was an American politician from Alaska. He served in the Alaska House of Representatives in 2017, representing the 40th District in Alaska's North Slope region. A member of the Democratic Party, he caucused with the Democrat-led majority in the House of Representatives that includes independents and Republicans.

== Political career ==
Westlake first ran for the House in 2014, mounting an unsuccessful Democratic primary challenge to Barrow Representative Benjamin Nageak, who caucused with the Republican-led majority caucus at the time. He ran again in 2016 and defeated Nageak in a very close election that was contested in court. A lower court ruled that 50 votes cast in Shungnak, a rural community that went overwhelmingly for Westlake, had been improperly cast and should not have been counted. The Alaska Supreme Court reversed the ruling however, making Westlake the winner. Westlake was unopposed in the general election.

In December 2017, after seven female capitol staffers aired complaints of inappropriate sexual behavior by Westlake, he apologized. However, when he fathered a child with a 16-year-old in 1988 when he was 28 was about to be publicized, he tendered his resignation effective within ten days.

According to procedures in such a circumstance, elected District 40 representatives of his Democratic party submitted three names of prospective replacement candidates to the governor. House Democratic members were then to make a choice regarding confirmation of his nominee. By January 7, eight hopefuls had put their names into consideration for the post which officially became vacant on December 25, 2017. From those, district Democrats forwarded the governor the names of three candidates from whom he might choose to replace Westlake: Sandy Shroyer-Beaver and Eugene Smith, both of Kotzebue and Leanna Mack of Utqiagvik. Governor Bill Walker rejected the choice of those Democratic party leaders from District 40, after he interviewed the three. Instead Walker picked John Lincoln, an official with the Kotzebue-based NANA Regional Corporation, and he forwarded his choice to House Democrats for confirmation. House Democrats quickly officially endorsed Lincoln to take the seat, effective January 26, 2018.

== Death ==
On August 21, 2022, Westlake was "pummeled" to death, at the age of 62, at his home in Anchorage, Alaska. His son, Tallon Westlake, was arrested and charged with manslaughter in reference to the death.
