= Jerry Ellis (Oklahoma politician) =

American politician

Member of the Oklahoma Senate from the 5th district
- In office 2008–2014
- Preceded by: Jeff Rabon
- Succeeded by: Joseph Silk

Member of the Oklahoma House of Representatives from the 1st district
- In office 2002–2008
- Preceded by: Terry Matlock
- Succeeded by: Dennis Bailey

Personal details
- Born: December 11, 1946 (age 79) Hugo, Oklahoma
- Party: Democratic
- Spouse: Cynthia
- Education: Oklahoma State University
- Occupation: Newspaper Publisher

Jerry Ellis (born December 11, 1946) is an American politician who served as the Oklahoma State Senator from the 5th district, which included Atoka, Choctaw, McCurtain and Pushmataha counties, from 2008 to 2014. He earlier was a member of the Oklahoma House of Representatives from 2002 through 2008.

He received his bachelor's degree in animal science from Oklahoma State University in 1969. He served in the armed forces from 1969 to 1972. He has been employed as a laborer for Weyerhaeuser and as a cattle rancher. He is co-founder and publisher of the Southeast Times newspaper.

Ellis won election to the Oklahoma Senate for District 5 in 2008. In 2002, he received the Friend of Working Men and Women Award from the McCurtain County Democratic Party. In 2007, he received the Oklahoma Rifleman Association Legislator of the Year Award. In 2008, he received the Oklahoma American Legion Legislator of the Year Award as well as the American Association of Retired Persons 50 Over 50 Award.

He is married to the former Cynthia Cox. They have one son Tom.

Ellis was named Assistant Democratic Floor Leader in December 2011. He served on the Agriculture & Rural Development, Business & Commerce and Rules Committees. He was also the Vice Chair of the Tourism & Wildlife committee and served on the Appropriation Subcommittee on Natural Resources.
