= Bryan Newland =

American lawyer

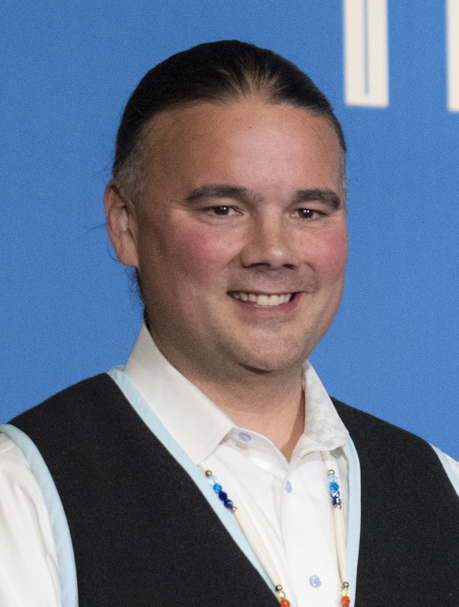
- Official portrait, 2024

Assistant Secretary of the Interior for Indian Affairs
- In office September 8, 2021 – January 20, 2025
- President: Joe Biden
- Leader: Deb Haaland
- Preceded by: Tara Sweeney
- Succeeded by: William Kirkland III

Chair of the Bay Mills Indian Community
- In office 2017–2021
- Succeeded by: Whitney Gravelle

Personal details
- Born: Chippewa County, Michigan, U.S.
- Party: Democratic
- Spouse: Erica Newland
- Children: 2
- Education: Michigan State University (BA, JD)

Bryan Todd Newland is an Ojibwe attorney and tribal leader who served as the Assistant Secretary of the Interior for Indian Affairs from 2021 to 2025.

== Early life and education ==
Newland was born and raised in the Bay Mills Indian Community, located in Chippewa County, Michigan. He earned a Bachelor of Arts degree in social relations from Michigan State University and a Juris Doctor from the Michigan State University College of Law.

== Career ==
From 2009 to 2012, Newland served as a senior advisor to the Assistant Secretary of the Interior for Indian affairs. He then joined the Fletcher Law Firm in Lansing, Michigan. He served as chief judge of the Bay Mills Indian Community from 2013 to 2017 and as tribal chair from 2017 to 2021. He was also a regent of the Bay Mills Community College from 2016 to 2021. In 2020, Newland wrote an op-ed endorsing Pete Buttigieg's 2020 presidential campaign, arguing Buttigieg "speaks to issues important to Tribal Nations and our citizens."

On March 31, 2025, Bryan Newland joined Powers Pyles Sutter & Verville P.C. ("Powers") as a Principal in the firm's Indian Tribal Governments Practice Group.

=== Interior Department Nomination ===
Newland was formally nominated by President Joe Biden to lead the Bureau of Indian Affairs on April 22, 2021. His nomination was endorsed by the National Congress of American Indians (NCAI) and members of the United States Senate Committee on Indian Affairs. Hearings on his nomination were held before the United States Senate Committee on Indian Affairs on June 9, 2021. The committee favorably reported his nomination to the Senate floor on July 14, 2021. The Senate confirmed Newland's nomination on August 7, 2021, via voice vote.

Newland was sworn into the position in September 2021.

Newland attended Michigan State University College of Law with Kathryn Fort, Professor, attorney, author, Director of Clinics at Michigan State University College of Law, and author of "American Indian Children and the Law" ( Carolina Academic Press).
