= John Lincoln (politician) =

American politician

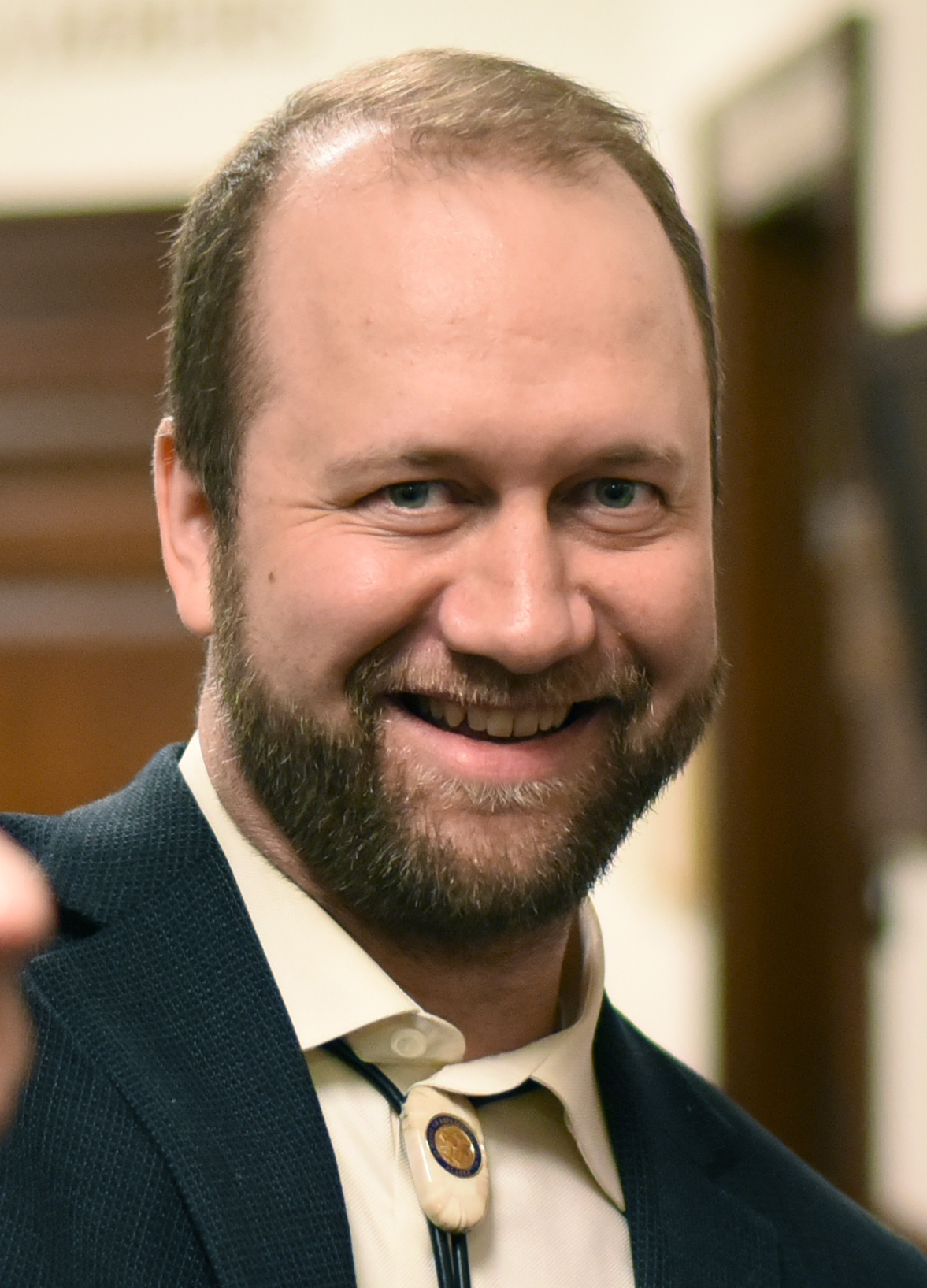
- John Lincoln in May 2019

Member of the Alaska House of Representatives from the 40th district
- In office January 24, 2018 – January 11, 2021
- Preceded by: Dean Westlake
- Succeeded by: Josiah Patkotak

Personal details
- Born: December 17, 1981 (age 44) Kotzebue, Alaska, United States
- Party: Independent (2019–present)
- Other political affiliations: Democratic (2018–2019)
- Education: Stanford University (Bachelor's degree)

John Agnaqluk Lincoln (born December 17, 1981) is an American politician who served as a member of the Alaska House of Representatives from 2018 to 2021 from the 40th district. He was appointed by the governor before winning a full term in the 2018 election.

== Early life and education ==
John Agnaqluk Lincoln was born on December 17, 1981, in Kotzebue, Alaska. He is a member of the Iñupiat group of Alaska Natives. He was a valedictorian of his Kotzebue High School class, graduating in 1999. He went on to get a bachelor's degree from Stanford University.

== Early career ==
Lincoln spent 15 years working with information technology infrastructure in Northwestern Alaska before moving to corporate governance and politics. He served as Vice President of Business Development for NANA Regional Corporation.

== Alaska House of Representatives ==
Lincoln was chosen by Governor Bill Walker to replace Dean Westlake, who resigned following sexual assault allegations. Upon his decision, Walker said:

Just like the Democratic Party officials in House District 40, I set out to identify the person who is best prepared to lead at this pivotal moment in Alaska’s history. I thank everyone who stepped forward and applied, but I am fully convinced that John Lincoln is the best person for this role.

Most of Lincoln's policies are center-left. In 2019, he became an independent and continued to caucus with the Democrats.

=== 2018 election ===
Lincoln was elected to serve a full term in the 2018 Alaska House of Representatives elections with 59.8 percent of the vote.

2018 Alaska House of Representatives election
Party	Candidate	Votes	%
Democratic	John Lincoln	2,404	59.8
Nonpartisan	Patrick Savok	878	21.8
Democratic	Leanna Mack	711	17.7
