= Rusty Farley =

American politician

Member of the Oklahoma House of Representatives from the 1st district
- In office January 2011 – July 4, 2011
- Preceded by: Dennis Bailey
- Succeeded by: Curtis McDaniel

Personal details
- Born: September 25, 1953 Redland, Oklahoma, U.S.
- Died: July 4, 2011 (aged 57) Paris, Texas, U.S.
- Party: Republican
- Children: Stephanie Farley, Alan Farley, Bethany Farley
- Occupation: Management
- Profession: Manager, wholesale plumbing supply house

Russell Elmer Farley (September 25, 1953 – July 4, 2011) was a Republican politician from Oklahoma. Farley was the Representative for District 1 in the Oklahoma House of Representatives. House District 1 encompasses all but the far northwestern corner of McCurtain County (the only county in the district), located in the southeastern corner of the state.

== Political History ==
An 18-year member of the Haworth school board, Farley was unsuccessful in his 2008 bid for the seat, losing to Dennis Bailey.

Farley ran unopposed in the 2010 primary and once again faced Bailey for the District 1 seat. Farley upset the incumbent in a District where 81 percent of the residents are registered Democrats. Even more shocking was his political financing – Farley raised a grand total of only $170 and spent only $70 on a single newspaper ad.

== Death ==
Farley died on July 4, 2011, from a pulmonary embolism at a Paris, Texas, hospital. He was 57 years old.
