= Gerald Pease =

American politician

Member of the Montana Senate from the 21st district
- In office January 3, 2001 – January 5, 2009
- Succeeded by: Sharon Stewart-Peregoy

Personal details
- Born: July 21, 1954 (age 72) Hardin, Montana
- Party: Democratic Party
- Spouse: Maria
- Occupation: rancher, highway construction

Gerald Pease is a former Democratic Party member of the Montana Senate, who represented District 21 from 2001 to 2009. Earlier he was a member of the Montana House of Representatives from 1997 through 1998.

Montana Senate
Preceded by	Member of the Montana Senate from the 31st district 2001–2009	Succeeded by Sharon Stewart-Peregoy
