= Moses Bloom =

American politician

Moses Bloom

Moses Bloom (Mar 1832 – June 14, 1893) was an American politician, member of both houses of the Iowa General Assembly, and mayor of Iowa City, Iowa, United States. Various publications name him as the first Jewish mayor of a major American city.

== Biography ==
Bloom (Moise Blum) was born in Westhoffen, Alsace, France in 1833, and left the country in 1850. He settled in Iowa City in 1857 and opened a clothing store, thus becoming the first Jewish settler and the first long-time clothier in the city. At the time, Iowa City was the capital of the recently established State of Iowa, and rapidly growing. With the major railhead soon arriving to the city, the travelers brought new business and Bloom's "One Price Clothing House" became very successful. Bloom later opened two banks in the city.

Bloom's first public office was a city alderman, for which he was elected in 1860, at the age of 27. He distinguished himself as a public speaker, and was noted for his address atop a box car to men departing for Union Army service in the Civil War. In 1873, Bloom was elected mayor of Iowa City. At the time, Iowa City had fewer than a dozen Jewish residents. He served as mayor for two years, until 1875.

In 1877, Bloom was elected to Iowa House of Representatives. There, he became influential and succeeded to secure budget support for the State University of Iowa, a "permanent annual endowment" of $20,000 a year. Bloom served two terms in the Iowa House (1877–1882), and then two terms in the Iowa Senate (1883–1888), representing Johnson County. In 1879, he pragmatically turned down the Democratic nomination for Lieutenant Governor of Iowa (from the office establishment in 1858 and until 1892, only Republicans occupied the office). He was also a Freemason.

== Legacy ==
Bloom was the first Jew in the Iowa Senate. According to some publications, Bloom was the first Jewish mayor of a major American city, narrowly beating Bailey Gatzert, who became the mayor of Seattle in 1875. This claim is a subject of dispute as smaller, predominantly Jewish communities had Jewish mayors much earlier. For example, in 1818, Solomon Cohen was elected the first Jewish mayor of a historic Georgetown, South Carolina. Similarly, David Naar was elected the mayor of Elizabeth Borough, New Jersey in 1843, and is also credited with being the first Jewish mayor in the United States.

The "Moses Bloom Clothing Store" located at 28–30 S. Clinton St. remains one of the key historical buildings in the downtown of Iowa City. The Moses Bloom Lane in the city is also named after him.

== See also ==
- List of Jewish political milestones in the United States
- List of Jewish American politicians
- List of mayors of Iowa City
