= David House (disambiguation) =

David House (1922–2012) is a British Army officer.

David House may also refer to:

- David House (computer designer), an American engineer and computer designer
- Leopold David House, Anchorage, Alaska, listed on the National Register of Historic Places in Anchorage, Alaska
- William David House, Shawhan, Kentucky, listed on the NRHP in Bourbon County, Kentucky

== See also ==
- House of David (disambiguation)
