= Seal Team Six: The Raid on Osama Bin Laden =

2012 television film directed by John Stockwell

- Genre: Action, Crime, Drama, Thriller, War
- Written by: Kendall Lampkin
- Directed by: John Stockwell
- Theme music composer: Paul Haslinger
- Country of origin: United States
- Original language: English

Production
- Executive producers: Phillip B. Goldfine; Kevin Hoiseth; Meghan O'Hara; Corrie Rothbart; Dominic Rustam; Vivek Singhania; Adam M. Stone; Cat Stone; Axel Uriegas; John N. Ward; Bob Weinstein; Harvey Weinstein
- Producers: Nicolas Chartier; Zev Foreman; Tony Mark
- Cinematography: Peter Holland
- Editor: Ben Callahan
- Running time: 90 minutes
- Production companies: Voltage Pictures; The Weinstein Company

Original release
- Network: National Geographic
- Release: November 4, 2012

SEAL Team Six: The Raid on Osama Bin Laden is a 2012 American war action television film directed by John Stockwell chronicling the Abbottabad compound raid and killing of Osama bin Laden in 2011 by U.S. Navy SEALs. It first aired on the National Geographic Channel on Sunday, November 4, 2012. The facts in the film were not confirmed or denied by White House officials. Kathleen Robertson and Cam Gigandet have roles. It holds a mixed critic rating on score aggregator Metacritic.

== Cast ==
SEAL Team Six

- Tait Fletcher as "D Punch"
- Cam Gigandet as "Stunner"
- Robert Knepper as Lieutenant Commander
- Kenneth Miller as "Sauce"
- Anson Mount as "Cherry"
- Freddy Rodriguez as "Trench"
- Xzibit as "Mule"

CIA

- William Fichtner as Mr. Guidry
- Kristen Rakes as CIA Analyst
- Kathleen Robertson as Vivian
- Rajesh Shringarpure as Waseem
- Eddie Kaye Thomas as Christian

Additional cast

- Lora Cunningham as TOC Tech Torres
- Jenny Gabrielle as Tricia
- Mo Gallini as The Interrogator
- David House as TOC Tech
- Yon Kempton as Osama bin Laden
- Jahan Khalili as Khalid
- Keith Meriweather as TOC Commander
- Sarah Minnich as The Waitress
- Alma Sisneros as Trench's Girlfriend
- Saleem Watley as Al-Kuwaiti
- Harsh Chhaya as Dr. Afridi
- Maninder Singh as Malik
- Joe Cabezuela Navy SEAL Member (uncredited)

== Release ==
The film was released in the UK in December 2012 under the title Code Name: Geronimo.

== See also ==
- List of films featuring the United States Navy SEALs
- No Easy Day: The Firsthand Account of the Mission that Killed Osama bin Laden
- Zero Dark Thirty
