= Joseph Conroy =

Joseph Conroy may refer to:

- Joseph Henry Conroy (1858-1939), American prelate of the Roman Catholic Church
- M. Joseph Conroy (Michael Joseph Conroy, 1874-1946), Second Mayor of Anchorage, Alaska

== See also ==
- Joe Conroy (born 1934), Michigan State Senator
- Robert Conroy (Joseph Robert Conroy 1938-2014), American author of alternate history novels
