= List of Jewish American politicians =

This is a list of notable Jewish American politicians, arranged chronologically. For other Jewish Americans, see Lists of Jewish Americans.

== Federal government ==
=== Other ===
- Doug Emhoff, former Second Gentleman of the United States

== State government ==
=== Governors ===
State	Name	Party	Start	End	Notes
Georgia	David Emanuel	Democratic-Republican	March 3, 1801	November 7, 1801	Emanuel may not have been an openly practicing Jew. As an adult he became a Presbyterian, but modern historians accept he was Jewish.
Wisconsin	Edward Salomon	Republican	April 19, 1862	January 4, 1864	
Washington	Edward Salomon	Republican	March 4, 1870	May 26, 1872	
California	Washington Bartlett	Democratic	January 8, 1887	September 12, 1887	California's first and only Jewish governor
Idaho	Moses Alexander	Democratic	January 4, 1915	January 6, 1919	Idaho's first and only Jewish governor
Utah	Simon Bamberger	Democratic	January 1, 1917	January 1, 1921	Utah's first and only Jewish governor
New Mexico	Arthur Seligman	Democratic	January 1, 1931	September 25, 1933	New Mexico's first Jewish governor
Oregon	Julius Meier	Independent	January 12, 1931	January 14, 1935	Oregon's first Jewish governor
New York	Herbert Lehman	Democratic	January 1, 1933	December 3, 1942	New York's first Jewish governor
Florida	David Sholtz	Democratic	January 3, 1933	January 5, 1937	Florida's first Jewish governor
Illinois	Henry Horner	Democratic	January 9, 1933	October 6, 1940	Illinois' first Jewish governor
Wisconsin	Julius Heil	Republican	January 2, 1939	January 4, 1943	
Alaska	Ernest Gruening	Democratic	December 6, 1939	April 10, 1953	Alaska's first and only Jewish governor
Connecticut	Abe Ribicoff	Democratic	January 5, 1955	January 21, 1961	Connecticut's first and only Jewish governor
Illinois	Samuel Shapiro	Democratic	May 21, 1968	January 13, 1969	
Rhode Island	Frank Licht	Democratic	January 7, 1969	January 2, 1973	Rhode Island's first Jewish governor
Maryland	Marvin Mandel	Democratic	January 7, 1969	January 17, 1979	Maryland's first and only Jewish governor *Blair Lee III served as Acting Governor from June 4, 1977, to January 15, 1979
Pennsylvania	Milton Shapp	Democratic	January 19, 1971	January 16, 1979	Pennsylvania's first Jewish governor
Vermont	Madeleine Kunin	Democratic	January 10, 1985	January 10, 1991	Vermont's first Jewish governor
Oregon	Neil Goldschmidt	Democratic	January 12, 1987	January 14, 1991	
Rhode Island	Bruce Sundlun	Democratic	January 1, 1991	January 3, 1995	
Hawaii	Linda Lingle	Republican	December 2, 2002	December 6, 2010	Hawaii's first Jewish governor
Pennsylvania	Ed Rendell	Democratic	January 21, 2003	January 18, 2011	
New York	Eliot Spitzer	Democratic	January 1, 2007	March 17, 2008	
Delaware	Jack Markell	Democratic	January 20, 2009	January 17, 2017	Delaware's first Jewish governor
Vermont	Peter Shumlin	Democratic	January 6, 2011	January 5, 2017	
Missouri	Eric Greitens	Republican	January 9, 2017	June 1, 2018	Missouri's first Jewish governor
Colorado	Jared Polis	Democratic	January 8, 2019	January 11, 2027	Colorado's first Jewish governor
Illinois	J. B. Pritzker	Democratic	January 14, 2019	Incumbent	
Hawaii	Josh Green	Democratic	December 5, 2022	Incumbent	
Pennsylvania	Josh Shapiro	Democratic	January 17, 2023	Incumbent	
North Carolina	Josh Stein	Democratic	January 1, 2025	Incumbent	North Carolina's first Jewish Governor
Delaware	Matt Meyer	Democratic	January 21, 2025	Incumbent	
Ohio	Amy Acton	Democratic	January 11, 2027	Elect	
Colorado	Phil Weiser	Democratic	January 11, 2027	Elect	

=== Lieutenant governors ===
State	Portrait	Name	Party	Assumed office	Left office
Louisiana		Henry Hyams	Democratic	January 23, 1860	January 25, 1864
New York		Herbert Lehman	Democratic	January 1, 1929	December 31, 1932
Illinois		Samuel Shapiro	Democratic	January 9, 1961	May 21, 1968
Vermont		Madeleine Kunin	Democratic	January 10, 1979	January 10, 1983
Missouri		Ken Rothman	Democratic	January 12, 1981	January 15, 1985
Rhode Island		Richard Licht	Democratic	January 1, 1985	January 1, 1989
Missouri		Harriett Woods	Democratic	January 14, 1985	January 9, 1989
Maryland		Melvin Steinberg	Democratic	January 21, 1987	January 18, 1995
Pennsylvania		Robert Jubelirer	Republican	October 5, 2001	January 21, 2003
Ohio		Lee Fisher	Democratic	January 8, 2007	January 10, 2011
Delaware		Matthew Denn	Democratic	January 20, 2009	January 6, 2015
New York		Richard Ravitch	Democratic	July 9, 2009	December 31, 2010
Louisiana		Jay Dardenne	Republican	November 22, 2010	January 11, 2016
Hawaii		Brian Schatz	Democratic	December 6, 2010	December 26, 2012
Connecticut		Nancy Wyman	Democratic	January 5, 2011	January 9, 2019
Kentucky		Jerry Abramson	Democratic	December 13, 2011	November 13, 2014
Florida		Carlos Lopez-Cantera	Republican	February 3, 2014	January 7, 2019
Vermont		David Zuckerman	Vermont Progressive Party	January 5, 2017	January 7, 2021
Hawaii		Josh Green	Democratic	December 3, 2018	December 5, 2022
Vermont		David Zuckerman	Vermont Progressive Party	January 5, 2023	January 9, 2025

=== State Attorneys General ===
State	Portrait	Name	Party	Assumed office	Left office
New York		Simon Rosendale	Democratic	January 1, 1892	December 31, 1893
Maryland		Isidor Rayner	Democratic	1899	1903
Maryland		Isaac Straus	Democratic	1907	1911
New York		Carl Sherman	Democratic	January 1, 1923	December 31, 1924
New York		Albert Ottinger	Republican	January 1, 1925	December 31, 1928
Ohio		Gilbert Bettman	Republican	January 14, 1929	January 12, 1933
New Jersey		David Wilentz	Democratic	1934	1944
New York		Nathaniel Goldstein	Republican	January 1, 1943	December 31, 1954
Delaware		Albert Young	Independent	1951	1955
Massachusetts		George Fingold	Republican	January 8, 1953	August 31, 1958
New York		Jacob Javits	Republican	January 1, 1955	January 9, 1957
New York		Louis Lefkowitz	Republican	January 10, 1957	December 31, 1978
California		Stanley Mosk	Democratic	January 5, 1959	1964
New Hampshire		Warren Rudman	Republican	1970	1976
Rhode Island		Richard Israel	Republican	January 5, 1971	January 7, 1975
Florida		Robert Shevin	Democratic	January 5, 1971	January 2, 1979
Vermont		Jerome Diamond	Democratic	1975	1981
Rhode Island		Julius Michaelson	Democratic	January 7, 1975	January 2, 1979
New York		Robert Abrams	Democratic	January 1, 1979	January 31, 1993
Maryland		Stephen Sachs	Democratic	January 17, 1979	January 21, 1987
Connecticut		Joe Lieberman	Democratic	January 5, 1983	January 3, 1989
Connecticut		Richard Blumenthal	Democratic	January 9, 1991	January 5, 2011
Ohio		Lee Fisher	Democratic	January 14, 1991	January 9, 1995
New York		G. Oliver Koppell	Democratic	January 1, 1993	December 31, 1994
Rhode Island		Jeffrey Pine	Republican	January 5, 1993	January 2, 1999
New Jersey		Deborah Poritz	Republican	1994	1996
New York		Eliot Spitzer	Democratic	January 1, 1999	December 31, 2006
New Jersey		David Samson	Independent	January 15, 2002	February 15, 2003
New Jersey		Stuart Rabner	Democratic	September 26, 2006	June 26, 2007
Maryland		Doug Gansler	Democratic	January 17, 2007	January 21, 2015
Louisiana		Buddy Caldwell	Democratic	January 14, 2008	February 2, 2011
Louisiana		Buddy Caldwell	Republican	February 2, 2011	January 11, 2016
New York		Eric Schneiderman	Democratic	January 1, 2011	May 8, 2018
Arizona		Tom Horne	Republican	January 3, 2011	January 5, 2015
Georgia		Sam Olens	Republican	January 10, 2011	November 1, 2016
Oregon		Ellen Rosenblum	Democratic	June 29, 2012	December 31, 2024
Delaware		Matthew Denn	Democratic	January 6, 2015	January 1, 2019
Maryland		Brian Frosh	Democratic	January 21, 2015	January 3, 2023
North Carolina		Josh Stein	Democratic	January 1, 2017	January 1, 2025
Pennsylvania		Josh Shapiro	Democratic	January 17, 2017	January 17, 2023
Michigan		Dana Nessel	Democratic	January 1, 2019	Incumbent
Colorado		Phil Weiser	Democratic	January 8, 2019	Incumbent
Washington D.C.		Brian Schwalb	Democratic	January 2, 2023	Incumbent

=== State Secretaries of State ===
State	Portrait	Name	Party	Assumed office	Left office
New York		Samuel Koenig	Republican	January 1, 1909	December 31, 1910
New York		Mitchell May	Democratic	January 1, 1913	December 31, 1914
New York		Caroline Simon	Republican	1959	1963
Connecticut		Mildred Allen	Republican	January 3, 1955	January 3, 1959
Florida		Richard Stone	Democratic	January 5, 1971	July 8, 1974
Florida		George Firestone	Democratic	1979	1989
Vermont		Deborah Markowitz	Democratic	January 1999	January 2011
Louisiana		Jay Dardenne	Republican	November 10, 2006	November 22, 2010
Missouri		Jason Kander	Democratic	January 14, 2013	January 9, 2017
Colorado		Jena Griswold	Democratic	January 8, 2019	Incumbent

=== State Treasurers ===
State	Portrait	Name	Party	Assumed office	Left office
New Jersey		David Naar	Democratic	1865	1865
New Jersey		Katharine White; Acting	Democratic	1961	1961
Maine		Samuel Shapiro	Democratic	1981	1996
Rhode Island		Nancy Mayer	Republican	1993	1997
Delaware		Jack Markell	Democratic	January 16, 1999	January 20, 2009
Kentucky		Jonathan Miller	Democratic	December 1999	December 11, 2007
Massachusetts		Steve Grossman	Democratic	January 17, 2011	January 21, 2015
Ohio		Josh Mandel	Republican	January 10, 2011	January 14, 2019
Nevada		Dan Schwartz	Republican	January 5, 2015	January 7, 2019
Rhode Island		Seth Magaziner	Democratic	January 6, 2015	January 3, 2023
Massachusetts		Deb Goldberg	Democratic	January 21, 2015	Incumbent

=== Other State Cabinet Positions ===
State	Position	Portrait	Name	Party	Assumed office	Left office
Florida	Agriculture Commissioner		Nikki Fried	Democratic	January 8, 2019	January 3, 2023

=== State legislators ===
- Daniel Ankeles, Member of the Maine House of Representatives
- Simcha Felder, Member of the New York State Senate
- Lazarus Joseph (1891–1966), Member of the New York State Senate and New York City Comptroller
- Micah Lasher (born 1981), Member of the New York State Assembly
- Florence Shapiro (born 1948), Member of the Texas State Senate (1993–2013)
- Loretta Weinberg (born 1935), former Majority Leader of the New Jersey Senate
- Saul Weprin (1927–1994), Speaker of the New York State Assembly
- Reuven Carlyle (born 1965), Member of the Washington state House of Representatives and Senate (2009-2023)

== Municipal government ==
=== Mayors of major cities ===
==== Current mayors of major cities ====
City	State	Portrait	Name	Party	Assumed office	Left office
San Francisco	California		Daniel Lurie	Democratic	January 8, 2025	Incumbent
Minneapolis	Minnesota		Jacob Frey	Democratic	January 2, 2018	Incumbent

==== Former mayors of major cities ====
- Jerry Abramson (D-Louisville, KY: 1986–1999; 2003–2011)
- Steve Adler (D-Austin, TX: 2015-2023)
- Moses Alexander (D-Boise, ID: 1897–1899; 1901–1903)
- Abe Aronovitz (R-Miami, FL: 1953–1955)
- Harry Bacharach (R-Atlantic City, NJ: 1912; 1916–1920; 1930–1935)
- Walt Bachrach (R-Cincinnati, OH: 1960–1967
- Abraham Beame (D-New York, NY: 1974–1977)
- Martin Behrman (D-New Orleans, LA: 1904–1920; 1925–1926)
- Andy Berke (D-Chattanooga, TN: 2013-2021)
- Richard Berkley (R-Kansas City, MO: 1979–1991)
- Ethan Berkowitz (D-Anchorage, AK: 2015–2020)
- Bruce Blakeman (R-First Presiding Officer of Nassau County, NY)
- Michael Bloomberg (D-New York, NY: 2002–2013)
- David Cicilline (D-Providence, RI: 2003–2011)
- Josh Cohen (D-Annapolis, MD: 2009–2013)
- Larry Cohen (D-Saint Paul, MN: 1972–1976)
- Norm Coleman (R-Saint Paul, MN: 1997–2002)
- Leopold David (Anchorage, AK: 1920–1923), first mayor of Anchorage
- Rahm Emanuel (D-Chicago, IL: 2011–2019)
- Mutt Evans (D-Durham, NC: 1951–1963)
- Dianne Feinstein (D-San Francisco, CA: 1978–1988)
- Bob Filner (D-San Diego, CA: 2012–2013)
- Samuel Folz (D-Kalamazoo, MI: 1903)
- Lois Frankel (D-West Palm Beach, FL: 2003–2011)
- Sandra Freedman (D-Tampa, FL: 1986–1995)
- Jeffrey Friedman (D-Austin, TX: 1975–1977)
- Steven Fulop (D-Jersey City, NJ: 2013-2026)
- Eva Galambos (R-Sandy Springs, GA: 2005–2014)
- Eric Garcetti (D-Los Angeles, CA; 2013–2022)
- Bailey Gatzert (I-Seattle, WA: 1875–1876)
- Susan Golding (R-San Diego, CA: 1992–2000)
- Neil Goldschmidt (D-Portland, OR: 1973–1979)
- Stephen Goldsmith (R-Indianapolis, IN: 1992–2000)
- Carolyn Goodman (I-Las Vegas, NV: 2011-2024)
- Phil Gordon (D-Phoenix, AZ: 2004–2012)
- Bill Gradison (R-Cincinnati, OH: 1971)
- Robert Harris (D-Ann Arbor, MI: 1969–1973)
- Adlene Harrison (D-Dallas, TX: 1976)
- Max Heller (D-Greenville, SC: 1971–1979)
- Julius Houseman (D-Grand Rapids, MI: 1872–1873; 1874–1875)
- Vera Katz (D-Portland, OR: 1993–2005)
- Ed Koch (D-New York, NY: 1978–1989)
- Rick Kriseman (D-St. Petersburg, FL: 2014-2022)
- Joseph Lazarow (R-Atlantic City, NJ: 1976–1982)
- Oscar Leeser (D-El Paso, TX: 2013–2017, 2021–Present)
- Henry Loeb (D-Memphis, TN: 1960–1963; 1968–1971),
- Zachariah J. Loussac (D-Anchorage, AK: 1948–1951)
- Sophie Masloff (D-Pittsburgh, PA: 1988–1994)
- Sam Massell (D-Atlanta, GA: 1970–1974)
- Laura Miller (D-Dallas, TX: 2002–2007)
- Arthur Naftalin (D-Minneapolis, MN: 1961–1969)
- Ron Nirenberg (D-San Antonio, TX: 2017-2025)
- Meyera Oberndorf (D-Virginia Beach, VA: 1988–2009)
- Ed Rendell (D-Philadelphia, PA: 1992 – 2000)
- Jonathan Rothschild (D-Tucson, AZ: 2011–2019)
- Libby Schaaf (D-Oakland, CA: 2015–2023)
- Steve Schewel (D-Durham, NC: 2017–2021)
- Kel Seliger (R-Amarillo, TX: 1993–2001)
- Florence Shapiro (R-Plano, TX: 1990–1992)
- Joseph Simon (R-Portland, OR: 1909–1911)
- Paul Soglin (D-Madison, WI: 1973–1979; 1989–1997; 2011–2019)
- Jerry Springer (D-Cincinnati, OH: 1977–1978)
- Darrell Steinberg (D-Sacramento, CA: 2016-2024)
- Annette Strauss (D-Dallas, TX: 1987–1991)
- Adolph Sutro (R-San Francisco, CA: 1895–1897)
- Miro Weinberger (D-Burlington, VT: 2012-2024)
- Susan Weiner (R-Savannah, GA: 1992–1996)
- Edward Zorinsky (R-Omaha, NE: 1973–1976)

==== Other ====
- Chelsea Cook, Member of the Durham City Council

== Presidential and vice presidential candidates ==
- Tonie Nathan was the vice presidential nominee of the Libertarian Party in 1972. She received one electoral vote for vice president (from a faithless elector that had pledged his vote for Republicans Richard Nixon and Spiro Agnew), thus becoming the first Jew to receive an electoral vote for either president or vice president.
- Arlen Specter ran for the Republican nomination in 1996, but dropped out before the Iowa caucuses. He later became a Democrat.
- Joe Lieberman was the Democratic nominee for vice president in 2000, receiving 266 electoral votes for vice president. Four years later, he ran for the Democratic presidential nomination for the 2004 election. He became an independent in 2006.
- Jill Stein was the Green Party nominee in 2012. She lost with 0.36% of the vote, or 470,000 votes. She ran in the 2016 Presidential Election, but lost with just over one percent. Stein ran for a third time in 2024 as the Green Party nominee.
- Bernie Sanders ran for president in 2016 as a Democrat. He became the first Jewish candidate to win a Democratic party primary with a victory in New Hampshire. He lost the nomination to Hillary Clinton. He ran again in 2020. Sanders received one vote in the electoral college in 2016 from David Mulinix of Hawaii, thus making him the first Jew to receive a vote for president in the college. In addition to this, he received two invalidated votes from other voters in the electoral college.
- Michael Bennet ran in the 2020 Democratic Party presidential primaries.
- Michael Bloomberg ran as a candidate in the 2020 Democratic Party presidential primaries.
- Marianne Williamson, raised in a Jewish family, ran in the 2020 Democratic Party presidential primaries. Williamson ran again four years later in the 2024 Democratic Party presidential primaries.
- Dean Phillips ran as a candidate in the 2024 Democratic Party presidential primaries.

== See also ==
- Jewish Democratic Council of America
- List of Jewish political milestones in the United States
- List of Jewish American jurists
- Republican Jewish Coalition
