= Will Clayson =

American politician (1868–1950)

5th Mayor of Anchorage, Alaska
- In office May 9, 1927 – April 9, 1928
- Preceded by: Chris M. Eckmann
- Succeeded by: Grant Reed

Personal details
- Born: June 24, 1868 Port Gamble, Washington
- Died: September 28, 1950 Portland, Oregon

Will Clayson (June 24, 1868 – September 28, 1950) was an American politician who served as the fifth mayor of Anchorage, Alaska, from 1927 to 1928.

== Biography ==
William H. Clayson was born in Port Gamble, Washington Territory, to English immigrant parents, Edward Clayson and Annie Mary Quinton. By 1869, the family had settled in a logging camp near Seabeck, Washington Territory, where a sister, Esther, and a brother, Frederick, were born. The family moved to Portland in 1883, where another sister, Charlotte, was born. Will attended Pacific University in Forest Grove, Oregon.

=== Alaska ===
In July 1897, just weeks after hearing the news that gold had been discovered in the Klondike, Will's brother Frederick sailed for Skagway, Alaska. He was accompanied by their brother-in-law, Emil Pohl, who had married Esther three years prior. Will followed in September, and helped Frederick to open an outfitting store, F.W. Clayson and Company. Their mother, who had divorced their father some years hence, joined them. Esther followed the next year, having completing post-graduate studies in Chicago.

When Frederick was murdered on the Dawson Trail on Christmas Day, 1899, Will was appointed executor of his estate. He continued to managed the Skagway store.

Will's first marriage, to a woman named Cecilia, produced a son, William, Jr. In 1905, he opened Clayson the Clothier, a clothing store, in Seward, Alaska. In 1909, he moved to Cordova to start another store. Eventually, he was remarried to the Canadian-born Mabel Tuck, and by 1923, he operated a store in Anchorage, Alaska.

=== Political career and later years ===
In 1925, Clayson was elected to the Anchorage City Council, and two years later, on April 5, 1927, he was elected to succeed Chris M. Eckmann as Mayor of Anchorage, defeating W.B. Dean 319 to 278. As mayor, Clayson promoted improvements to infrastructure, including water and sewer lines, streets and sidewalks, and the city's docks. It was during Clayson's tenure that the city council approved an ordinance authorizing the construction of the Eklutna Dam by Frank Ivan Reed's Anchorage Light and Power Company. Clayson did not run for a second term.

Clayson became an early investor in Anchorage Air Transport, Inc, which was founded in 1926 to capitalize on growing demand for commercial aviation. It operated flights from the field later known as the Delaney Park Strip.

Clayson moved to Portland in 1929, returning each year to mind his business interests in Alaska. He died in 1950, at the age of 82.

Preceded by Chris M. Eckmann	Mayor of Anchorage; 1927 – 1928	Succeeded by Grant Reed
