= Hinchey =

Hinchey is a surname. Notable people with the surname include:

- Edward H. Hinchey (1872–1936), Canadian mayor
- Ken Hinchey (1912–1994), American businessman and politician
- Margaret Hinchey (1870–1944), American suffragist and labor leader
- Maurice Hinchey (1938–2017), American politician
- Michael Hinchey (born 1969), Irish computer scientist
- Michelle Hinchey (born 1987), American politician
