= Charles W. Bush =

American politician (1881–1955)

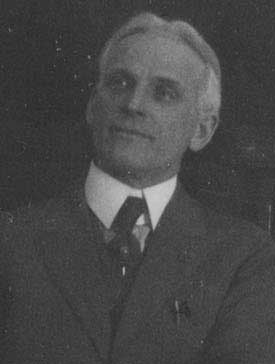

3rd Mayor of Anchorage, Alaska
- In office October 8, 1924 – January 1, 1926
- Preceded by: M. Joseph Conroy
- Succeeded by: Chris M. Eckmann

Personal details
- Born: October 17, 1881 German Empire
- Died: August 4, 1955 San Diego, California

Charles W. Bush (October 17, 1881 – August 4, 1955) was an American politician who served as the third mayor of Anchorage, Alaska, from 1924 to 1926.

== Biography ==
Charles William Bush was born in Germany and immigrated with his family to the United States while he was still an infant. He came of age in Portland, Oregon, where he worked as a clothing salesman. In 1905, he moved to Valdez, Alaska, where he operated a tobacco store with his sister, Emma. In 1915, he moved to the not-yet-incorporated city of Anchorage. It was about this time that a boy, Edward, was born to Charles and his wife, Dora.

While in Anchorage, Bush worked for many years as a manager of the Brown & Hawkins general mercantile store, and in 1923, he was elected to the Anchorage City Council. After Anchorage mayor M. Joseph Conroy resigned on October 2, 1924, Bush was appointed by the City Council to complete Conroy's term. He was re-elected as mayor in 1925, but resigned from the office of mayor on December 16, 1925. Meanwhile, Brown & Hawkins decided to close its Anchorage store, and Bush return to Portland. Bush moved to San Diego, California sometime between 1926 and 1930, where he worked as a salesman for the Marston Company, a local department store.

Bush died on August 4, 1955.

| Preceded by M. Joseph Conroy | Mayor of Anchorage; 1924 – 1926 | Succeeded by Chris M. Eckmann |
