= Chris M. Eckmann =

American politician (1874–1937)

4th Mayor of Anchorage, Alaska
- In office January 1, 1926 – May 9, 1927
- Preceded by: Charles W. Bush
- Succeeded by: Will Clayson

Personal details
- Born: May 27, 1874 Vejle County, Denmark
- Died: January 21, 1937 Seattle, Washington

Chris M. Eckmann (May 27, 1874 – January 21, 1937) was an American politician who served as the fourth mayor of Anchorage, Alaska, from 1926 to 1927.

== Biography ==
Chris Eckmann was born May 27, 1874, in Denmark. He worked in lumber in North Dakota before moving to Seattle to enter the furniture trade in 1906. He married in 1911, and in May 1915, moved to tent city at the site of what would later become known as Anchorage. He opened up a furniture store on the corner of Fifth Avenue and K Street, and worked for the Alaska Railroad as a clerk and a baggage handler.

In 1923 he was elected to the Anchorage City Council, and in 1926 he was elected to a single term as mayor. He was elected to an additional term on the council in 1933. He served as a director of First National Bank Alaska, and was active in a number of fraternal organizations, including the Freemasons, the Shriners, the Elks, the Eagles, and the Odd Fellows.

He died from complications of pneumonia the night of January 21, 1937 at Anchorage Hospital.

Preceded by Charles W. Bush	Mayor of Anchorage; 1926 – 1927	Succeeded by Will Clayson
