= Stanley McCutcheon =

American politician and attorney (1917–1975)

18th Speaker of the Alaska Territorial House of Representatives
- In office January 24, 1949 – January 22, 1951
- Preceded by: Oscar S. Gill
- Succeeded by: William A. Egan

Member of the Alaska Territorial House of Representatives from the 3rd district
- In office January 24, 1955 – January 28, 1957
- In office January 24, 1949 – January 26, 1953
- In office January 25, 1943 – January 27, 1947

Personal details
- Born: Stanley J. McCutcheon; September 1917 Anchorage, Territory of Alaska, U.S.
- Died: May 22, 1975 (aged 57) Anchorage, Alaska, U.S.
- Party: Democratic
- Spouse: Evelyn
- Children: 2
- Parent: H. H. McCutcheon (father)
- Occupation: Politician, attorney

Stanley J. McCutcheon (September 1917 – May 22, 1975) was an American politician and attorney from Anchorage, Alaska, who served five terms in the Alaska Territorial House of Representatives, representing the 3rd electoral district as a Democrat in the 16th, 17th, 19th, 20th, and 22nd territorial legislatures. He served as the 18th speaker of the Alaska Territorial House of Representatives from 1949 to 1951 in the 19th territorial legislature.

== Early life and education ==
McCutcheon was born in Anchorage in the Territory of Alaska in September 1917 as the second of three sons of Herbert Hazard "H. H." McCutcheon (July 31, 1876 – November 13, 1945) and Clara Johanna (née Krueger) McCutcheon (March 12, 1890 – December 29, 1986). His father served in the Alaska Territorial House of Representatives from 1931 to 1943 and in the Alaska Territorial Senate from 1943 to 1945, serving as the 14th speaker of the Alaska Territorial House of Representatives from 1941 to 1943.

Stanley McCutcheon attended high school and law school in Anchorage.

== Career ==
McCutcheon served five terms in the Alaska Territorial House of Representatives, representing the 3rd electoral district as a member of the Democratic Party. He served from 1943 to 1947 in the 16th and 17th territorial legislatures, from 1949 to 1953 in the 19th and 20th territorial legislatures, and from 1955 to 1957 in the 22nd territorial legislature. McCutcheon served one term as the 18th speaker of the Alaska Territorial House from 1949 to 1951 in the 19th territorial legislature.

McCutcheon was a delegate to the Democratic National Convention from Alaska Territory in 1952 and 1956. Additionally, he was a delegate to the Democratic National Convention from the U.S. state of Alaska in 1960 and 1968.

In 1954, McCutcheon authored a petition asking U.S. President Dwight D. Eisenhower to recall Alaska Governor B. Frank Heintzleman, describing it as a nonpartisan movement.

Outside of the Alaska Territorial Legislature, McCutcheon was an attorney with a private law practice in Anchorage. He also served as president of Alaska Airlines.

McCutcheon helped Alaska natives obtain a $962 million settlement and 40 million acres of land.

== Legal issues ==
On November 20, 1952, following the closure of the Union Bank of Anchorage by the Territorial Banking Board, McCutcheon was arrested along with the institution's president, Ndrew Hassman, on seven misdemeanor charges of failing to abide by banking laws, which included making loans in excess of legal limits, failure to hold meetings of stockholders, and failure to obey bank board orders. They both posted bond of $3,000 and were released immediately. McCutcheon and Hassman denied any wrongdoing and alleged that the charges were politically motivated.

== Personal life and death ==
McCutcheon had a wife and two children. He was a member of The Elks.

McCutcheon died at the age of 57 in Anchorage on May 22, 1975.

Alaska House of Representatives
Preceded by —	Member of the Alaska Territorial House of Representatives from the 3rd district 1943–1947, 1949–1953, 1955–1957	Succeeded by —
Preceded by Oscar S. Gill	Speaker of the Alaska Territorial House of Representatives; 1949–1951	Succeeded by William A. Egan
