= List of mayors of Anchorage, Alaska =

Mayor of Anchorage
- Seal of Anchorage, Alaska

- Flag of Anchorage, Alaska

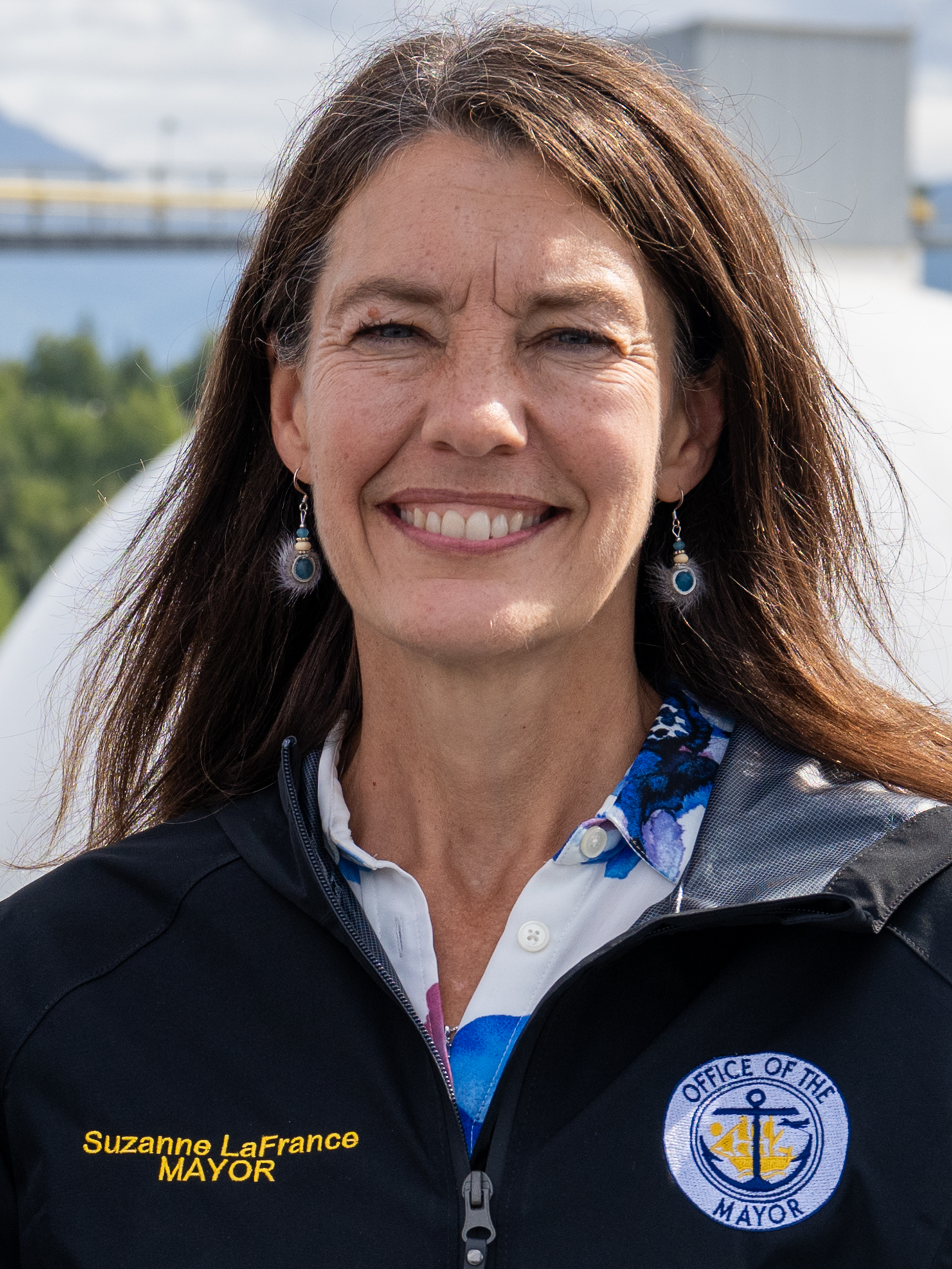
- Incumbent; Suzanne LaFrance since July 1, 2024
- Term length: 3 years
- Formation: November 26, 1920
- First holder: Leopold David

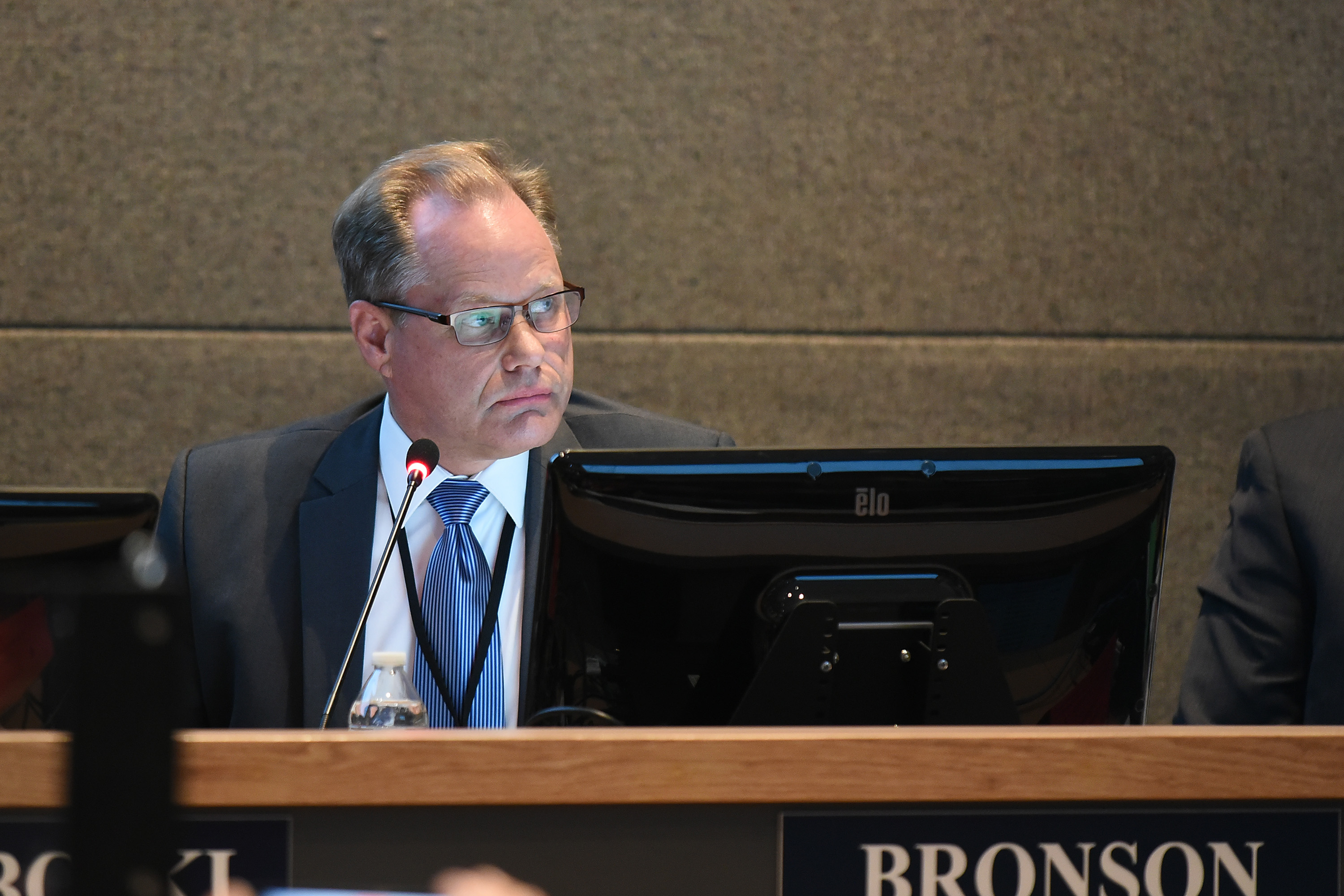
Former mayor David Bronson

This is a list of mayors of Anchorage, Alaska, United States. Anchorage was incorporated as a city on November 23, 1920. The Greater Anchorage Area Borough, which encompassed the city, was created in January 1964. The two were merged in a unified government called the Municipality of Anchorage on September 15, 1975. Under the current mayoral system, the mayor of the Municipality of Anchorage is elected in a non-partisan election to a three-year term and they are limited to two terms in office.

== List of mayors ==
=== City of Anchorage ===
No.	Image	Name	Term start	Term end
1		Leopold David	November 26, 1920	April 11, 1923
2		M. Joseph Conroy	April 11, 1923	October 8, 1924
3		Charles Bush	October 8, 1924	January 1, 1926
4		Chris M. Eckmann	January 1, 1926	May 9, 1927
5		Will Clayson	May 9, 1927	April 9, 1928
6		Grant Reed	April 9, 1928	April 10, 1929
7		James Delaney	April 10, 1929	April 11, 1932
8		Oscar S. Gill	April 11, 1932	April 7, 1933
9		Thomas J. McCroskey	April 7, 1933	January 1, 1934
10		Oscar S. Gill	January 1, 1934	April 11, 1936
11		Herbert E. Brown	April 11, 1936	April 12, 1937
12		Joseph H. Romig	April 12, 1937	April 11, 1938
13		Herbert E. Brown	April 11, 1938	April 8, 1940
14		George Vaara	April 8, 1940	April 9, 1941
15		William Alex Stolt	April 9, 1941	April 10, 1944
16		Ray Wolfe	April 10, 1944	April 9, 1945
17		John E. Manders	April 9, 1945	March 18, 1946
-		Winfield Ervin Jr. (Acting)	March 19, 1946	April 8, 1946
18		Francis C. Bowden	April 8, 1946	April 12, 1948
19		Z. J. Loussac	April 12, 1948	October 8, 1951
20		Maynard L. Taylor Jr.	October 8, 1951	October 12, 1955
21		Ken Hinchey	October 12, 1955	May 1, 1956
22		Anton Anderson	May 1, 1956	October 21, 1958
-		Hewitt Lounsbury (Acting)	October 21, 1958	October 7, 1959
23		George Byer	October 7, 1959	October 9, 1961
24		George Sharrock	October 9, 1961	October 12, 1964
25		Elmer E. Rasmuson	October 12, 1964	October 9, 1967
26		George M. Sullivan	October 9, 1967	September 16, 1975

=== Greater Anchorage Area Borough ===
Image	Name	Term start	Term end
	John Asplund (1913–1994)	January 1964	October 3, 1972
	Jack Roderick (1926–2020)	October 3, 1972	September 16, 1975

=== Municipality of Anchorage ===
No.	Image	Name	Term start	Term end	Party affiliation
1		George M. Sullivan	September 16, 1975	December 31, 1981	Republican
2		Tony Knowles	January 1, 1982	December 31, 1987	Democratic
3		Tom Fink	January 1, 1988	June 30, 1994	Republican
4		Rick Mystrom	July 1, 1994	June 30, 2000	Republican
5		George Wuerch	July 1, 2000	June 30, 2003	Republican
6		Mark Begich	July 1, 2003	January 3, 2009	Democratic
-		Matt Claman (Acting)	January 3, 2009	July 1, 2009	Democratic
7		Daniel A. Sullivan	July 2, 2009	June 30, 2015	Republican
8		Ethan Berkowitz	July 1, 2015	October 23, 2020	Democratic
-		Austin Quinn-Davidson (Acting)	October 23, 2020	July 1, 2021	Independent
9		Dave Bronson	July 1, 2021	July 1, 2024	Republican
10		Suzanne LaFrance	July 1, 2024	Incumbent	Independent

== See also ==
- History of Anchorage, Alaska
- Timeline of Anchorage, Alaska
