= Grant Reed =

American politician

6th Mayor of Anchorage, Alaska
- In office April 9, 1928 – April 10, 1929
- Preceded by: Will Clayson
- Succeeded by: James Delaney

Personal details
- Born: June 17, 1868 Vernon, Michigan
- Died: February 6, 1942 Long Beach, California

Grant Reed (c. 1869 – 1942) was an American politician who served as the sixth mayor of Anchorage, Alaska, from 1928 to 1929.

== Biography ==
Reed moved to Skagway, Alaska in 1900 to work for the White Pass and Yukon Route In 1908, he took a job with the Alaska Steamship Company, and later worked for the Copper River and Northwestern Railway in Cordova. Reed went to work for the Alaska Railroad in 1920. In 1921, he moved to Anchorage and opened a women's apparel store called Reed's with his wife, Sadie.

Reed was elected to two terms on the City Council, in 1923 and 1926. In 1928, Reed was elected to a single term as Mayor of Anchorage. He continued to work concurrently for the railroad.

In 1936, Reed retired from the Alaska Railroad. A widower, he remarried in 1939. In 1940, he and his wife, Agnes Sayers of Ketchikan moved to Long Beach, California, where Reed died in 1942 at the age of 73.

Preceded by Will Clayson	Mayor of Anchorage; 1928–1929	Succeeded by James Delaney
