= Jesse D. Lander =

American politician (1892–1960)

Speaker of the Alaska Territorial House of Representatives
- In office 1945–1947
- Preceded by: James V. Davis
- Succeeded by: Oscar S. Gill

Member of the Alaska Territorial House of Representatives
- In office 1939–1947
- Constituency: 4th District

Personal details
- Born: February 16, 1892 Nipomo, California, United States
- Died: August 19, 1960 (aged 68) Seattle, Washington, United States
- Party: Democratic
- Profession: Businessman

Military service
- Branch/service: United States Army
- Years of service: 1910s

Jesse Dewayne Lander (February 16, 1892 – August 19, 1960) was an American businessman and Democratic politician who served as Speaker of the Alaska Territorial House of Representatives from 1945 to 1947.

== Early life and education ==
Lander was born in the ranching community of Nipomo, California on February 16, 1892. He enlisted in the United States Army for three years in the 1910s. After leaving the service he trained as a barber and in 1923 moved north to Anchorage, Alaska, where he opened his own shop. In 1925, he relocated to Seward, Alaska, and operated a combined billiard hall and barber shop before settling permanently in Fairbanks, Alaska, in 1932.

== Career ==
Lander became active in civic organizations including the Elks, the Eagles, the Pioneers of Alaska, the Veterans of Foreign Wars and the American Legion while running his Fairbanks enterprises. He entered territorial politics as a Democrat and won election to represent the Fourth District in the Alaska House of Representatives in 1938, taking office at the opening of the Thirteenth Legislature in January 1939. He was re-elected in every biennial contest through 1944 and served continuously until 1947. When the Seventeenth Legislature convened on January 22, 1945, he was unanimously chosen temporary speaker and soon afterward formally elected Speaker of the House. As presiding officer, he oversaw passage of measures that included the Alaska Anti-Discrimination Act of 1945 and legislation preparing the territory for post-war housing and administrative reorganization.

== Death ==
Lander died in Seattle on August 19, 1960, and was buried following funeral rites in Fairbanks on August 24 under the joint auspices of Igloo 4 Pioneers of Alaska, the Veterans of Foreign Wars and the American Legion.
