= Anton Anderson =

American engineer and politician

- Born: Anton Albert Andrew Anderson; 1892; Moonlight, New Zealand
- Died: 1960 (aged 67–68)
- Monuments: Anton Anderson Memorial Tunnel
- Occupations: Engineer, local politician
- Known for: Serving as chief engineer of the Alaska Railroad
- Notable work: Anton Anderson Memorial Tunnel
- Spouse: Alma Menge (m. 1927)
- Children: 3

Mayor of Anchorage
- In office 1956–1958
- Preceded by: Ken Hinchey
- Succeeded by: Hewitt Lounsbury

Military service
- Allegiance: United States
- Branch/service: United States Army
- Unit: US Army Corps of Engineers
- Battles/wars: World War II

Anton Albert Andrew Anderson (1892–1960) was chief engineer of the Alaska Railroad and served as Mayor of Anchorage, Alaska from 1956 to 1958. He has been called "Mr. Alaska Railroad".

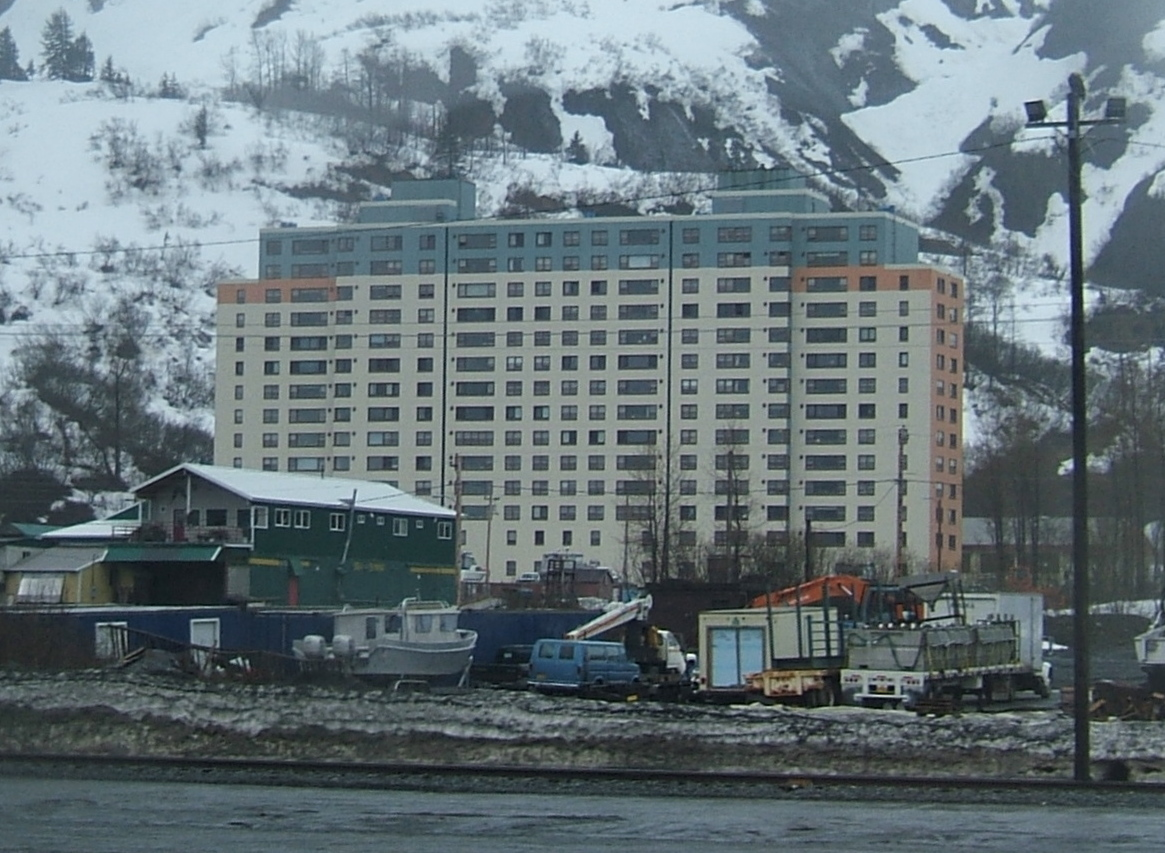
The Hodge Building (later renamed Begich Towers) which Anderson designed

== Biography ==
Anderson was born in Upper Moonlight, New Zealand to a Swedish father and an Irish mother. In 1914, he moved to the United States to work as a surveyor in Hoquiam, Washington. He passed an engineering examination at Seattle University before moving to the recently founded city of Anchorage, Alaska to work for the Alaskan Engineering Commission. In 1927, he married Alma Menge, with whom he had three daughters: Jean, Patricia and Shelby.

In the 1930s, Anderson worked on the Matanuska Colonization Project, building infrastructure to support the settlement of the Matanuska Valley. During World War II, he served in the United States Army Corps of Engineers. He also participated in the construction of the Eklutna River hydroelectric dam. In 1951, he was elected President of the American Society of Mechanical Engineers.

Anderson served on the Anchorage City Council before being appointed in 1956 to complete the term of Mayor Ken Hinchey. Anderson was elected the following year, but ill health forced him to resign early.

Anderson died in 1960. In 1976, the tunnel from Whittier to Portage, which he had overseen, was renamed the Anton Anderson Memorial Tunnel.

Preceded by Ken Hinchey	Mayor of Anchorage; 1956 – 1958	Succeeded by Hewitt Lounsbury
