= George Byer =

American politician (1912–2000)

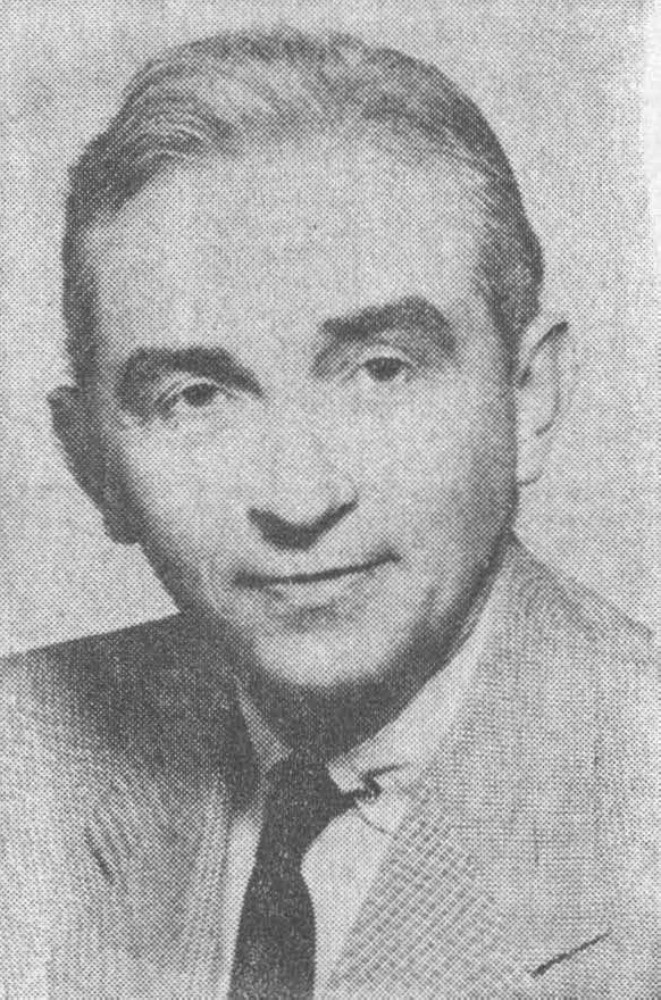
- Byer in 1959

23rd Mayor of Anchorage, Alaska
- In office October 7, 1959 – October 9, 1961
- Preceded by: Hewitt Lounsbury
- Succeeded by: George Sharrock

Personal details
- Born: George Henry Byer; June 22, 1912
- Died: August 22, 2000 (aged 88) Hemet, California, U.S.
- Party: Democratic
- Occupation: Politician, mail carrier

Military service
- Allegiance: United States
- Branch/service: United States Army
- Battles/wars: World War II

George Henry Byer (June 22, 1912 – August 22, 2000) was an American politician who served as Mayor of Anchorage, Alaska from 1959 to 1961. He was the first full-time mayor of Anchorage, and was chiefly responsible for Anchorage's first two All-America City Award designations.

He was a Democrat.

== Biography ==
George Byer, born on June 22, 1912, moved to Alaska in 1947, after serving in the United States Army during World War II. From 1951, he worked as a mail carrier. In 1956, he campaigned successfully to have Anchorage named as "All-America City".

in 1959 Byer was elected mayor of the city, serving two terms.

From 1963 to 1966 he served on the Anchorage City Council, during which time he lobbied to renew Anchorage's "All-America City" status (1965), and launched an unsuccessful bid to bring the 1972 Winter Olympics to Anchorage.

In 1962, Byer unsuccessfully ran for the Democratic nomination for governor.

In September 1963, Byer won an election to serve as chairman of a Greater Anchorage Borough if such an office were to be created by concurrent referendum. However, Greater Anchorage voters rejected incorporating as a borough, and no such office was created. Byer unsuccessfully ran again to hold a prospective chairman office, in December 1963, but lost to John M. Asplund (who was elected to serve as the borough's inaugural chairman). In 1967, Byer ran once again for Mayor of Anchorage, but lost to George M. Sullivan.

In his later years, Byer lived in Hemet, California and was active in efforts to promote world peace.

Byer died, age 88, of heart disease in Hemet on August 22, 2000.

Preceded by Hewitt Lounsbury	Mayor of Anchorage; 1959–1961	Succeeded by George Sharrock
