= Thomas J. McCroskey =

Alaskan politician (1874–1948)

9th Mayor of Anchorage, Alaska
- In office April 7, 1933 – January 1, 1934
- Preceded by: Oscar S. Gill
- Succeeded by: Oscar S. Gill

Personal details
- Born: 1874
- Died: October 28, 1948 (aged 73–74)

Thomas J. McCroskey (1874 – October 28, 1948) was an American politician who served as the ninth mayor of Anchorage, Alaska, from 1933 to 1934.

== Biography ==
Tom McCroskey was born into a Santa Maria Valley pioneer family in Santa Barbara, California in 1874. He took part in the Fairbanks Gold Rush, moving to Fairbanks, Alaska in 1904 in order to prospect for gold. He took a job with the Alaska Road Commission in Fairbanks, and transferred to Anchorage in 1927.

In 1933, McCroskey defeated Carl E. Martin, 387 to 363 votes to become Mayor of Anchorage. He served a single term, and did not run again. In 1938, he retired to Santa Barbara, where he died on October 28, 1948, at the age of 74.

Preceded by Oscar S. Gill	Mayor of Anchorage; 1933–1934	Succeeded by Oscar S. Gill
