= George Vaara =

American politician (1899–1976)

14th Mayor of Anchorage, Alaska
- In office April 8, 1940 – April 9, 1941
- Preceded by: Herbert E. Brown
- Succeeded by: William Alex Stolt

Personal details
- Born: May 26, 1899
- Died: July 26, 1976 (aged 77)

George Vaara (May 26, 1899 – July 26, 1976) was an American politician who served as the 14th mayor of Anchorage, Alaska, from 1940 to 1941.

== Biography ==
George Vaara was born May 26, 1899, in Ada, Minnesota. He moved to Anchorage in 1923 and worked as a clerk in a Piggly Wiggly grocery store. In the 1930s, he opened a notions store called Vaara Varieties. He was elected president of the Anchorage School Board in 1939.

Vaara was elected mayor in 1940 in the midst of a housing shortage brought on by the arrival of military personnel preceding the construction of Fort Richardson. He served a single term.

Vaara built a Pepsi-Cola plant on Fifth Avenue in 1943, selling it fifteen years later.

In 1958, Vaara made a bid for nomination as the Republican candidate for governor of the new state of Alaska. He withdrew several days later, citing a "heated controversy" between factions of the party.

Vaara moved to Seattle, Washington in 1960. He died at his home in Seattle on July 26, 1976, following a year of incapacitation due to a stroke.

Preceded by Herbert E. Brown	Mayor of Anchorage; 1940–1941	Succeeded by William Alex Stolt
