= Maynard L. Taylor Jr. =

American politician (1917–1992)

20th Mayor of Anchorage, Alaska
- In office 1951–1955
- Preceded by: Z. J. Loussac
- Succeeded by: Ken Hinchey

Personal details
- Born: Maynard Loren Taylor Jr. March 22, 1917 Seattle, Washington, U.S.
- Died: November 23, 1992 (aged 75) Sun City West, Arizona, U.S.
- Resting place: Wickenburg Cemetery, Wickenburg, Arizona, U.S.
- Spouse: Lavaun Berg (m. 1944)
- Children: 3
- Education: University of Washington
- Occupation: Politician

Military service
- Allegiance: United States
- Branch/service: United States Army (United States Army Medical Corps)
- Years of service: 1939–1941

Maynard Loren Taylor Jr. (March 12, 1917 – November 23, 1992) was an American politician who served as the 20th mayor of Anchorage, Alaska, from 1951 to 1955.

Maynard Taylor was born March 12, 1917, in Seattle, Washington. He studied architecture at the University of Washington. From 1939 to 1941, he served in the U.S. Army Medical Corps. Taylor moved to Anchorage, Alaska, in 1941 to work for the U.S. Army Corps of Engineers as part of the military build-up in Alaska prior to the United States' formal involvement in World War II. In Alaska, Taylor met Lavaun Berg of Basalt, Idaho, who was working as an army nurse. They were married in Seward in 1944. They would go on to have two sons, Tom and Maynard, and a daughter, Toni.

After the war, Maynard set up an architectural firm, with Lavaun serving as secretary. He was employed by the Civil Aviation Administration and the Alaska Railroad, and taught at the newly founded Anchorage Community College, the predecessor to the University of Alaska Anchorage.

In 1952, Taylor was elected to the first of four consecutive terms as mayor of Anchorage. The same year, he was nominated as president of the League of Alaska Cities (later known as the Alaska Municipal League). He went on to found the community of Basher in what would eventually come to be known as the Stuckagain Heights neighborhood of Anchorage, in the foothills of the Chugach Mountains. He served as mayor of Basher from 1959 to 1972.

Taylor designed and Managed the Hillside Apartments on 16th Ave between G & H Streets in Anchorage. The third floor of this building was severely damaged during the 1964 Good Friday earthquake and was subsequently demolished. I Street was later expanded and is known as the Walter J Hickel Parkway.

In 1976, Taylor partnered with Bill Bittner to develop the Paso Del Sol subdivision in Congress, Arizona. The Taylors split their time between Arizona and Alaska until Taylor's death in 1992.

Maynard Taylor died November 23, 1992, in Sun City West, Arizona, and was buried at Wickenburg Cemetery, Wickenburg, Arizona. Lavaun Taylor died February 28, 2002, in Provo, Utah.

Preceded by Zachariah J. Loussac	Mayor of Anchorage; 1951–1955	Succeeded by Ken Hinchey
