= Hewitt Lounsbury =

American engineer and politician

Hewitt V. "Hoots" Lounsbury (February 22, 1911 – January 9, 1971) was an American engineer and politician. Lounsbury served as the mayor of Anchorage, Alaska from 1958 to 1959, following the resignation of Anton Anderson for health reasons.

Hewitt V. Lounsbury was born in St. Paul, Minnesota on February 22, 1911. He came to the then-territory of Alaska in May 1944 with the U.S. Army Corps of Engineers. In 1949, he founded Lounsbury and Associates, a surveying and engineering firm. He died at the age of 59 on January 9, 1971, in Honolulu, Hawaii.

He had three sons with his wife, Ester: Loren H., Joel and Jon. Loren Lounsbury followed in his father's footsteps in both business and politics. He opened up his own engineering and surveying firm, has served on the board of directors of First National Bank Alaska since 1976, and also briefly served in the gubernatorial cabinet of Bill Sheffield.

Preceded by Anton Anderson	Mayor of Anchorage; 1958 – 1959	Succeeded by George Byer
