= George Sharrock =

American politician (1910–2005)

Mayor of Anchorage
- In office 1961–1964
- Preceded by: George Byer
- Succeeded by: Elmer E. Rasmuson

Personal details
- Born: George Ormand Sharrock

George Ormand Sharrock (May 2, 1910 – March 6, 2005) was Mayor of Anchorage from 1961 to 1964. He is sometimes known as "The Earthquake Mayor" for having been in office during the Good Friday earthquake of 1964, and for his work in the aftermath.

== Biography ==
George Sharrock was born May 2, 1910, in Zanesville, Ohio. He grew up in Canton, Ohio, where he attended Stark Elementary School and graduated from McKinley High School. After spending a number of years as a factory supervisor in Ypsilanti, Michigan, he came to Alaska in 1947 to work for Pacific Northern Airlines, which was later merged into Western Airlines.

He served on the Anchorage City Council from 1959 to 1961, when he was elected mayor. In the wake of the earthquake, he decided not to run for re-election. In 1972, he was appointed Commissioner of Commerce by Governor Walter Hickel. In 1969, he was appointed Chairman of the Federal Field Committee for Development Planning in Alaska by President Richard Nixon.

He died from complications of a fall March 6, 2005 at the age of 94. He had a son, Patrick and a daughter, Diane, with his wife, Pauline.

Preceded by George Byer	Mayor of Anchorage; 1961–1964	Succeeded by Elmer E. Rasmuson
