= Ray Wolfe =

American politician (1905–1977)

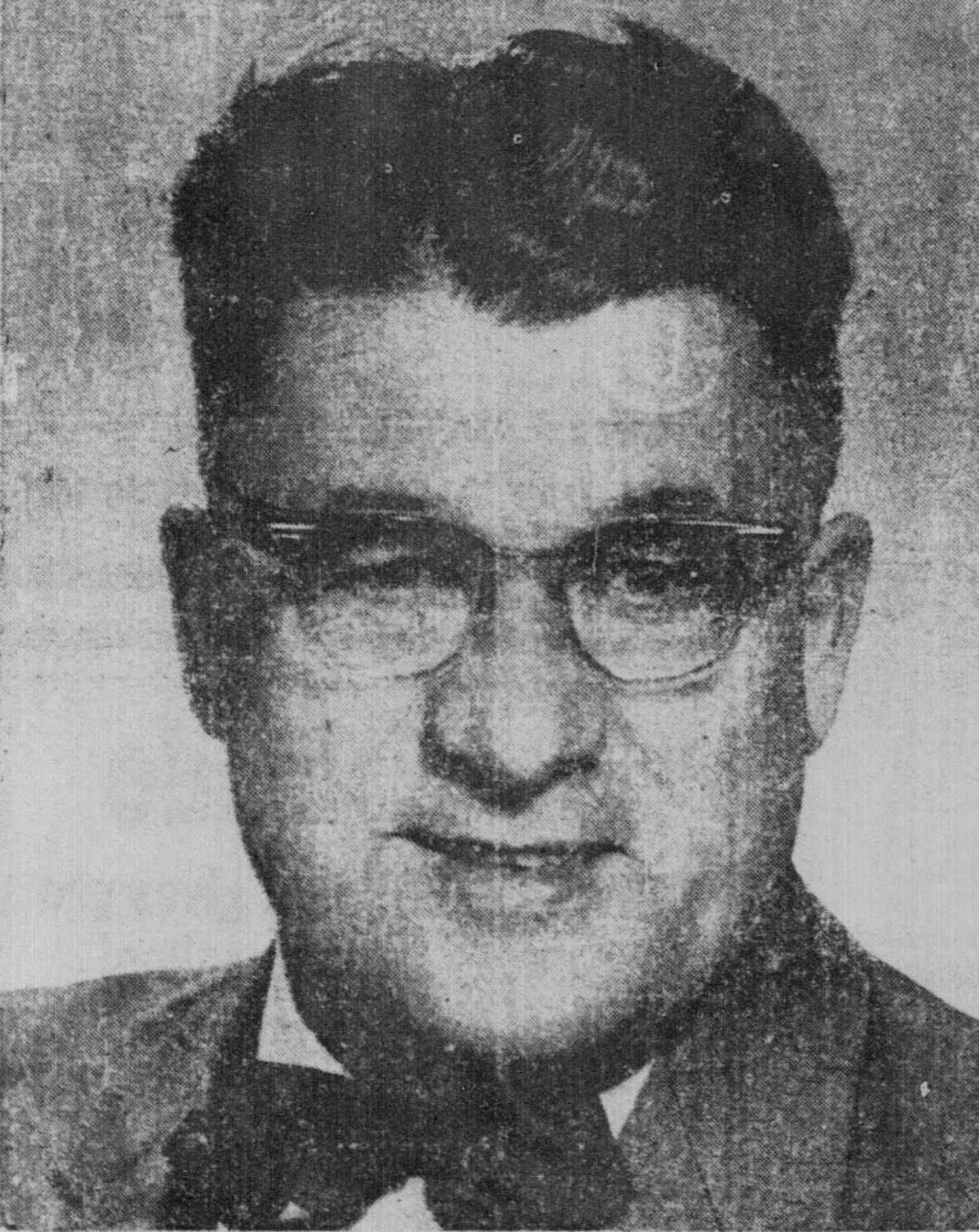

16th Mayor of Anchorage, Alaska
- In office April 10, 1944 – April 9, 1945
- Preceded by: William Alex Stolt
- Succeeded by: John E. Manders

Personal details
- Born: September 23, 1905 West Liberty, Iowa, U.S.
- Died: October 5, 1977 (aged 72) Anchorage, Alaska, U.S.
- Party: Republican
- Occupation: Politician

Ray Wolfe (September 23, 1905 – October 5, 1977) was an American politician who served as the 16th mayor of Anchorage, Alaska, from 1944 to 1945.

== Biography ==
Ray G. Wolfe was born September 23, 1905, in West Liberty, Iowa. He moved to Alaska in January 1927 to work for his uncle in a sheet metal shop at the intersection of Fifth Avenue and C Street. In the years to follow, he purchased the business and converted it into Wolfe's Department Store.

Wolfe was elected to a single term as Mayor of Anchorage in 1944. In 1960, he ran a failed campaign for a seat in the Alaska Senate as a Republican.

In 1972, Wolfe sold the department store to his nephew, Jerry Wolf, who renamed it Wolf's Home Furnishings.

Wolfe died the morning of October 5, 1977 at Providence Hospital in Anchorage.

Preceded by William Alex Stolt	Mayor of Anchorage; 1944–1945	Succeeded by John E. Manders
