= James Delaney (mayor) =

American politician

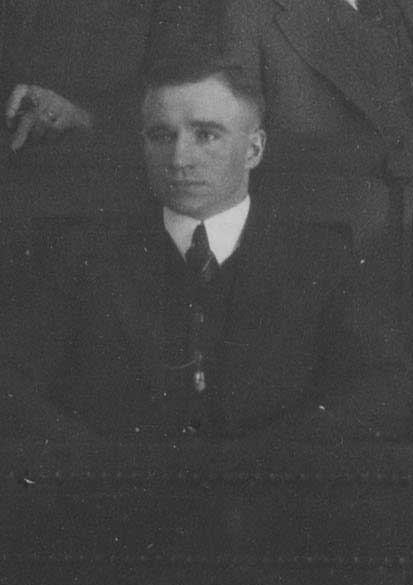
- Delaney in 1924

7th Mayor of Anchorage, Alaska
- In office 1929–1932
- Preceded by: Grant Reed
- Succeeded by: Oscar S. Gill

Personal details
- Born: August 26, 1896; Castlerea, County Roscommon, Ireland
- Died: April 20, 1970 (aged 73)
- Resting place: Anchorage Memorial Park, Anchorage, Alaska, U.S.
- Spouse: Nancy Marie Dillon (m. 1929)
- Children: 3
- Profession: Politician

James Delaney (August 26, 1896 – April 20, 1970) was an American politician who served as the seventh mayor of Anchorage, Alaska from 1929 to 1932.

== Biography ==
James J. Delaney, Sr. was born in Castlerea, County Roscommon, Ireland on August 26, 1896. He came to Anchorage, Alaska in 1916 to work on the railroad for the Alaskan Engineering Commission (known after its 1923 completion as the Alaska Railroad). In 1929, he married Nancy Marie Dillon (born March 5, 1896, in Aghamore, County Mayo, Ireland). The Delaneys had three children: Nancy, James, Jr., and Loretta.

In 1929, Delaney was elected to the first of three consecutive terms as Mayor. His first year in office, he successfully petitioned the United States General Land Office for the title to the land that would become Merrill Field. The field abutting downtown which was serving as an airstrip at that time was renamed the Delaney Park Strip, in 1971. According to Delaney, his "biggest [political] mistake" was ordering the removal of several brothels from near the strip during the 1930s, as that only caused the prostitution to move elsewhere.

Delaney died April 20, 1970, and was buried in Anchorage Memorial Park; Nancy would survive him by 16 years, dying in Anchorage on December 29, 1986.

Preceded by Grant Reed	Mayor of Anchorage; 1929–1932	Succeeded by Oscar S. Gill
