= December 1963 Greater Anchorage Borough election =

Local election in Alaska

1963 Greater Anchorage Borough election
- December 3, 1963

The 1963 Greater Anchorage Borough election was an incorporation election for the borough government in Anchorage, Alaska. It was held on December 3, 1963. 6,597 ballots were cast.

== Background ==
In a September 24, 1963 election, the Greater Anchorage region had rejected incorporating as a borough. During this election, George Byer (former City of Anchorage mayor) had won an election to serve as borough chairman if such an office were to have been created by concurrent referendums.

The state legislature mandated that former election districts would be reconstituted as boroughs on January 1, 1964, and that mandatory balloting would take place to select what form of government the boroughs would adopt, which classification of borough they would be incorporated as, and who would serve as elected officers for their governments. In December 1963, mandatory incorporation elections were held three so-called "mandatory" boroughs in South-Central Alaska: Anchorage, Kenai Peninsula, and Matanuska. A similar election was also held in the new Fairbanks borough.

== Vote on whether borough should be a first or second class borough ==
Vote on whether borough should be a first or second class borough
Candidate	Votes	%
Second class	3,393	52.54
First class	3,065	47.46
Total votes	6,458	100

== Vote on the form of government for the borough ==
Results of vote on the form of government
Candidate	Votes	%
Chairman	3,673	58.53
Council-manager	2,602	41.47
Total votes	6,275	100

== Borough chairman ==
Borough chairman
Party	Candidate	Votes	%
Nonpartisan	John M. Asplund	3,186	51.04
Nonpartisan	George Byer	2,471	39.59
Nonpartisan	J. J. McCutcheon	389	6.23
Nonpartisan	Larry Carmichael	136	2.18
Nonpartisan	Elsie M. Cornell	60	0.96
Total votes		6,242	100

== Borough assemblymen ==
=== Section 1 ===
Borough assemblyman for section 1
Party	Candidate	Votes	%
Nonpartisan	Glenn Briggs	1,117	42.63
Nonpartisan	Edward C. "Ed" Willis	1,007	38.44
Nonpartisan	Dan C. Bell	496	18.93
Total votes		2,620	100

=== Section 2 ===
Borough assemblyman for section 2
Party	Candidate	Votes	%
Nonpartisan	Walter E. Jerde	870	39.24
Nonpartisan	Dick Reed Lyon	750	33.83
Nonpartisan	Thomas S. Adams	597	26.93
Total votes		2,217	100

=== Section 3 ===
Borough assemblyman for section 3
Party	Candidate	Votes	%
Nonpartisan	John M. Asplund	1,463	55.65
Nonpartisan	J. J. McCutcheon	605	23.01
Nonpartisan	Joseph W. "Joe" Graham	338	12.86
Nonpartisan	A. D. Hess Powell	138	5.25
Nonpartisan	Theodore G. "Ted" Smith	85	3.23
Total votes		2,629	100

=== Section 4 ===
Borough assemblyman for section 4
Party	Candidate	Votes	%
Nonpartisan	John Glenn Gill	1,216	52.35
Nonpartisan	Dave Ring	1,107	47.65
Total votes		2,323	100

=== Section 5 ===
Borough assemblyman for section 5
Party	Candidate	Votes	%
Nonpartisan	Mable H. Crawford	996	38.85
Nonpartisan	James M. Garrigues	847	33.03
Nonpartisan	Vernon E. Haik	721	28.12
Total votes		2,564	100

=== Section 6 ===
Borough assemblyman for section 6
Party	Candidate	Votes	%
Nonpartisan	William M. "Bill" Shear	1,145	44.45
Nonpartisan	Lawrence "Larry" Straley	686	26.63
Nonpartisan	Larry Carmichael	529	20.54
Nonpartisan	Harold N. Aldrich	216	8.39
Total votes		2,576	100

== Borough school board ==
Borough school board election
Party	Candidate	Votes	%
Nonpartisan	Frank M. Reed	4,169	
Nonpartisan	Keith M. Lesh	3,831	
Nonpartisan	Richard R. Gay	3,785	
Nonpartisan	Marilyn Wilkins	3,697	
Nonpartisan	Willis Avery	3,559	
Nonpartisan	William J. Moran	3,429	
Nonpartisan	John C. Hughes	2,999	
Nonpartisan	Ralph M. Mills	2,108	
Nonpartisan	Paul L. Weatherman	1,913	
Nonpartisan	B. W. "Bud" Hardesty	1,814	
Nonpartisan	Donald E. "Don" White	1,714	
Nonpartisan	Joseph W. "Joe" Graham	1,622	
Nonpartisan	Elsie M. Cornell	1,316	
Total votes			
