= Winfield Ervin Jr. =

American politician

Winfield Ervin Jr. (1902–1985) was a mayor of Anchorage, Alaska.

== Biography ==
Ervin was born in 1902 in Portland, Oregon to Winfield Ervin Sr., a native of Lebanon, Oregon and Theora McNall of Oregon. He moved with his family to Lewiston, Idaho and later lived in Bellingham while Ervin Sr. worked for the Brown and Hawkins Company in Alaska. In 1917, the family was reunited in Anchorage, Alaska. In 1922, Ervin Sr. founded First National Bank Alaska.

Ervin Jr. married Velma Lucille Flora Brown in 1937. He served on the City Council, and was appointed Mayor of Anchorage on March 19, 1946, a day after mayor John E. Manders resigned. Ervin stood for election on April 2, but was defeated by Francis C. Bowden, who was sworn into office on April 8.

In 1951, Ervin and Velma moved to Seward, Alaska, where they operated a garage. In 1959, they moved back to Anchorage, where Ervin took a position with the Bureau of Indian Affairs. In 1964, they moved to Seattle.

Ervin died in Seattle, Washington in 1985. He is buried, along with Velma, who died in 2005, in Acacia Memorial Park, near Seattle.

| Preceded by John E. Manders | Mayor of Anchorage; 1946 | Succeeded by Francis C. Bowden |
