= Francis C. Bowden =

American politician (1903–1972)

Francis Clayton Bowden (born Francis Clayton Norris; December 26, 1903 – April 1972) was Mayor of Anchorage, Alaska from 1946 to 1948.

== Biography ==
Francis C. Bowden was born on December 26, 1903, in Roslyn, Washington. He moved to Alaska in 1928 to work for the Curry Hotel on the Alaska Railroad. He worked for drug stores in Cordova and Anchorage in the years that followed.

In 1946, Bowden was elected Mayor of Anchorage, beating incumbent Winfield Ervin Jr., who had been appointed to fill the vacancy left by the resignation of John E. Manders two weeks before the election. He served two terms, and promoted a $2.2 million bond offering to rehabilitate the city's aging public utilities.

In 1948, Bowden became part-owner of Hewitt's Drugstore.

Bowden died in April 1972 at Anchorage Community Hospital.

Preceded by Winfield Ervin Jr.	Mayor of Anchorage; 1946–1948	Succeeded by Zachariah J. Loussac
