= Oscar S. Gill =

American politician (1880–1947)

8th and 10th Mayor of Anchorage, Alaska
- In office April 11, 1932 – April 7, 1933
- Preceded by: James Delaney (mayor)
- Succeeded by: Thomas J. McCroskey
- In office January 1, 1934 – April 11, 1936
- Succeeded by: Herbert E. Brown
- Preceded by: Thomas J. McCroskey

Personal details
- Born: April 3, 1880
- Died: November 8, 1947 (aged 67)
- Party: Republican

Oscar S. Gill (April 3, 1880 – November 18, 1947) was an Alaskan Republican politician. He was Mayor of Anchorage, Alaska, from 1932 to 1933 and 1934 to 1936.

== Biography ==
Oscar Stephen Gill was born April 3, 1880, in St. Lawrence, Pennsylvania. He moved with his wife, Emma Dohrman Gill, to Alaska in 1907. In 1909, he ran a sawmill in Susitna, lived for a time in Knik, carrying mail by dog sled from Seward to Susitna and Iditarod. In 1915, he moved to Ship Creek to work on the Alaska Railroad. As the encampment at Ship Creek grew into the city of Anchorage, Gill put down roots, floating his two-story house down the Knik River to 918 W. 10th Avenue, where it remained until 1982.

From 1916 to 1923, Gill ran a lighterage service under contract with the Alaskan Engineering Commission. In 1923, he opened Anchorage's first garage at the corner of Fourth Avenue and I Street.

In 1929, Gill was elected to the city council, serving until 1932, when he was elected Mayor of Anchorage for one term. He did not stand for election in 1933, but ran for a second, non-consecutive term in 1934. He was elected without opposition on the ballot and served two more terms as mayor. His son, Victor Gill, made an unsuccessful bid to succeed him as Mayor of Anchorage in 1936.

In 1944, Oscar Gill was elected to the Alaska Territorial House of Representatives, representing the 3rd District. He was re-elected in 1946, becoming Speaker of the House in 1947. He died while still in office, November 18, 1947, and was buried in the Anchorage Memorial Park.

The Oscar Gill House, threatened with demolition in 1982, was purchased by the Municipality of Anchorage and moved into storage. In 1994 it was restored to a new location at 1344 W. 10th Avenue. It now houses a bed and breakfast.

Preceded by James Delaney	Mayor of Anchorage; 1932–1933	Succeeded by Thomas J. McCroskey
Preceded by Thomas J. McCroskey	Mayor of Anchorage; 1934–1936	Succeeded by Herbert E. Brown
Preceded by Jesse D. Lander	Speaker of the Alaska House of Representatives; 1947	Succeeded by Stanley McCutcheon
