= William Alex Stolt =

American politician (1900–2001)

15th Mayor of Anchorage, Alaska
- In office April 9, 1941 – April 10, 1944
- Preceded by: George Vaara
- Succeeded by: Ray Wolfe

Personal details
- Born: July 5, 1900
- Died: February 28, 2001 (aged 100)

William Alex Stolt (July 5, 1900 – February 28, 2001) was an American politician who served as the 15th mayor of Anchorage, Alaska, from 1941 to 1944.

== Biography ==
William Alex Stolt was born to Finnish parents in Boston, Massachusetts on July 5, 1900. He spent the first ten years of his life in Finland, moving back to the United States after the death of his father, and his mother's remarriage to a man in Seattle. In 1913, the family moved to Juneau, and then Anchorage in 1917. He attended Anchorage High School, graduating in 1920. He studied electrical engineering at Washington State College, and in 1929 married Lily, another student from Anchorage.

Stolt worked as an electrician, operating Bill's Electric Shop & Supply in Anchorage. In 1938, he filed for a Homestead Act claim on land near Otter Lake that was later incorporated into Fort Richardson. He built a cabin with his brother Paul and lived there for a time, but he abandoned the claim in 1942.

Stolt lobbied for the Municipality of Anchorage to purchase Anchorage Light and Power Company and their Eklutna power plant in order to provide the fledgling city with better electrification. He ran successfully for city council and then, in 1941, mayor. The population of Anchorage at the time was about 5,000 residents.

In December 1941, in response to the Japanese bombing of Pearl Harbor and under the advice of Colonel Simon Bolivar Buckner, Jr., Stolt ordered a partial blackout of Anchorage.

In 1943, with Stolt in office, a municipal bond measure passed authorizing the purchase of Anchorage Light and Power, and in 1944, operation of the plant passed to Anchorage Public Utilities.

Stolt founded Stolt's Home Center, which grew out of his electrical supply business and eventually became a retailer of consumer electronics. Originally located at 1000 East Fourth Avenue, the business eventually moved two blocks to the south, to the corner of East Sixth Avenue and Juneau Street, to take advantage of the better location when the business became more of a mass market retailer. Stolt's also operated a store in the Dimond Center before closing in 1993.

In 1994, Stolt was paid the back salary—totaling $1—for his last year as mayor in 1944. Stolt died in the Anchorage Pioneer Home on February 28, 2001.

== Legacy ==
Stolt Lane in Anchorage, which runs from the western end of West Eighth Avenue to the northern end of S Street in the Bootleggers Cove or Inlet View neighborhood just outside downtown Anchorage, was named for Stolt. It is also the street where his home of many years is located.

== Bibliography ==
- Stolt, William and Lillian "Bill and Lily: Two Alaskans" 1998 (ISBN 1-888125-16-0)

Preceded by George Vaara	Mayor of Anchorage; 1941–1944	Succeeded by Ray Wolfe
