= John E. Manders =

American politician (1895–1973)

17th Mayor of Anchorage, Alaska
- In office April 9, 1945 – March 18, 1946
- Preceded by: Ray Wolfe
- Succeeded by: Francis C. Bowden

Personal details
- Born: February 3, 1895 Denver, Colorado, U.S.
- Died: February 18, 1973 (aged 78) Anchorage, Alaska, U.S.
- Party: Republican
- Spouse: Henrietta Bertolas (m. 1914)
- Education: University of San Francisco; San Francisco Law School
- Occupation: Politician, lawyer

John E. Manders (February 3, 1895 – February 18, 1973) was an American politician who served as the 17th mayor of Anchorage, Alaska, from 1945 to 1946 and was a leading voice among opponents of Alaskan statehood.

== Biography ==
John Edgar Manders was born February 3, 1895, in Denver, Colorado to Robert Francis Manders and Letha Clementine Barnes Manders. In 1914, he married Henrietta Bertolas. He attended the University of San Francisco and the San Francisco Law School, and was admitted to the California Bar in 1918. He practiced law in San Francisco until 1941, when he moved his practice to Anchorage, Alaska.

In 1945, Manders was elected mayor of Anchorage. He resigned on March 18, 1946, several weeks before his term was complete, in protest of plans to weaken the mayor's office by transferring powers to the city council and to a newly created office of city manager. "I will not be a figurehead in office," he told the press. "I'll not be a Charlie McCarthy for a bunch of Edgar Bergens." City Council member Winfield Ervin Jr. was appointed to serve as mayor until the April 2 elections.

Manders was a tax protester, refusing to pay Federal income tax. In the 1950s, he campaigned against statehood for the Territory of Alaska, earning himself the title of "Statehood Foe #1" from Life Magazine. Manders argued that statehood would increase the taxes of Alaskan citizens. In its place, he advocated commonwealth status for the territory. Manders became known as the "Lone Republican," because much of the rest of Alaska's prospective congressional delegation was dominated by Democrats such as Ernest Gruening, Bob Bartlett, Bill Egan and Ralph Rivers.

In 1958, after the U.S. Senate voted to admit Alaska as the 49th state, he told Time Magazine: "Did you ever see anybody stop a crowd on its way to a hanging? Wait till the honeymoon is over and the taxes arrive ..." In the ensuing special election, he made a bid for one of the new seats in the Senate, but failed to gain the nomination of the Republican Party.

Manders was a familiar sight in downtown Anchorage, where he was often seen walking with a cane and smoking a cigar. He belonged to the Freemasons and the Shriners. He died the morning of February 18, 1973 at Anchorage Community Hospital.

Preceded by Ray Wolfe	Mayor of Anchorage; 1945–1946	Succeeded by Winfield Ervin Jr.
