= David House (computer designer) =

American engineer and computer designer

- Born: 1943 (age 82–83)
- Education: Michigan Technological University (BSc '65); Northeastern University (MSc)

David Lawrence House (born 1943) is an American engineer and computer designer. He was an executive at Intel, where he led the division that produced the company's microprocessor product line. He was one of the key architects of the company's marketing and managed the team that coined the slogan “Intel Inside”, which was used in the advertising campaign that made Intel a household name.

== Biography ==
House completed a BSEE at Michigan Technological University in 1965. He then obtained an MSEE in 1969 from Northeastern University.

=== Career ===
House began his career as a computer designer. He worked for Raytheon’s Computer and Communications Division. Because the company was situated in Norwood, MA, he was able to complete his masters at Northeastern University. At Raytheon, he designed data acquisition and computer communications systems.

House became part of Honeywell Computer Control Division beginning in 1968. His work involved the design of mini computers. In 1972, he became the director of Microdata’s computer development division.. He, he joined Intel in 1974 as “manager of semiconductor memory applications”. He took on greater responsibilities and eventually rose to the position of general manager of the company's Microcomputer Components Division.

In 1971, Intel developed the world's first commercial processor, the 4004. Two other microprocessors followed, the 8008 and 8080, until Intel's leadership in the market began to be challenged by Zilog’s 16-bit microprocessor, Z8000. House addressed the problem by leading the shift in Intel’s corporate culture from purely engineering focused toward marketing.

In his 22 years at Intel, House was credited for growing the microprocessor division of the company from $40 million to $4 billion annually. He launched the company’s Server Product’s Division, establishing the company’s foothold in the service business market. Today, Intel has over 85 percent market share. House also led the team that developed the “Intel Inside” campaign. He was credited for coining “Intel Inside”, an ingredient marketing slogan that helped launch Intel as one of the most recognized brands in the world.

House participated in a well attended IEEE seminar that explored Intel’s Transition to Success: From Memory to the Microprocessor: Ted Hoff, Dave House, Alan J. Weissberger on Oct 1 2013. The description, slides and video for that event revealed his Intel career accomplishments. It can be accessed at: https://californiaconsultants.org/event/intels-transition-to-success-from-memory-to-the-microprocessor/.

After more than two decades, House left Intel and was tapped as the president and CEO of Bay Systems, which was then a struggling company fresh from a merger. He is credited for improving the company's profitability through reorganization, better marketing efforts, new acquisitions, and the creation of new product divisions. In 2001, he became the CEO of the startup company, Allegro. He is currently the chairman of the House Family Foundation and also serves as the chair of the board at the Computer History Museum.

=== Moore’s law ===
House is also noted for his theory related to Moore's law, which holds that the number of transistors that can be placed on an integrated circuit doubles every two years. This period is often identified as 18 months, a period that is part of House's own take on the growth of chip performance.
