= M. Joseph Conroy =

American lawyer

Michael Joseph Conroy
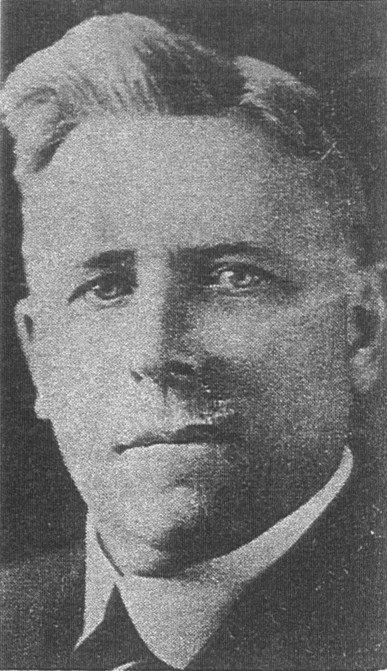

2nd Mayor of Anchorage, Alaska
- In office April 11, 1923 – October 8, 1924
- Preceded by: Leopold David
- Succeeded by: Charles W. Bush

Personal details
- Born: September 20, 1874 Ballyconneely, Republic of Ireland
- Died: September 5, 1946 (aged 71) Anchorage, Alaska
- Spouse: Nellie Rushton Muscott

Michael Joseph Conroy (September 20, 1874 – September 5, 1946) was the second Mayor of Anchorage, Alaska, serving from 1923 to 1924.

== Biography ==
Conroy was born in the village of Ballyconneely, County Galway, Ireland, on September 20, 1874. His family emigrated to the United States in 1880, settling in Manchester, New Hampshire. He worked for the Boston and Maine Railroad until 1904. In 1905, he moved to Seward, Alaska to work on the Alaska Central Railroad. He lived for a time in Cordova, Knik and Valdez, where in 1913 he was admitted to the Alaska Bar Association. He served as United States Commissioner in the Seward-Kenai precinct until 1916. During this time he met and married Nellie Rushton Muscott, a nurse from Simpson, Kansas who was working in Seward for Dr. Joseph H. Romig. In June 1916, the couple moved to Anchorage where Joe found work as a tax assessor for the not-yet incorporated city.

Conroy was elected mayor in 1923, and reelected in 1924. During Conroy's first term in office, President Warren Harding visited Alaska, becoming the first U.S. President to visit the territory. Harding, along with Secretary of Commerce Herbert Hoover and others, arrived in Anchorage on the train from Seward on July 13, 1923 at 9:30 in the evening. Conroy welcomed them in a ceremony on Fourth Avenue, presenting Harding with a Sydney Laurence oil painting of Mount McKinley.

Conroy resigned on October 2, 1924, with City Council member Charles Bush appointed to complete the rest of his term.

Conroy died on September 5, 1946. He is buried in Anchorage Memorial Park Cemetery.

Preceded by Leopold David	Mayor of Anchorage; 1923 – 1924	Succeeded by Charles Bush
