= Delaney Park Strip =

Park in Anchorage, Alaska, United States

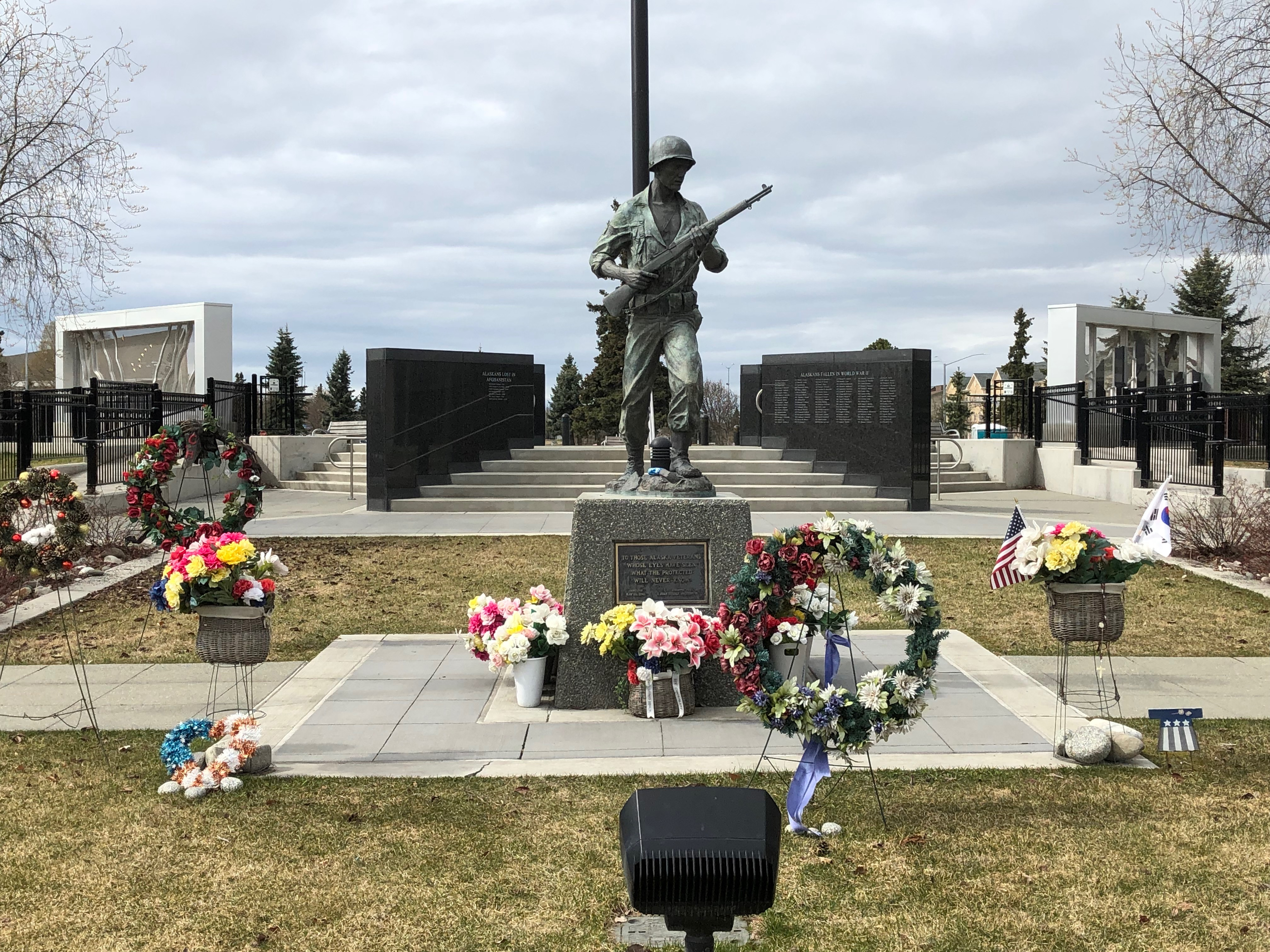
- Alaskan Veterans Memorial at Delaney Park Strip
- Interactive map of Delaney Park Strip
- Type: Urban park
- Location: Anchorage, Alaska, US
- Coordinates: 61°12′48″N 149°54′06″W
- Established: 1917
- Etymology: Named for James Delaney, first mayor of Anchorage

The Delaney Park Strip is an 11-block park in the Municipality of Anchorage, Alaska. Originally a firebreak, the Park Strip would become Anchorage's first airfield.

== History ==
Known to the Anchorage community as the Park Strip, Delaney Park is the oldest park in the city. It was established as part of the original Anchorage township plat in 1917 and named for James Delaney, one of the first mayors of Anchorage.

The park was originally used simply as a firebreak, but in 1923 it became “The Golf Course.” The community used the space both for a golf course and an airstrip.

Anchorage residents, working for free, had prepared a 300 by 2000 foot landing field for Noel Wien to fly Jimmy Rodebaugh's newly arrived Standard J-1. Wien's first flight took place on 4 June 1924, and by the end of the month had flown 170 passengers, two at a time in the front cockpit, on a 15 minute ride. These were the first passenger flights from Anchorage. Wien also started the first flight between Anchorage and Fairbanks from the strip on 6 July.

In 1932, however, Merrill Field opened, so the Delaney Park airstrip was no longer necessary.

In 1954 the Parks & Recreation Department began to develop recreation facilities for a variety of activities and events, including ice skating, softball, horseshoes, and, later, tennis. In 1958 the Park Strip hosted the Alaska Statehood Celebration.

On the 75th anniversary of Noel Wien's historic flight to Fairbanks, his two sons Noel Merrill and Richard, reenacted the flight using a Boeing Stearman, after receiving FAA permission to take off from the park.

Presently, the park is used for a variety of community events, sports, and festivals year-round.

== Facilities ==
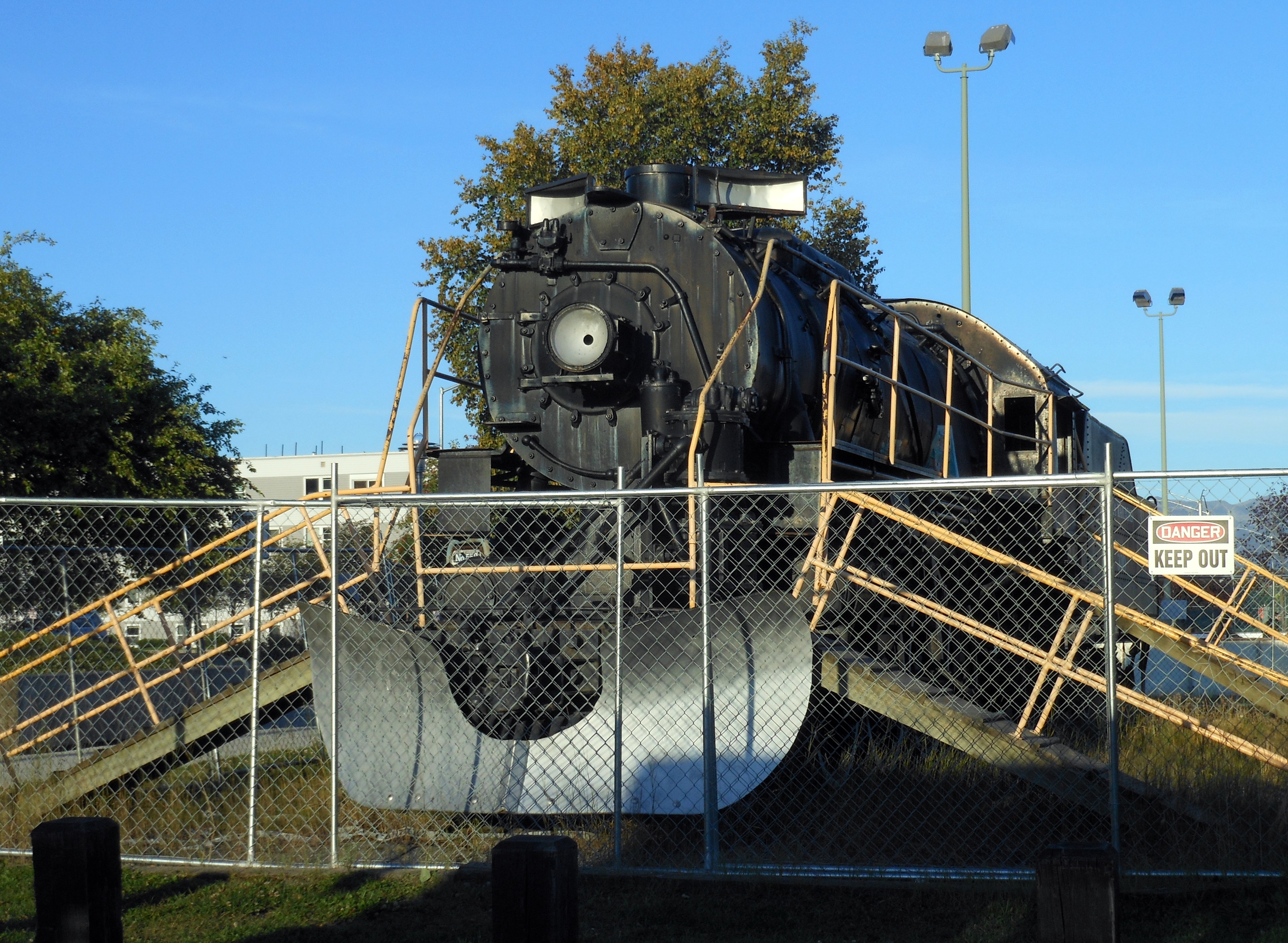
Engine 556, a 2-8-0 built by Baldwin Locomotive Works, was used by the Alaska Railroad in the 1940s and 1950s following initial service in Europe during World War II. The locomotive is shown on display at the southeast corner of Ninth Avenue and E Street, where it has sat since 1959.

- Two soccer fields
- Six softball fields
- Eight tennis courts
- Two sand volleyball courts
- Five horseshoe pits
- Ice hockey rink and ice skating area
- Winter running route around the park
- Fitness center at Pete’s Gym
- Memorial to Pope John Paul II, who visited the Park Strip in 1981
- Martin Luther King, Jr. Memorial
- Victims for Justice Tree
- Purple Heart Memorial
- Aviation Memorial
- E.G. Fenn Memorial
- POW/MIA Tree
- Organ and Tissue Donor Memorial
- C.A. Berg Tree
- R.O. Robertson Tree
- Veterans' Memorial
- Bandstand
- Centennial Rose Garden
- Parking spaces available along 10th Avenue on the park side
