= Leopold David House =

Historic house in Alaska, United States

- U.S. National Register of Historic Places
- Alaska Heritage Resources Survey
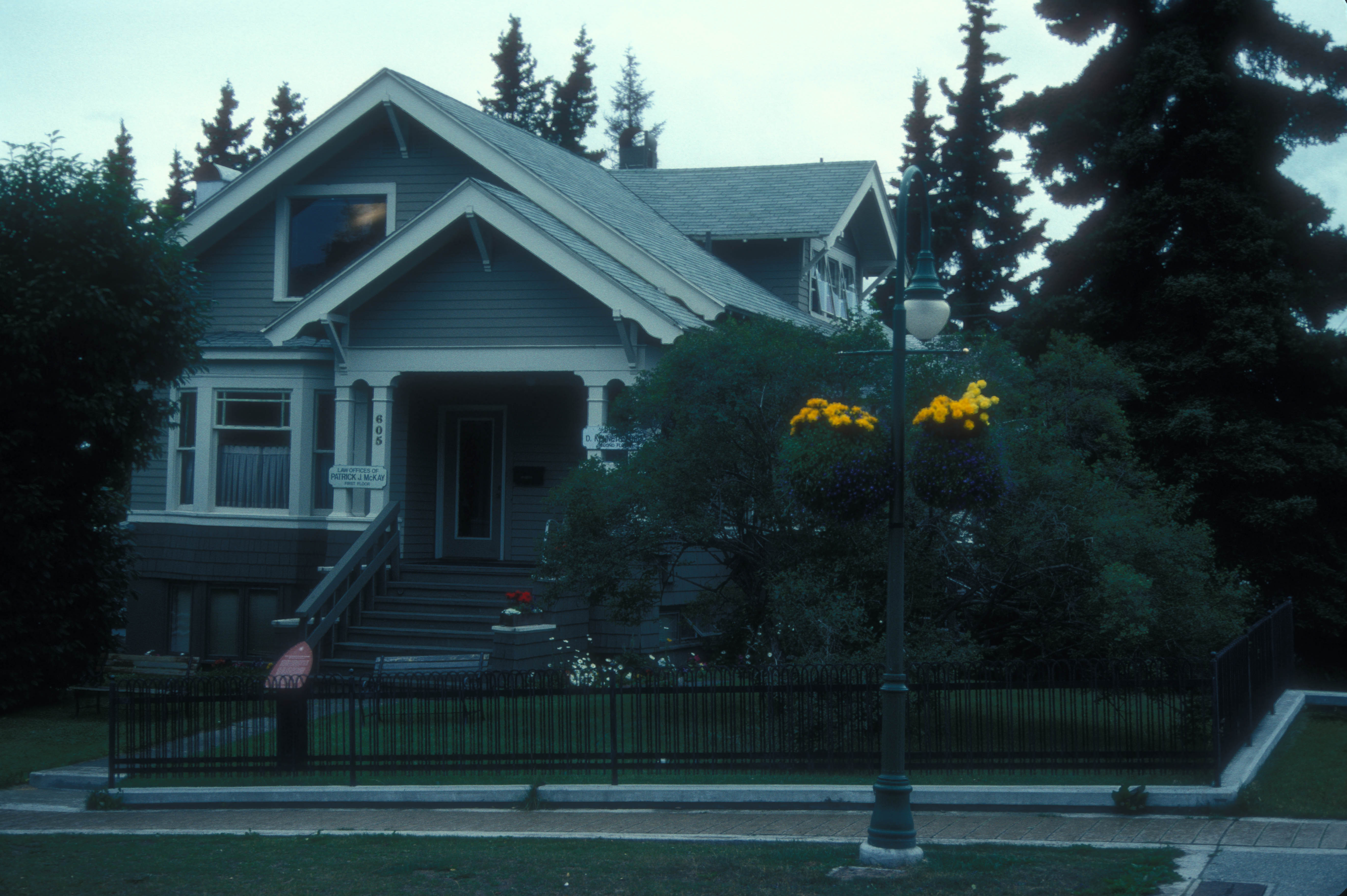

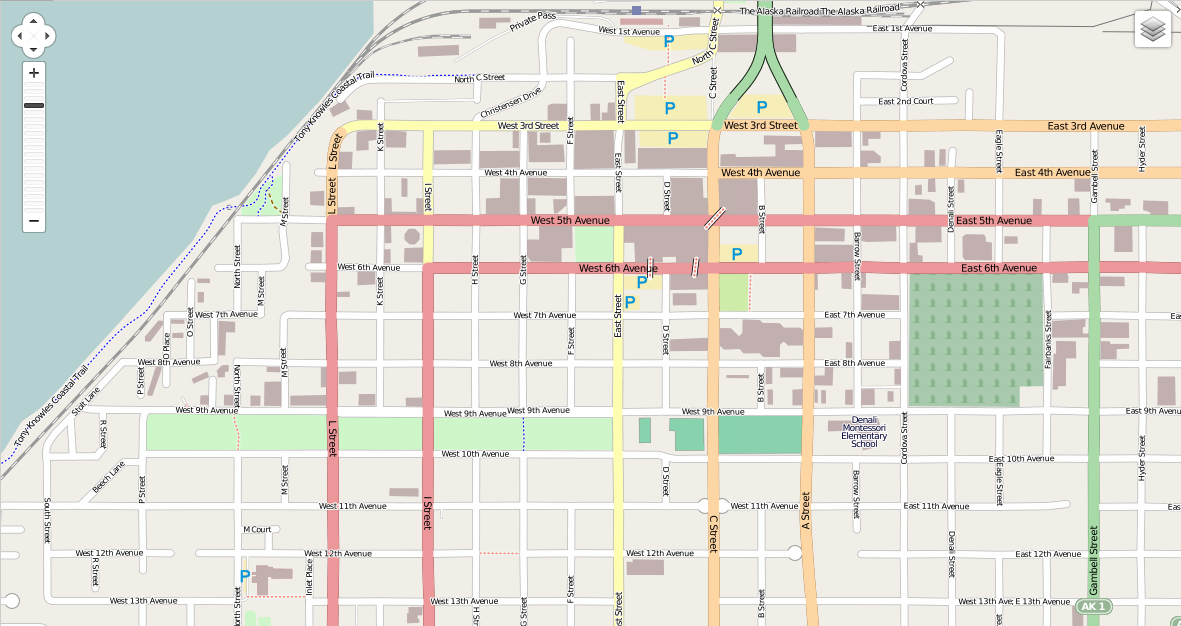
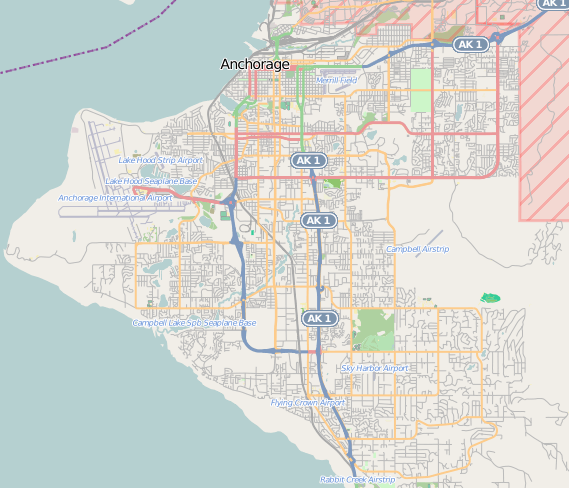
- Location within Downtown Anchorage Location within Anchorage Location within Alaska
- Location: 605 West 2nd Avenue, Anchorage, Alaska
- Coordinates: 61°13′15″N 149°53′38″W
- Area: 0.16 acres (0.065 ha)
- Built: 1917
- Architectural style: Bungalow/craftsman
- NRHP reference No.: 86001900
- AHRS No.: ANC-308
- Added to NRHP: July 24, 1986

The Leopold David House is a historical building located at 605 West Second Avenue in Anchorage, Alaska. It is a 1 1/2-story bungalow-style house with a wooden frame structure. It features a front-gable roof and dormers. The front facade is divided into two sections: the left with a projecting bay section, and the right with a gabled porch. The roofs have deep eaves with Craftsman-style brackets. The house was built about 1917 for Leopold David (1878–1924), an early resident of Anchorage and its first mayor, elected in 1920. It is one of the best-preserved houses of the period in the city.

The house was listed on the National Register of Historic Places in 1986.

== See also ==
- National Register of Historic Places listings in Anchorage, Alaska
