= List of Jewish political milestones in the United States =

The following is a list of Jewish political milestones in the United States.

- First Jewish member of a colonial legislature (South Carolina): Francis Salvador (1775)
- First Jewish soldier killed in the American Revolutionary War: Francis Salvador (1776)
- First Jewish elected official in the United States: Judah Hays; as the Fire Commissioner of the Boston Fire Department (1805)
  - Francis Salvador was elected prior to the formation of the United States.
- First Jewish member of the U.S. Congress (U.S. House of Representatives): Lewis Charles Levin (1845)
- First Jewish member of the U.S. Senate: David Levy Yulee (1845)
- First Jewish mayor of a major American city (Portland, Oregon): Bernard Goldsmith (1869)
  - Two years later, Philip Wasserman succeeded him as mayor.
- First Jewish governor of a U.S. state (California): Washington Bartlett (1887)
- First Jewish U.S. Cabinet member (Secretary of Commerce and Labor): Oscar Straus (1906)
  - Not including Judah P. Benjamin, who served in the Confederate Cabinet as Secretary of State and Secretary of War.
- First Jewish Justice of the U.S. Supreme Court: Louis Brandeis (1916)
  - President Millard Fillmore offered to appoint Judah P. Benjamin to the Supreme Court in 1853, but Benjamin declined.
- First Jewish female member of the U.S. Congress (U.S. House of Representatives): Florence Prag Kahn (1925)
- First Jewish Secretary of the Treasury: Henry Morgenthau Jr. (1934)
- First person of Jewish ancestry to run for President of the United States on a major party ticket: Barry Goldwater (1964) (Goldwater's father was Jewish; Goldwater was raised Episcopalian)
- First person of Sephardic Jewish ancestry to run for President of the United States: Louis Abolafia (1968)
- First Jewish candidate to receive an electoral vote for Vice President: Tonie Nathan of the Libertarian Party, from a faithless elector (1972)
- First Jewish Secretary of State: Henry Kissinger (1973)
- First Jewish Mayor of New York City: Abraham Beame (1974), (Fiorello LaGuardia, who was mayor from 1934 to 1946, was born to an Italian Jewish mother from Trieste and a lapsed Catholic turned atheist father from Apulia; however, he was a Protestant)
- First Jewish Attorney General: Edward H. Levi (1975)
- First Jewish female mayor of a major American city (Dallas): Adlene Harrison (1976)
- First Jewish Secretary of Defense: Harold Brown (1977)
- First Jewish female governor of a U.S. state (Vermont): Madeleine M. Kunin (1985)
- First Jewish openly gay member of the U.S. Congress (U.S. House of Representatives): Barney Frank (took office 1981, disclosed homosexuality 1989)
  - Jared Polis became the first Jewish Congressman to be openly gay upon first election: (2009)
- First U.S. Senate election in which both major party candidates were Jewish: 1990 Minnesota U.S. Senate Election; with Paul Wellstone defeated Rudy Boschwitz (1990)
- First independent Jewish member of the U.S. Congress (U.S. House of Representatives): Bernie Sanders (1991)
- First Jewish female members of the U.S. Senate: Barbara Boxer and Dianne Feinstein (1993)
- First Jewish female Justice of the U.S. Supreme Court: Ruth Bader Ginsburg (1993)
- First female Cabinet-level official: Charlene Barshefsky, U.S. Trade Representative (1997)
- First Jewish nominee for Vice President of the United States on a major party ticket, and first Jewish candidate to receive an electoral vote, excluding faithless electors: Joe Lieberman (2000)
- First Jewish U.S. House whip: Eric Cantor (2009) (also first Jewish whip in either chamber of Congress)
- First Jewish U.S. House floor leader: Eric Cantor (2011)(also first Jewish floor leader and majority leader in either chamber of Congress)
- First Jewish female U.S. Cabinet member in the Presidential Line of Succession (Secretary of Commerce): Penny Pritzker (2013)
- First Jewish American to win a presidential primary (New Hampshire) and delegates: Bernie Sanders (2016) (Barry Goldwater, the 1964 Republican presidential nominee, was the first winner of Jewish heritage, but was a Christian).
- First Jewish American to receive an electoral vote for President: Bernie Sanders, from a faithless elector (2016) (Barry Goldwater was the first of Jewish heritage, in 1964, but was not Jewish)
- First Jewish U.S. Senate floor leader: Chuck Schumer (2017) (also first Jewish minority leader in either chamber of Congress)
- First Jewish Second Gentleman (and first Jewish American spouse of Vice President): Douglas Emhoff (2021)
- First Jewish U.S. Senate majority leader: Chuck Schumer (2021)
- First Jewish female (and the first woman) Secretary of the Treasury: Janet Yellen (2021)

== See also ==
- List of Jewish American politicians
