= Leopold David =

American politician (1878–1924)

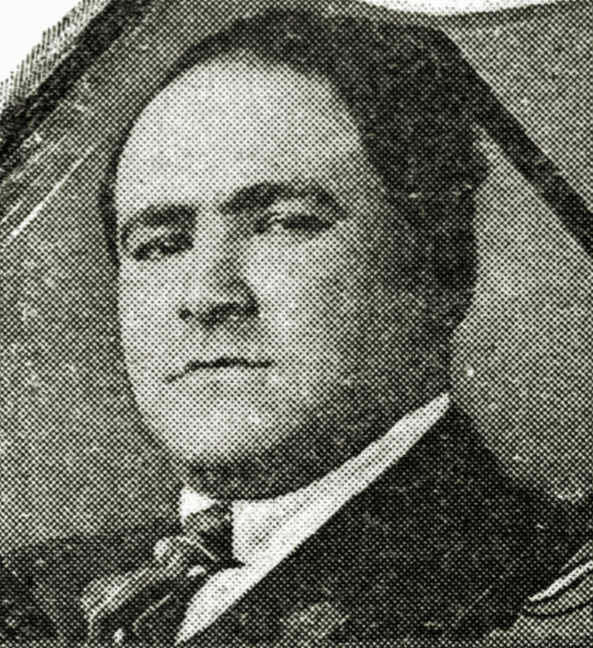

1st Mayor of Anchorage, Alaska
- In office November 26, 1920 – April 11, 1923
- Succeeded by: M. Joseph Conroy

Personal details
- Born: 1878 Brooklyn, New York
- Died: November 21, 1924 (aged 45–46)

Leopold David (1878 – November 21, 1924) was the first mayor of Anchorage, Alaska. He studied the law in his own time and was admitted to the Washington State Bar Association before moving in 1917 to what would become Anchorage, Alaska. He served two terms as major of Anchorage and was a practicing attorney before joining the Board of Regents of the University of Alaska.

== Biography ==
Leopold David was born in Brooklyn, New York in 1878 (or Nordhausen, Germany in 1881). He served in the Philippines in the Spanish–American War, achieving the rank of Sergeant First Class. In 1904, he was assigned to Fort Egbert on the Yukon River near Eagle, Alaska, where he worked as a pharmacist's assistant. Discharged in 1905, he moved to Seward, obtaining a position as manager of the Seward Drug Company. Local newspapers ads described him as a "Physician and Surgeon".

In 1909, David moved to Susitna Station to serve as a United States Marshal. The next year, he moved to Knik, where he was appointed a U.S. Commissioner. He served as an ex-officio probate judge, studying law on his own time and gaining admission into the Washington State Bar Association.

In 1915, David moved with his family to the tent city at Ship Creek. When the land for the future city of Anchorage was auctioned off, he acquired two lots. In 1917, he designed and built a house on Second Avenue, which stands to this day.

Anchorage was legally incorporated on November 23, 1920. On November 29, the newly elected city council designated David as the first mayor of Anchorage. In 1921, he joined Seward attorney L.V Ray in private law practice. David ran the firm's Anchorage office. After a second term as mayor, he joined the Board of Regents of the University of Alaska.

David died on November 21, 1924, of heart failure. He was survived by his wife Anna and children Caroline and Leopold Jr, and buried in Anchorage Memorial Park.

The Leopold David House was placed on the National Register of Historic Places in 1986.

Political offices
New title	Mayor of Anchorage; 1920–1923	Succeeded by M. Joseph Conroy
