= Z. J. Loussac =

American politician

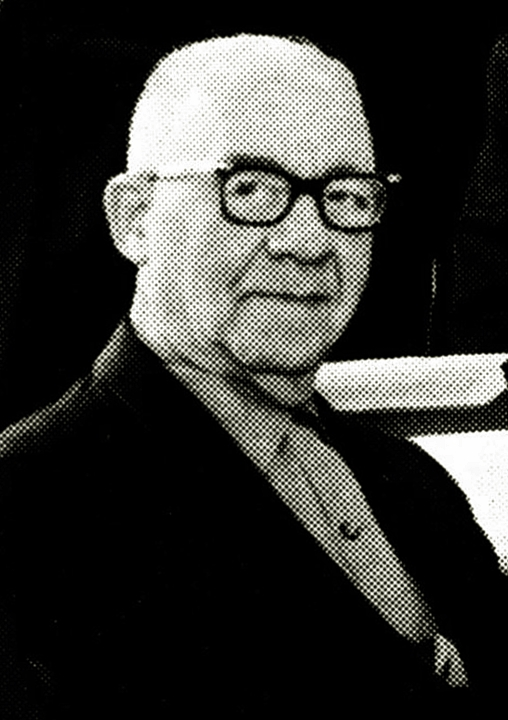
- Loussac in 1964

19th Mayor of Anchorage
- In office April 12, 1948 – October 8, 1951
- Preceded by: Francis C. Bowden
- Succeeded by: Maynard L. Taylor Jr.

Personal details
- Born: Zadrich Loussac; July 13, 1882 Pokrov, Vladimir Oblast, Russian Empire
- Died: March 15, 1965 (aged 82) Seattle, Washington, U.S.
- Party: Democratic

Zachary Joshua "Zac" Loussac (born Zadrich Loussac; July 13, 1882 – March 15, 1965) was Mayor of Anchorage from 1948 to 1951.

== Biography ==
Loussac was a Jew born in Pokrov, Vladimir Oblast, Russia in 1882. As an engineering student, he came under scrutiny for an interest in "some of the more liberal literature of the time."

In 1907, Loussac fled Tsarist Russia for Alaska, living in Nome, Unalakleet, Iditarod and Juneau before settling down in Anchorage in 1916 to open a drugstore at Fourth Avenue and E Street. He sold out of the drugstore business in 1942, and turned his efforts to philanthropy.

In 1946, with the aid of Elmer E. Rasmuson, Loussac created and endowed the Loussac Foundation, "dedicated to the promotion of recreational, cultural, scientific or educational activities in the Anchorage area." The next year, Loussac was elected to the first of two consecutive terms as Mayor of Anchorage. In 1949, at the age 66, he married Ada Harper. It was his only marriage.

In 1951, the Loussac Foundation underwrote the construction of a new, modern building to house the library at Fifth Avenue and F Street, replacing the older, cramped facilities at Fifth and E Street.

In 1952, Loussac served as an Alaska Territory Delegate to the Democratic National Convention. Over time, he also served as President of the Anchorage Chamber of Commerce, the Rotary Club and the Pioneers of Alaska.

The new library, which became known as the Loussac Library, opened its doors in 1955, by which time, Loussac had retired to Seattle. The library building was also home to the Cook Inlet Historical Society Museum, which later became the Anchorage Museum of History and Art.

On July 13, 1962, Loussac joined the municipally sponsored "Loussac Day" celebration to commemorate his 80th birthday. He died in Seattle on March 15, 1965. His ashes are interred in Angelus Memorial Park in Anchorage.

The first Loussac library was demolished in 1981 to make way for the William A. Egan Civic and Convention Center. In 1986, Anchorage opened a new four-story public library in midtown which was named the Z.J. Loussac Public Library.

== Name ==
Loussac was known by several names throughout his life. He was born Zadrich Loussac, but used the name Zachar Luzak after moving to the United States. He went by Zachary Loussac in Anchorage, and that became his legal name upon his naturalization in 1945. He was known as Z. J. Loussac in formal contexts, and as Zac to his friends. Some sources also refer to him as Zachariah.

== Bibliography ==
- Levi, Steven C. Zachery Joshua Loussac (2001)

Preceded by Francis C. Bowden	Mayor of Anchorage; 1948–1951	Succeeded by Maynard L. Taylor Jr.
