= House of David (disambiguation) =

The House of David was a dynasty that ruled the Kingdom of Israel and the Kingdom of Judah.

House of David may refer to:

- House of David (album), a 1967 album by David Newman
- House of David (commune), a religious group in Benton Harbor, Michigan
- House of David (TV series), an American television series
- House of David, an American basketball team owned by Dempsey Hovland
- House of David, an American recording studio owned by David Briggs
- House of David, a 2015 album by Lea DeLaria
- Cuban House of David, an American baseball team

== See also ==
- David (disambiguation)
- House (disambiguation)
