= Ken Hinchey =

American entrepreneur and politician

Mayor of Anchorage
- In office April 8, 1955 – April 8, 1956
- Preceded by: Maynard L. Taylor, Jr.
- Succeeded by: Anton Anderson

Personal details
- Born: September 9, 1912 Tacoma, Washington, U.S.
- Died: April 21, 1994 (age 81) Anchorage, Alaska, U.S.

Ken Hinchey (September 9, 1912 – April 21, 1994) was an American entrepreneur and politician who served one term as Mayor of Anchorage, Alaska from 1955 to 1956.

== Early life ==
Ken Hinchey was born September 9, 1912, in Fern Hill, Tacoma, Washington. He attended high-school in Seattle and would work in eastern Oregon as a self-employed rancher. He married an Oregon native, Nadine Graves, but sold all his belongings to move to Alaska in 1937. Hinchey said that he moved to Alaska because he had an uncle who had moved there in 1902 to prospect during the Nome Gold Rush.

== Career ==
When Hinchey first arrived in Anchorage he supported his wife who started a little hamburger business which he claimed was the first hamburger spot in Alaska. In order to cover the restaurants costs Hinchey started to enter the construction materials trade before focusing on sand, gravel, and concrete. His wife would ultimately close her burger joint to become his Vice-President.

Hinchey began to sell sand and gravel in Government Hill and ice from Spenard Lake; he later founded the Ken Hinchey Co. construction company. In 1952, the company supplied gravel to the Palmer Construction Company while it was creating the six and a half mile tunnel for the Eklutna Power Plant. Hinchey had founded the Alaska Aggregate Corporation, also known as Alagco, in 1948.

Hinchey started a number of businesses in Alaska, including Northern Transfer, the Black and White Restaurant, Idealaska Cement, and Pacific Western Lines, and "salmon airlift service" for commercial fishermen in the 1970s. He also mined gold in Hope, invented machines, and transported oil from Valdez to Fairbanks for the military during World War II. He was an avid bush pilot.

== Political career ==
Hinchey was elected to a single term mayor of Anchorage in 1955. During his seven months in office, he advocated statehood for the Territory of Alaska and building a dam on the Cook Inlet causeway. He resigned in 1956 after he was prohibited by the city council from using his businesses to supply municipal projects.

He briefly ran for governor of Alaska in 1969. He ran for mayor again in 1973. In 1974, he sold Alagco to the Alaska Brick Company.

== Personal life ==
In 1933, he married Nadine Graves, and the couple moved to Anchorage, Alaska in 1937. He died April 21, 1994, at the age of 81. At the time of his death, he had three children.

== Bibliography ==
- Hinchey, Ken Alaskan "Imagineer", 1994

Preceded by Maynard L. Taylor Jr.	Mayor of Anchorage; 1955 – 1956	Succeeded by Anton Anderson
