= List of United States Senate elections in Alaska =

United States Senate elections in Alaska occur when voters in the U.S. state of Alaska select an individual to represent the state in the United States Senate in either of the state's two seats allotted by the Constitution. Regularly scheduled general elections occur on Election Day, coinciding with various other federal, statewide, and local races.

Each state is allotted two U.S. Senators elected to staggered six-year terms, which were originally selected by the state legislature. The Senate is divided into three classes to stagger the terms of its members such that one-third of the Senate would be up for re-election every two years. Upon Alaska's admission to the Union in 1959, the state was assigned a Class 2 seat and a Class 3 seat, first elected in 1958. Since the passage of the Seventeenth Amendment in 1913, U.S. Senators are elected directly by the voters of each state. Special elections may be held to fill mid-term vacancies to elect an individual to serve the remainder of the unexpired term.

The list below contains results from all U.S. Senate elections held in Alaska, sorted by year. The next scheduled election for the Class 2 seat is in 2026, while the Class 3 seat will hold its next election in 2028.

== List of recent elections ==
=== Class 2 ===
Year	Winner				Runner-up				Others		Ref
Year	Candidate	Party	Votes	%	Candidate	Party	Votes	%	Votes	%	Ref
1958	Bob Bartlett	Democratic	40,939	83.83%	R. E. Robertson	Republican	7,299	14.95%	599	1.23%	
1960	Bob Bartlett*	Democratic	38,041	63.42%	Lee McKinley	Republican	21,937	36.58%			
1966	Bob Bartlett*	Democratic	49,289	75.54%	Lee McKinley	Republican	15,961	24.46%			
1970 (sp)	Ted Stevens*	Republican	47,908	59.61%	Wendell P. Kay	Democratic	32,456	40.39%			
1972	Ted Stevens*	Republican	74,216	77.30%	Gene Guess	Democratic	21,791	22.70%			
1978	Ted Stevens*	Republican	92,783	75.59%	Donald Hobbs	Democratic	29,574	24.09%	384	0.31%	
1984	Ted Stevens*	Republican	146,919	71.17%	John Havelock	Democratic	58,804	28.49%	715	0.35%	
1990	Ted Stevens*	Republican	125,806	66.23%	Michael Beasley	Democratic	61,152	32.19%	2,999	1.58%	
1996	Ted Stevens*	Republican	177,893	76.70%	Jed Whittaker	Green	29,037	12.52%	1,009	0.44%	
1996	Ted Stevens*	Republican	177,893	76.70%	Theresa Obermeyer	Democratic	23,977	10.34%	1,009	0.44%	
2002	Ted Stevens*	Republican	179,438	78.17%	Frank Vondersaar	Democratic	24,133	10.51%	9,369	4.08%	
2002	Ted Stevens*	Republican	179,438	78.17%	Jim Sykes	Green	16,608	7.24%	9,369	4.08%	
2008	Mark Begich	Democratic	151,767	47.77%	Ted Stevens*	Republican	147,814	46.52%	18,142	5.71%	
2014	Dan Sullivan	Republican	135,445	47.96%	Mark Begich*	Democratic	129,431	45.83%	17,524	6.21%	
2020	Dan Sullivan*	Republican	191,112	53.90%	Al Gross	Independent (Note: Nominated by the Democratic Party.)	146,068	41.19%	17,407	4.91%	

Borough and census area results of Class 2 elections since 2008

2008
Begich vs. Stevens

2014
Sullivan vs. Begich

2020
Sullivan vs. Gross

=== Class 3 ===
Year	Winner				Runner(s)-up				Others		Ref
Year	Candidate	Party	Votes	%	Candidate	Party	Votes	%	Votes	%	Ref
1958	Ernest Gruening	Democratic	26,045	52.61%	Mike Stepovich	Republican	23,464	47.39%			
1962	Ernest Gruening*	Democratic	33,827	58.14%	Ted Stevens	Republican	24,354	41.86%			
1968	Mike Gravel	Democratic	36,527	45.13%	Elmer E. Rasmuson	Republican	30,286	37.42%			
1968	Mike Gravel	Democratic	36,527	45.13%	Ernest Gruening*	Write-in	14,118	17.44%			
1974	Mike Gravel*	Democratic	54,361	58.28%	C. R. Lewis	Republican	38,914	41.72%			
1980	Frank Murkowski	Republican	84,159	53.69%	Clark Gruening	Democratic	72,007	45.93%	596	0.38%	
1986	Frank Murkowski*	Republican	97,674	54.02%	Glenn Olds	Democratic	79,727	44.10%	3,400	1.88%	
1992	Frank Murkowski*	Republican	127,163	53.05%	Tony Smith	Democratic	92,065	38.41%	467	0.19%	
1992	Frank Murkowski*	Republican	127,163	53.05%	Mary Jordan	Green	20,019	8.35%	467	0.19%	
1998	Frank Murkowski*	Republican	165,227	74.49%	Joseph Sonneman	Democratic	43,743	19.72%	12,837	5.79%	
2004	Lisa Murkowski*	Republican	149,773	48.58%	Tony Knowles	Democratic	140,424	45.55%	18,118	5.88%	
2010	Lisa Murkowski*	Write-in	92,931	36.08%	Joe Miller	Republican	90,839	35.27%	13,723	5.33%	
2010	Lisa Murkowski*	Write-in	92,931	36.08%	Scott McAdams	Democratic	60,045	23.32%	13,723	5.33%	
2016	Lisa Murkowski*	Republican	138,149	44.36%	Joe Miller	Libertarian	90,825	29.16%	5,073	1.63%	
2016	Lisa Murkowski*	Republican	138,149	44.36%	Margaret Stock	Independent	41,194	13.23%	5,073	1.63%	
2016	Lisa Murkowski*	Republican	138,149	44.36%	Ray Metcalfe	Democratic	36,200	11.62%	5,073	1.63%	
2022 (Note: Election held using instant-runoff voting; results from the maximum round are shown.)	Lisa Murkowski*	Republican	136,330	53.70%	Kelly Tshibaka	Republican	117,534	46.30%			

Borough and census area results of Class 3 elections since 2004

2004
Murkowski vs. Knowles

2010
Murkowski vs. Miller & McAdams

2016
Murkowski vs. Miller, Stock, & Metcalfe

2022
Murkowski vs. Tshibaka

== See also ==
- List of United States senators from Alaska
- List of United States presidential elections in Alaska
- Elections in Alaska
