= Electoral history of Ted Stevens =

List of elections featuring Ted Stevens as a candidate

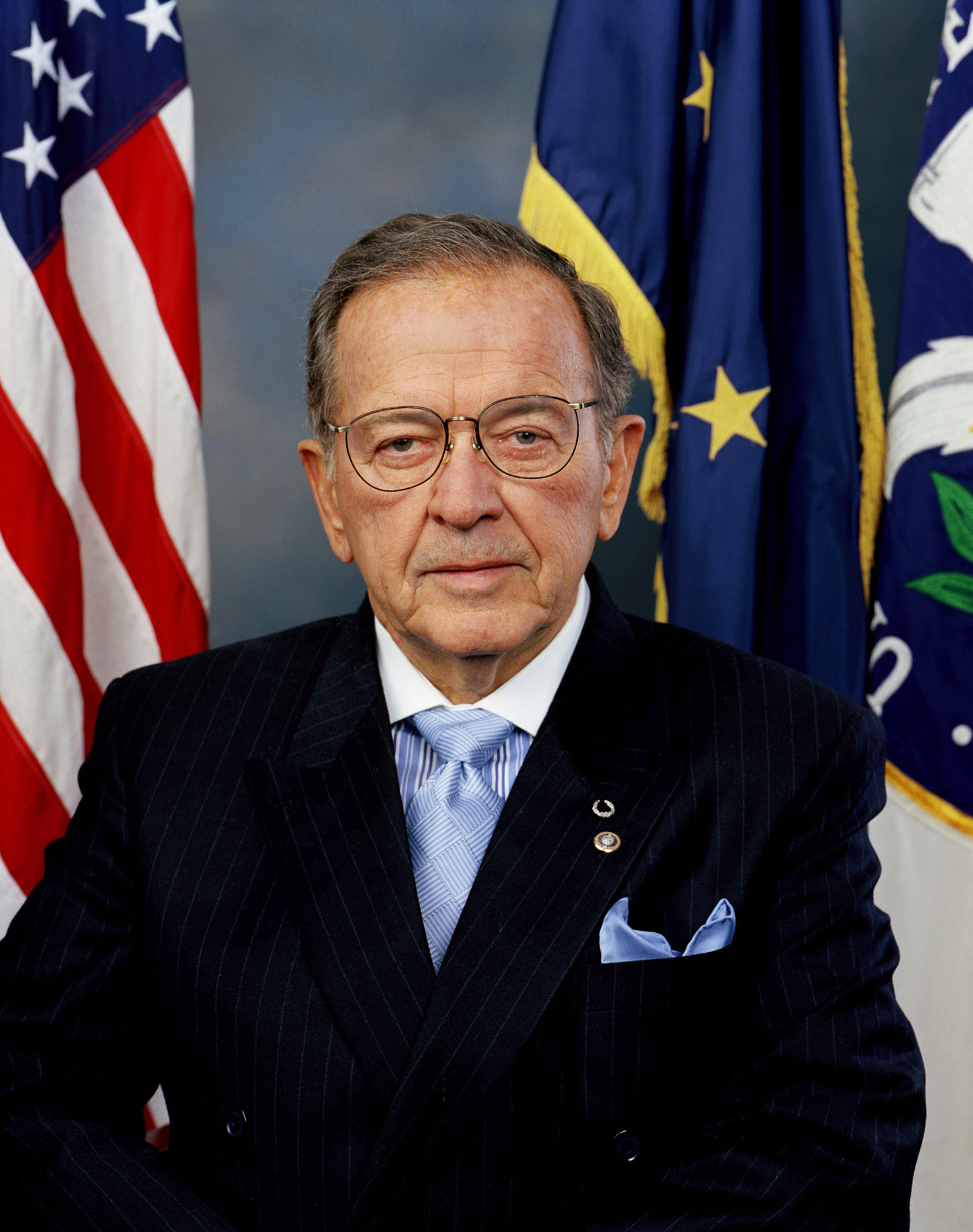
Senator Ted Stevens (R-AK)

Electoral history of Ted Stevens, United States Senator from Alaska (1968–2009), Senate Minority Whip (1977–1981), Acting Senate Minority Leader (1979–1980), Senate Majority Whip (1981–1985), President pro tempore of the United States Senate (2003–2007) and President pro tempore emeritus (2007–2009)

At time of his 2008 defeat, Stevens was the 4th longest-serving Senator as well as most senior Republican in this body.

== Early Senate and state legislature races (1962–1968) ==
=== Republican primary for the United States Senate from Alaska, 1962 ===
- Ted Stevens – 11,000 (72.49%)
- Frank Cook – 4,175 (27.51%)

=== United States Senate election in Alaska, 1962 ===
- Ernest Gruening (D) (inc.) – 33,827 (58.14%)
- Ted Stevens (R) – 24,354 (41.86%)

=== Alaska House of Representatives, 8th district, 1964 ===
Elected:

- Mike Gravel (D) (inc.)
- Earl D. Hillstrand (D) (inc.)
- Joe Josephson (D) (inc.)
- Bruce Biers Kendall (R) (inc.)
- Carl F. Lottsfeldt (D) (inc.)
- Homer Moseley (D) (inc.)
- John L. Rader (D) (inc.)
- Harold D. Strandberg (R) (inc.)
- Carl F. Brady (R)
- Bernard J. Carr, Sr. (D)
- Gene Guess (D)
- M. D. Plotnick (D)
- Charles J. Sassara, Jr. (D)
- Ted Stevens (R)

=== Alaska House of Representatives, 8th district, 1966 ===
Elected:

- Gene Guess (D) (inc.)
- William J. Moran (D) (inc.)
- Charles J. Sassara, Jr. (D) (inc.)
- Ted Stevens (R) (inc.)
- Harold D. Strandberg (R) (inc.)
- Michael F. Beirne (R)
- Ken Brady (R)
- Tom Fink (R)
- Milo Fritz (R)
- Jess Harris (R)
- M. M. Moore (R)
- Jack R. Simpson (R)
- Don Smith (R)
- William C. Wiggins (R)

=== Republican primary for the United States Senate from Alaska, 1968 ===
- Elmer E. Rasmuson – 10,320 (53.11%)
- Ted Stevens – 9,111 (46.89%)

== U.S. Senate races as an incumbent (1970–2008) ==
=== Open special primary for the United States Senate from Alaska, 1970 ===
- Ted Stevens (R) (inc.) – 39,062 (55.91%)
- Wendell P. Kay (D) – 16,729 (23.94%)
- Joe Josephson (D) – 12,730 (18.22%)
- Fritz Singer (R) – 1,349 (1.93%)

Note: Stevens was appointed for the United States Senate following death of incumbent Bob Bartlett in December 1968

=== United States Senate special election in Alaska, 1970 ===
- Ted Stevens (R) (inc.) – 47,908 (59.61%)
- Wendell P. Kay (D) – 32,456 (40.39%)

=== United States Senate election in Alaska, 1972 ===
- Ted Stevens (R) (inc.) – 74,216 (77.30%)
- Gene Guess (D) – 21,791 (22.70%)

=== United States Senate election in Alaska, 1978 ===
- Ted Stevens (R) (inc.) – 92,783 (75.59%)
- Donald W. Cobbs (D) – 29,574 (24.10%)
- Write-in – 384 (0.31%)

=== All-Party primary for the United States Senate from Alaska, 1984 ===
- Ted Stevens (R) (inc.) – 65,522 (69.23%)
- John E. Havelock (D) – 19,074 (20.15%)
- Dave Carlson (D) – 4,620 (4.88%)
- Michael Beasley (D) – 2,443 (2.58%)
- Joe Tracanna (D) – 1,661 (1.76%)
- Phil Stoddard (D) – 1,331 (1.41%)

=== United States Senate election in Alaska, 1984 ===
- Ted Stevens (R) (inc.) – 146,919 (71.17%)
- John E. Havelock (D) – 58,804 (28.49%)
- Write-in – 715 (0.35%)

=== Senate Majority Leader, 1984 ===
Fourth ballot:

- Bob Dole – 28
- Ted Stevens – 25

=== All-Party primary for the United States Senate from Alaska, 1990 ===
- Ted Stevens (R) (inc.) – 81,968 (59.19%)
- Michael Beasley (D) – 12,371 (8.93%)
- Robert M. Bird (R) – 34,824 (25.15%)
- Tom Taggart – 9,329 (6.74%)

=== United States Senate election in Alaska, 1990 ===
- Ted Stevens (R) (inc.) – 125,806 (66.23%)
- Michael Beasley (D) – 61,152 (32.19%)
- Write-in – 2,999 (1.58%)

=== All-Party primary for the United States Senate from Alaska, 1996 ===
- Ted Stevens (R) (inc.) – 71,043 (58.87%)
- Theresa Obermeyer (D) – 4,072 (3.37%)
- Jed Whittaker (Green) – 3,751 (3.11%)
- Dave W. Cuddy (R) – 32,994 (27.34%)
- Joseph A. Sonneman (D) – 2,643 (2.19%)
- Michael Beasley (D) – 1,968 (1.63%)
- Henry J. Blake, Jr. (D) – 1,157 (0.96%)
- Lawrence Freiberger (D) – 921 (0.76%)
- Charles E. McKee (R) – 842 (0.70%)
- Frank J. Vondersaar (D) – 655 (0.54%)
- Robert Alan Gigler (D) – 631 (0.52%)

=== United States Senate election in Alaska, 1996 ===
- Ted Stevens (R) (inc.) – 177,893 (76.71%)
- Jed Whittaker (Green) – 29,037 (12.52%)
- Theresa Obermeyer (D) – 23,977 (10.34%)
- Write-in – 1,009 (0.44%)

=== Republican primary for the United States Senate from Alaska, 2002 ===
- Ted Stevens (inc.) – 64,315 (88.94%)
- Mike Aubrey – 7,997 (11.06%)

=== United States Senate election in Alaska, 2002 ===
- Ted Stevens (R) (inc.) – 179,438 (78.17%)
- Frank J. Vondersaar (D) – 24,133 (10.51%)
- Jim Sykes (Green) – 16,608 (7.24%)
- Jim Dore (Alaskan Independence) – 6,724 (2.93%)
- Len Karpinski (LBT) – 2,354 (1.03%)
- Write-in – 291 (0.13%)

=== Republican primary for the United States Senate from Alaska, 2008 ===
- Ted Stevens (inc.) – 59,138 (63.53%)
- Dave W. Cuddy – 25,387 (27.27%)
- Vic Vickers – 5,204 (5.59%)
- Michael D. Corey – 1,283 (1.38%)
- Rick Sikma – 949 (1.02%)
- Rich M. Wanda – 621 (0.67%)
- Gerald L. Heikes – 500 (0.54%)

=== United States Senate election in Alaska, 2008 ===
- Mark Begich (D) 47.76%
- Ted Stevens (R) (incumbent) 46.5%
- Bob Bird (AIP) 4.16%
- Fredrick David Haase (L) 0.79%
