= 2004 United States Senate election in Alaska =

- November 2, 2004
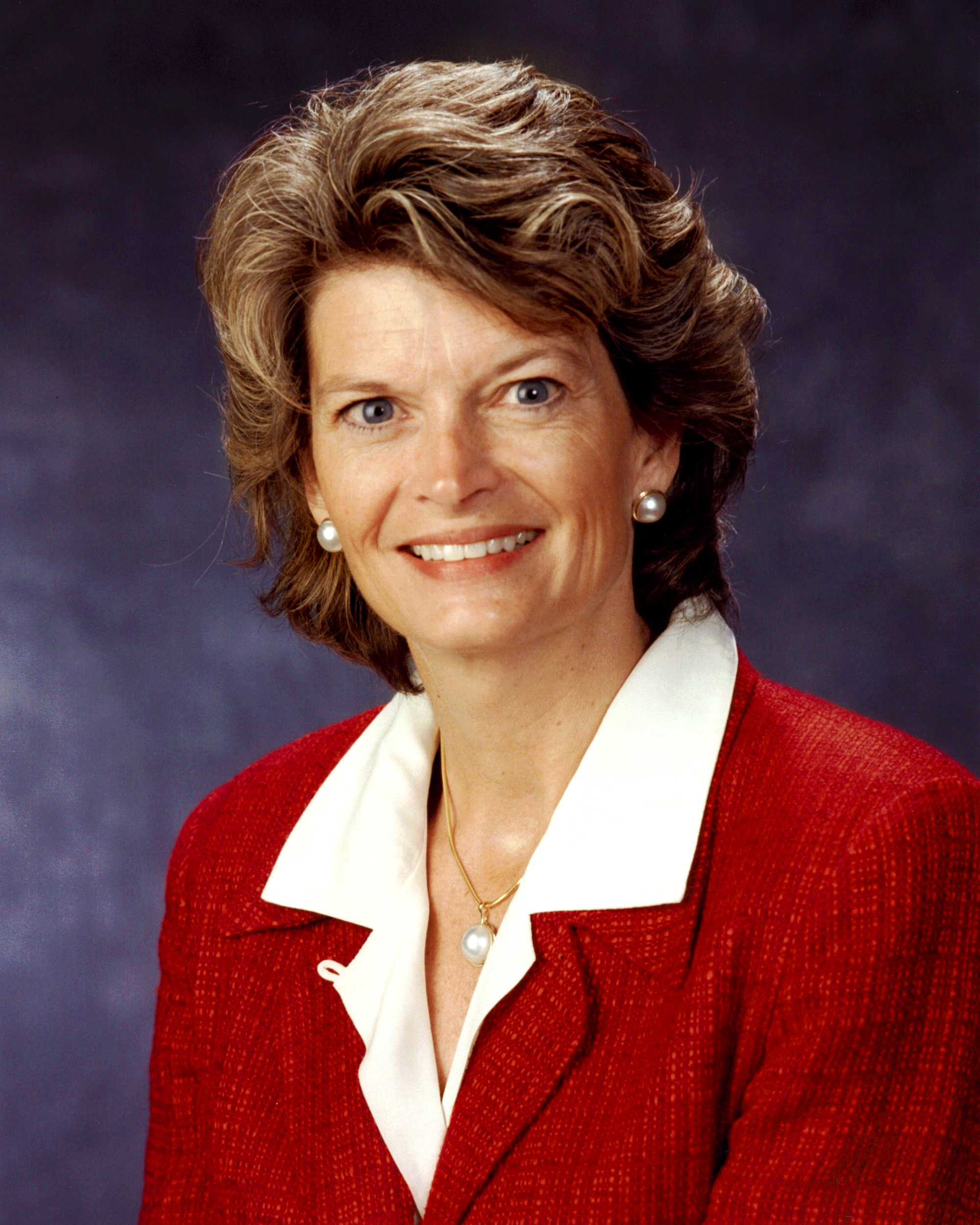

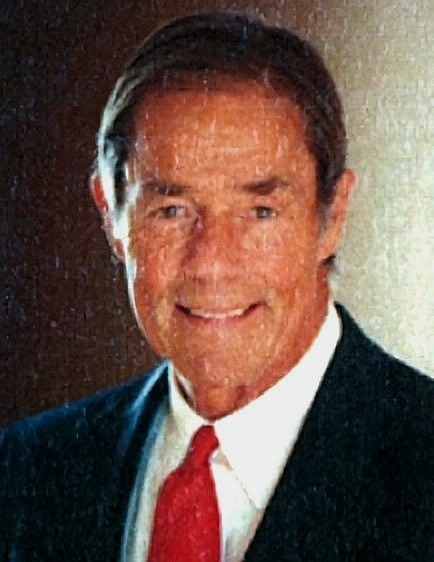
Nominee	Lisa Murkowski	Tony Knowles
Party	Republican	Democratic
Popular vote	149,773	140,424
Percentage	48.58%	45.55%
- Results by borough and census area Murkowski: 40–50% 50–60% 60–70% 70–80% Knowles: 40–50% 50–60% 60–70% 70–80%
U.S. senator before election
Lisa Murkowski (Note: In December 2002, Murkowski was appointed by Governor Frank Murkowski (her father) to fill the vacancy caused by Frank Murkowski himself resigning after being sworn in as Governor of Alaska.)
Republican
Elected U.S. Senator
Lisa Murkowski
Republican

The 2004 United States Senate election in Alaska was held on Tuesday November 2, Republican candidate and Interim United States senator Lisa Murkowski won election to her first full term in office by defeating former governor of Alaska Tony Knowles. Murkowski had been appointed in 2002 by Frank Murkowski, her father and the governor of Alaska.

At the time, this was the closest United States Senate election in Alaska history; it has since been surpassed in 2008, 2010 and 2014. The younger Murkowski was the first woman elected to the United States Congress from Alaska. As of 2026, Murkowski’s total vote of 149,773 remains the most she has received in her four campaigns for United States Senate.

Despite the resignation of the elder Murkowski, this was not a special election. Alaska was the only state that had vacancy in Senate election already regularly scheduled for 2004.

== Background ==
On November 5, 2002, U.S. senator Frank Murkowski ran for election as governor of Alaska and won, resigning from the United States Senate to take office as governor on December 2. On December 20, Murkowski appointed his daughter Lisa, a Republican member of the Alaska House of Representatives from Anchorage, to his former seat for the remainder of his unexpired term. Murkowski passed over other potential appointees, including retiring Wasilla mayor Sarah Palin and state senator Ben Stevens, who was the son of the state's popular senior senator, Ted Stevens.

== Republican primary ==
=== Candidates ===
- Jim Dore, aviation mechanic
- Mike W. Miller, businessman, former state senator, former state representative, nominee for lieutenant governor in 1994 and younger brother of Terry Miller
- Lisa Murkowski, incumbent U.S. Senator since 2002, formerly an Anchorage lawyer and member of the Alaska House
- Wev Shea, former U.S. Attorney for Alaska

=== Results ===
Republican primary results
Party	Candidate	Votes	%
Republican	Lisa Murkowski (incumbent)	45,710	58.1%
Republican	Mike Miller	29,313	37.3%
Republican	Wev Shea	2,857	3.6%
Republican	Jim Dore	748	0.9%
Total votes		78,628	100.0%

== Democratic primary ==
=== Candidates ===
- Tony Knowles, businessman, former governor and former mayor of Anchorage
- Theresa Obermeyer, former Anchorage school board member and 1996 Democratic U.S. Senate nominee
- Don Wright, former president of the Alaska Federation of Natives and perennial candidate

=== Results ===
Democratic primary results
Party	Candidate	Votes	%
Democratic	Tony Knowles	40,881	95.0%
Democratic	Don Wright	1,080	2.5%
Democratic	Theresa Obermeyer	1,045	2.4%
Total votes		43,006	100.0%

== General election ==
=== Candidates ===
- Ted Gianoutsos, lobbyist and activist on ANWR and veterans issues (Independent)
- Scott Kohlhaas, party activist and perennial candidate (Libertarian)
- Tony Knowles, former governor of Alaska (Democratic)
- Marc Millican, aviator and U.S. Air Force veteran (Independent)
- Lisa Murkowski, interim U.S. senator since 2002 (Republican)
- Jerry Sanders, businessman, former state representative (American Independent)
- Jim Sykes, party activist and perennial candidate (Green)

=== Campaign ===
By 2004, popular opinion had swung against the Murkowski family because of a state tax increase passed by Frank. Lisa Murkowski had very low approval ratings and faced accusations that she owed her seat to nepotism. Knowles enlisted extensive out-of-state support in his bid for the seat and ran on his support for drilling in ANWR, in contrast to his national party.

Murkowski received crucial support from Ted Stevens, who worked to rescue her campaign and taped advertisements warning Alaskans that electing a Democrat could result in fewer federal dollars for Alaska.

=== Debates ===
- Complete video of debate, October 26, 2004
- Complete video of debate, October 28, 2004

=== Predictions ===
Source	Ranking	As of
Sabato's Crystal Ball	Lean D (flip)	November 1, 2004

=== Polling ===
Poll source	Dates administered	Murkowski (R)	Knowles (D)
KTUU	October 4, 2004	45%	48%
KTUU	October 18, 2004	45%	47%
McLaughlin	October 28, 2004	48%	43%

=== Results ===
2004 United States Senate election in Alaska
Party	Candidate	Votes	%	±%
Republican	Lisa Murkowski (incumbent)	149,773	48.58%	−25.91%
Democratic	Tony Knowles	140,424	45.55%	+25.82%
Independent	Marc J. Millican	8,885	2.88%	
Independence	Jerry Sanders	3,785	1.23%	
Green	Jim Sykes	3,053	0.99%	−2.22%
Libertarian	Scott A. Kohlhaas	1,240	0.40%	−1.87%
Independent	Ted Gianoutsas	732	0.24%	
Write-ins		423	0.14%	
Majority		9,349	3.03%	−51.74%
Turnout		308,315		
Republican hold		Swing		

==== Boroughs and census areas that flipped from Republican to Democratic ====
- Aleutians West Census Area (largest city: Unalaska)
- Bethel Census Area (largest city: Bethel)
- Kusilvak Census Area (largest city: Hooper Bay)
- Nome Census Area (largest city: Nome)
- Dilingham Census Area (largest city: Dilingham)
- Lake & Peninsula Borough (largest city: Newhalen)
- North Slope Borough (largest city: Utqiaġvik)
- Northwest Arctic Borough (largest city: Kotzebue)
- Prince of Wales–Hyder Census Area (largest city: Craig)
- Yukon–Koyukuk Census Area (largest city: Fort Yukon)
- Juneau
- Sitka
- Hoonah–Angoon Census Area (largest town: Hoonah)
- Yakutat
- Petersburg
- Skagway
- Ketchikan Gateway Borough (largest city: Ketchikan)
- Bristol Bay Borough (largest city: Naknek)

== See also ==
- 2004 United States Senate elections
