= 1984 United States Senate election in Alaska =

- November 6, 1984
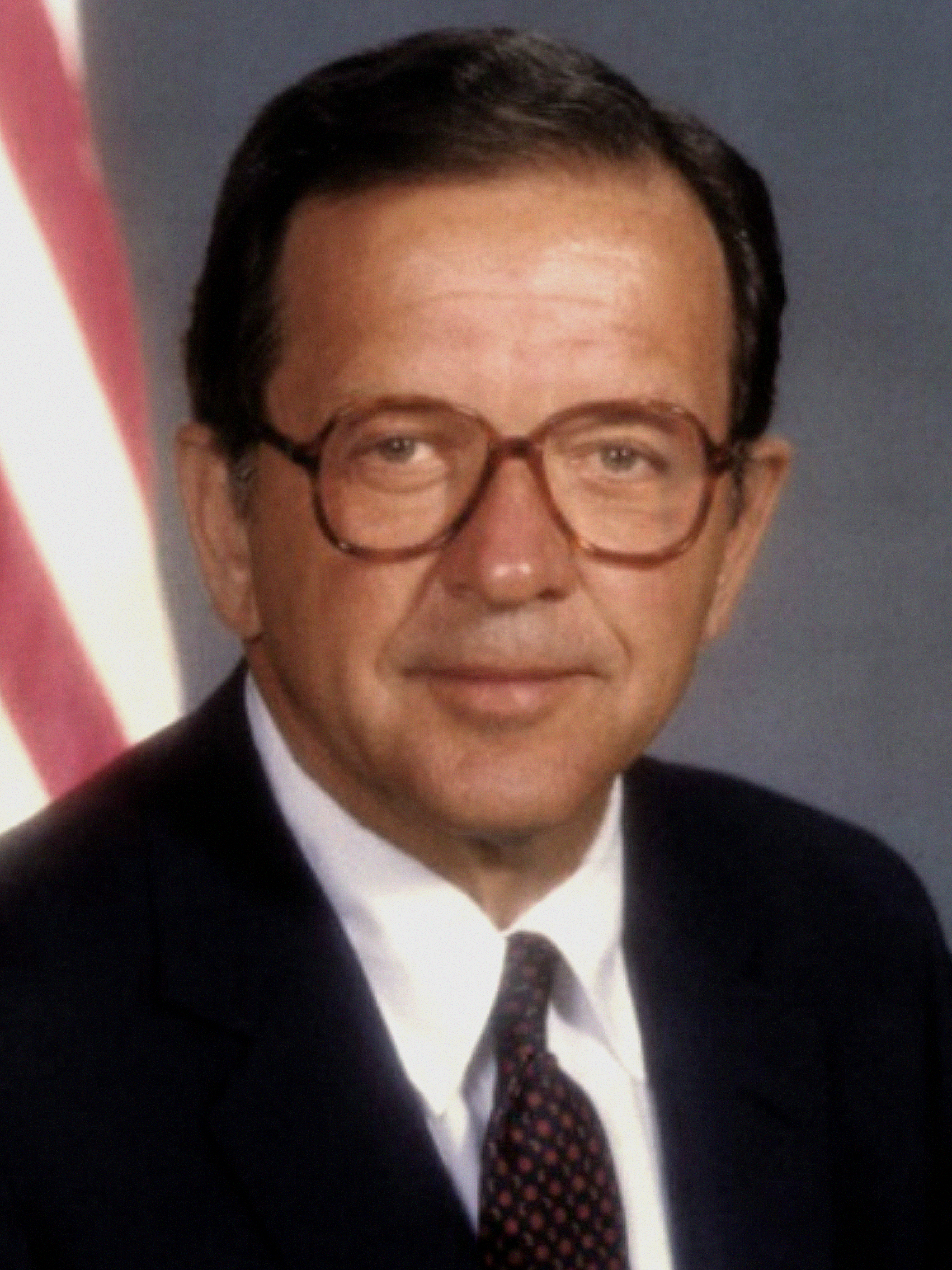

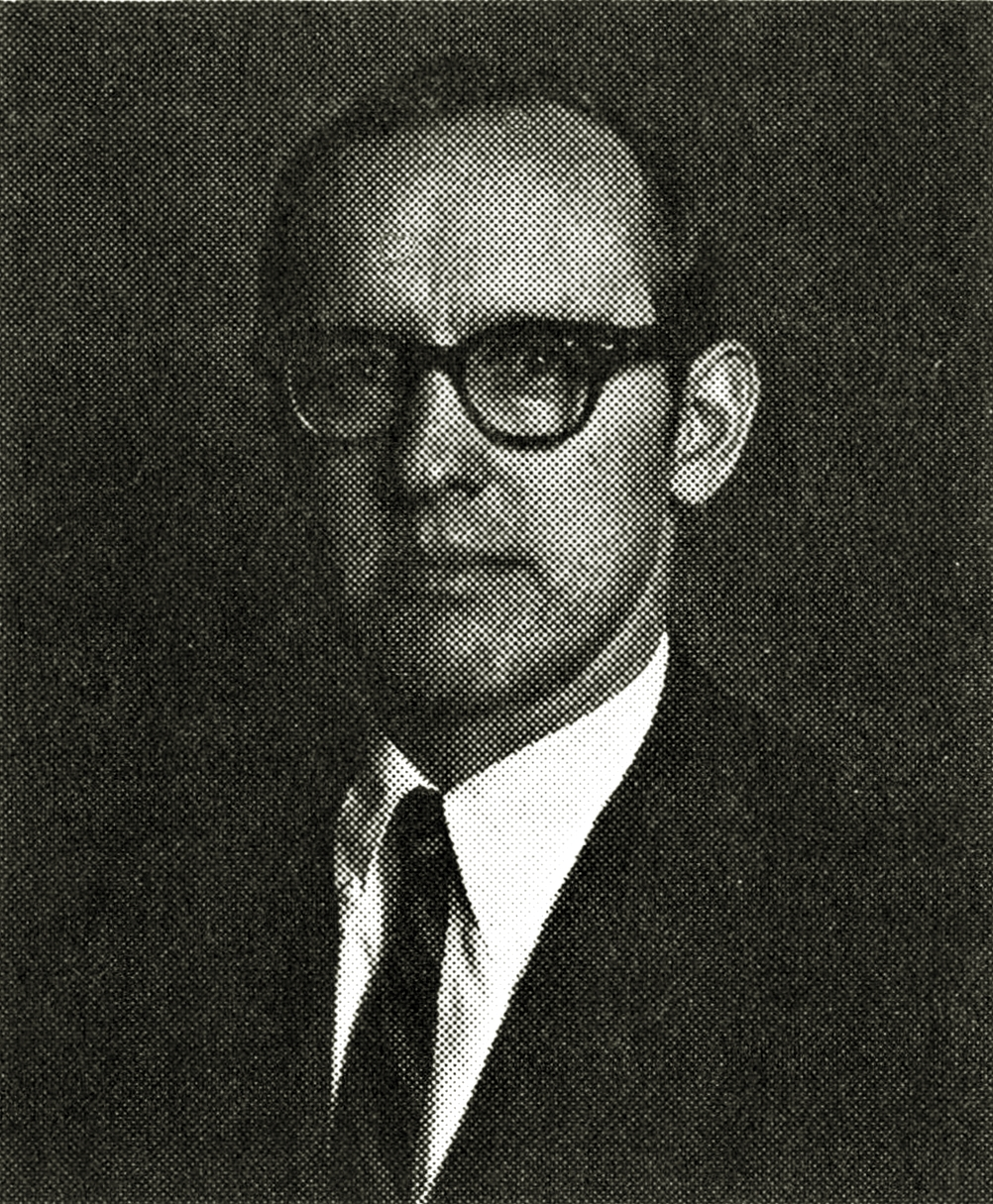
Nominee	Ted Stevens	John Havelock
Party	Republican	Democratic
Popular vote	146,919	58,804
Percentage	71.17%	28.49%
- Results by state house district Stevens: 60–70% 70–80% 80–90%
U.S. senator before election
Ted Stevens
Republican
Elected U.S. Senator
Ted Stevens
Republican

The 1984 United States Senate election in Alaska was held on November 6, 1984. Incumbent Republican Senator Ted Stevens sought re-election to a fourth term (a third full term) in the United States Senate. Owing to his popularity and the conservative bent of Alaska, Stevens did not face major opposition, and easily defeated former Alaska Attorney General John Havelock in the general election.

== Open primary ==
=== Candidates ===
==== Democratic ====
- Michael Beasley, perennial candidate
- Dave Carlson, former congressional candidate
- John Havelock, former attorney general of Alaska
- Phil Stoddard
- Joe Tracanna

==== Republican ====
- Ted Stevens, incumbent senator since 1968

=== Results ===
Open primary results
Party	Candidate	Votes	%
Republican	Ted Stevens (incumbent)	65,522	69.22%
Democratic	John Havelock	19,074	20.15%
Democratic	Dave Carlson	4,620	4.88%
Republican	Michael Beasley	2,443	2.58%
Democratic	Joe Tracanna	1,661	1.75%
Democratic	Phil Stoddard	1,331	1.41%
Total votes		94,651	100.00%

== General election ==
=== Results ===
1984 United States Senate election in Alaska
Party	Candidate	Votes	%	±%
Republican	Ted Stevens (incumbent)	146,919	71.17%	−4.42%
Democratic	John E. Havelock	58,804	28.49%	+4.39%
Write-in		715	0.35%	
Majority		88,115	42.68%	−8.81%
Turnout		206,438		
Republican hold		Swing		

== See also ==
- 1984 United States Senate elections
