= 1966 United States Senate election in Alaska =

- November 8, 1966
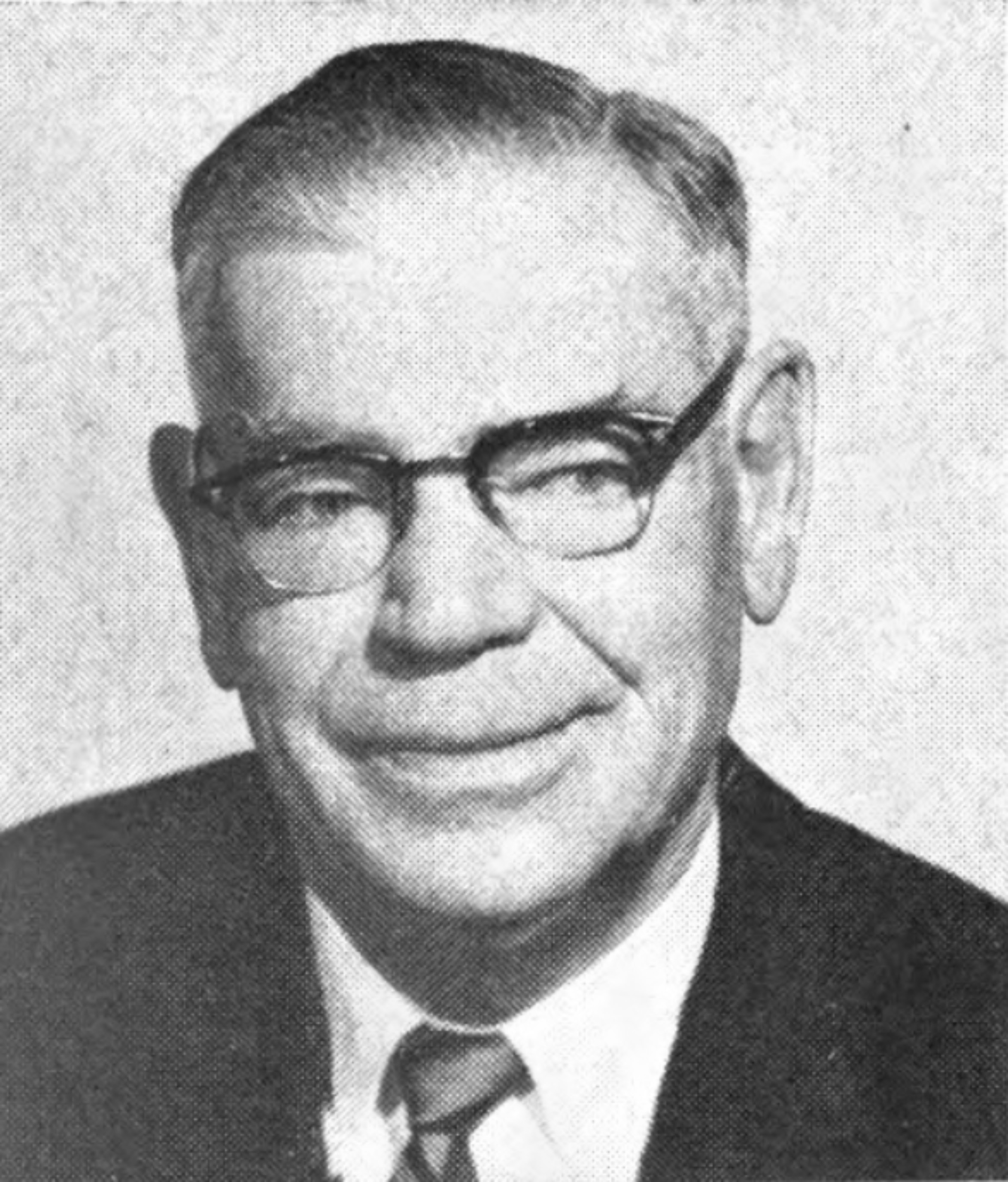

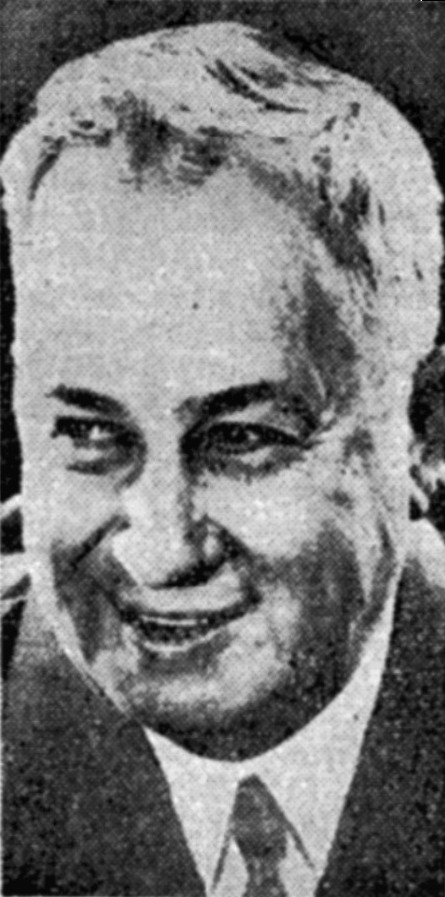
Nominee	Bob Bartlett	Lee McKinley
Party	Democratic	Republican
Popular vote	49,289	15,961
Percentage	75.54%	24.46%
- Bartlett: 60–70% 70–80% 80–90%
U.S. senator before election
Bob Bartlett
Democratic
Elected U.S. Senator
Bob Bartlett
Democratic

The 1966 United States Senate election in Alaska was held on November 8, 1966. Incumbent Democratic U.S. Senator Bob Bartlett was re-elected to a third term in office in a landslide, defeating Republican dentist Lee McKinley in a rematch of their 1960 race. Bartlett would not complete the term, dying in office on December 11, 1968, following complications after heart surgery. Ted Stevens would be elected to complete Bartlett's term, and would serve for 40 years in the U.S. Senate. This was the last time until 2008 that a Democrat was elected to Alaska's Class 2 Senate seat.

== Open primary ==
=== Candidates ===
==== Democratic ====
- Bob Bartlett, incumbent Senator
- T. J. Bichsel
- David Boyer, candidate for Governor of Alaska in 1962
- Robert L. Veach

==== Republican ====
- Lawrence M. Brayton, candidate for Senate in 1960
- Lee McKinley, dentist and Republican nominee for Senate in 1960
- Maxine B. Whaley

=== Results ===
1966 Senate primary
Party	Candidate	Votes	%
Democratic	Bob Bartlett (inc.)	27,994	57.40%
Republican	Lee McKinley	9,310	19.09%
Republican	Lawrence M. Brayton	5,492	11.26%
Republican	Maxine B. Whaley	8,662	3.83%
Democratic	T. J. Bichsel	1,864	3.82%
Democratic	Robert L. Veach	1,299	2.66%
Democratic	David Boyer	944	1.94%
Total votes		48,769	100.00%

== General election ==
=== Results ===
General election results
Party	Candidate	Votes	%	±%
Democratic	Bob Bartlett (inc.)	49,289	75.54%	▲12.12
Republican	Lee McKinley	15,961	24.46%	▼12.12
Total votes		65,250	100.00%	

== See also ==
- 1966 United States Senate elections
