= Alaskan Party =

Minor political party in Alaska

- Abbreviation: AP
- Founder: Bob Bird; Mark Chryson
- Founded: March 19, 2026; 7 months ago
- Preceded by: Alaskan Independence Party
- Registered voters (2026): ▲61
- Ideology: Alaskan nationalism Libertarian conservatism
- Slogan: Alaska First, Alaska Always
- Senate: 0 / 20
- House of Representatives: 0 / 40
- U.S. Senate: 0 / 2
- U.S. House of Representatives: 0 / 1

The Alaskan Party (AP) is an Alaskan nationalist political party in the United States. The Alaskan Party is intended to be a successor to the defunct Alaskan Independence Party (AIP), which dissolved in December 2025. Former AIP chair Bob Bird and vice chair Mark Chryson founded the Alaskan Party in March 2026.

== History ==
In December 2025, board members of the Alaskan Independence Party voted to dissolve itself, citing declining membership. Party chair John Wayne Howe claimed that the party drifted from its original purpose following the death of its founder, Joseph E. Vogler, in 1993. In the announcement of its dissolution, AIP officials called the party "legally alive yet spiritually dead". Howe also believed many members of the party registered as AIP members under the false assumption that they were registering as independents. Former chair Bob Bird opposed the dissolution, wanting a convention to reconstitute the party. Bird and former vice chair Mark Chryson met with Attorney General Stephen J. Cox and Lieutenant Governor Nancy Dahlstrom in March to postpone the dissolution, but were unsuccessful.

The Alaskan Party was registered with the Alaska Division of Elections in March 2026. The Alaska Division of Elections reported the Alaskan Party had 22 registered members as of May 2026, doubling to 44 members by September 2026. Per state law, the Alaskan Party is recognized by the state as a political group, with 5,000 members required in order to be recognized as an official political party.

One candidate ran for office under the Alaskan Party in 2026, former Unalaska City Council member Earl D. "Skip" Southworth, who ran for U.S. Senate against incumbent Republican senator Dan Sullivan. Alaska Beacon and Anchorage Daily News reported that the Wisconsin-based super PAC Right For Alaska spent $219,000 promoting Southworth's campaign, in an attempt to act as a spoiler against Sullivan's candidacy. Alaska Beacon discovered FEC reports from a Dutch Harbor resident named Earl Southworth, who previously donated to the Kamala Harris presidential campaign in 2024 and a state senate campaign for Democrat Forrest Dunbar. Southworth failed to advance past the jungle primary, placing ninth among a field of sixteen candidates, with 0.5% of the total vote.

== Positions ==
The Alaskan Party shares similar positions with the preceding Alaskan Independence Party. The party does not call for Alaskan secession, but advocates for an in-state referendum that would include the option of Alaska becoming an independent country. The party maintains the 1958 statehood vote was flawed and lacked options for becoming a commonwealth or total independence from the United States, unlike statehood referendums for other U.S. territories like Puerto Rico. The Alaskan Party also opposes federal ownership of Alaskan land, claiming it makes Alaska dependent on the federal government.

In an op–ed published by the political blog The Alaska Story, party co–founder Bob Bird stated that the Alaskan Party would be sympathetic towards voters who want "limited government and constitutionally recognized rights," including disaffected Republicans and Libertarians.

== Election results ==
=== Congressional elections ===
| Year | Candidate | Chamber | Primary election | | | General election | | | Notes | Ref |
| Year | Candidate | Chamber | Votes | % | Result | Votes | % | Result | Notes | Ref |
|---|---|---|---|---|---|---|---|---|---|---|
| 2026 | Earl D. "Skip" Southworth | Senate | 803 | 0.48% | Lost | Did not advance | | | | |
