= Lee McKinley =

American politician

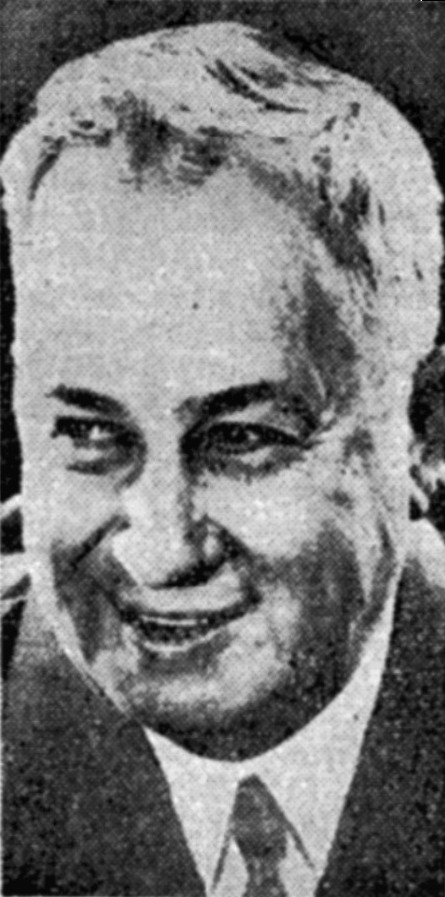
- McKinley in 1960

Personal details
- Born: Lee Lawrence McKinley; August 22, 1906 DeQueen, Arkansas, U.S.
- Died: November 12, 1986 (aged 80) Palmer, Alaska, U.S.
- Party: Republican
- Education: University of Missouri, Kansas City (DDS)

Lee Lawrence McKinley (August 22, 1906 – November 12, 1986) was an American dentist and politician. McKinley was the Republican nominee for U.S. Senator from Alaska in 1960 and again in 1966. He lost both times to incumbent Bob Bartlett. He also served one term in the Alaska Territorial House of Representatives, from 1953 to 1955. He was one of a number of Republicans elected to that legislature who only served in that legislature, due to the differing attitudes of voters in the 1952 and 1954 elections.

Born and raised in Arkansas, McKinley practiced dentistry in Detroit, Michigan for over a decade before moving to the Territory of Alaska after World War II. Establishing an office in downtown Anchorage, he practiced in Anchorage for over three decades before retiring in 1981. Applying for a homestead on land in what is now Butte, Alaska, he cleared an airstrip on the property and began flying to rural communities throughout Alaska. He was one of a small handful of Anchorage-based doctors to take the initiative to provide their services to rural communities in this fashion (others included Milo Fritz, an ear, nose and throat doctor, and Lloyd Hines, an optometrist), in the years before Alaska's transportation and health care delivery networks allowed easy access to urban health care facilities. As a result of these exploits, McKinley became known as "The Flying Dentist".

Party political offices
Preceded by R. E. Robertson	Republican nominee for U.S. Senator from Alaska (Class 2); 1960, 1966	Succeeded by Ted Stevens
