= 1960 United States presidential election in Alaska =

- November 8, 1960

Nominee	Richard Nixon	John F. Kennedy
Party	Republican	Democratic
Home state	California	Massachusetts
Running mate	Henry Cabot Lodge Jr.	Lyndon B. Johnson
Electoral vote	3	0
Popular vote	30,953	29,809
Percentage	50.94%	49.06%

Nixon
50–60%
60–70%
70–80%
Kennedy
50–60%
60–70%
70–80%
President before election
Dwight D. Eisenhower
Republican
Elected President
John F. Kennedy
Democratic

The 1960 United States presidential election in Alaska took place on November 8, 1960, as part of the nationwide presidential election. This was the first presidential election that Alaska participated in. Voters chose three representatives, or electors, to the Electoral College, who voted for president and vice president.

Alaska was narrowly won by incumbent Vice-president Richard Nixon (R-California) with 50.9% of the popular vote against U.S. Senator John F. Kennedy (D-Massachusetts) with 49.1%; a 1.8% margin. Prior to the election, The New York Times declared Kennedy the favorite in the state.

Interior Department Chief Legal Officer (Solicitor) Ted Stevens managed Nixon's campaign in the state, being key to Nixon's narrow victory in what was then a solidly Democratic state which hadn't elected a Republican to state-wide office since James Wickersham was elected at-large Territorial Delegate in 1930. Stevens would become a U.S. Senator 8 years later.

This is the only time a Democrat was elected without carrying Bethel. Kennedy's 49.06% vote share remains the second best of any Democrat in a presidential election in the state, after Lyndon B. Johnson's landslide victory in the following election.

== Results ==
1960 United States presidential election in Alaska
Party	Candidate	Votes	Percentage	Electoral votes
Republican	Richard Nixon	30,953	50.94%	3
Democratic	John F. Kennedy	29,809	49.06%	0
Totals		60,762	100.00%	3

=== By borough ===
Borough	Richard Nixon Republican		John F. Kennedy Democratic		Margin		Total votes cast
Borough	#	%	#	%	#	%	Total votes cast
Aleutians East	72	30.00%	168	70.00%	-96	-40.00%	240
Aleutians West	90	28.57%	225	71.43%	-135	-42.86%	315
Anchorage	11,119	53.71%	9,581	46.29%	1,538	7.42%	20,700
Bethel	785	67.27%	382	32.73%	403	34.54%	1,167
Bristol Bay	83	29.64%	197	70.36%	-114	-40.72%	280
Denali	68	38.42%	109	61.58%	-41	-23.16%	177
Dillingham	192	41.03%	276	58.97%	-84	-17.94%	468
Fairbanks North Star	3,818	48.40%	4,070	51.60%	-252	-3.20%	7,888
Haines	152	55.27%	123	44.73%	29	10.54%	275
Hoonah-Angoon	301	46.52%	346	53.48%	-45	-6.96%	647
Juneau	2,328	52.49%	2,107	47.51%	221	4.98%	4,435
Kenai Peninsula	1,573	47.28%	1,754	52.72%	-181	-5.44%	3,327
Ketchikan Gateway	1,911	52.50%	1,729	47.50%	182	5.00%	3,640
Kodiak Island	631	42.12%	867	57.88%	-236	-15.76%	1,498
Kusilvak	151	34.16%	291	65.84%	-140	-31.68%	442
Lake and Peninsula	121	36.45%	211	63.55%	-90	-27.10%	332
Matanuska-Susitna	1,152	52.20%	1,055	47.80%	97	4.40%	2,207
Nome	1,007	55.98%	792	44.02%	215	11.96%	1,799
North Slope	348	39.55%	532	60.45%	-184	-20.90%	880
Northwest Arctic	555	68.94%	250	31.06%	305	37.88%	805
Petersburg	391	52.41%	355	47.59%	36	4.82%	746
Prince of Wales-Hyder	473	45.52%	566	54.48%	-93	-8.96%	1,039
Sitka	982	46.28%	1,140	53.72%	-158	-7.44%	2,122
Skagway	100	31.15%	221	68.85%	-121	-37.70%	321
Southeast Fairbanks	365	55.14%	297	44.86%	68	10.28%	662
Valdez-Cordova	693	48.77%	728	51.23%	-35	-2.46%	1,421
Wrangell	360	55.73%	286	44.27%	74	11.46%	646
Yakutat	59	44.70%	73	55.30%	-14	-10.60%	132
Yukon-Koyukuk	1,067	49.58%	1,085	50.42%	-18	-0.84%	2,152
Totals	30,953	50.94%	29,809	49.06%	1,144	1.88%	60,762

== Electors ==
With statehood, Alaska was given three votes in the Electoral College. This has continued to be the case to the present day. Alaska's electors in 1960 were:

1. Charles D. Jones, of Nome
2. Milton D. Snodgrass, of Palmer
3. Sylvia Ringstad, of Fairbanks

== See also ==
- United States presidential elections in Alaska
- 1960 United States Senate election in Alaska

== Bibliography ==
- Slotnick, Herman E. (March 1961). Anderson, Totton J. (ed.). "The 1960 Election in Alaska". The Western Political Quarterly. 14 (1, Part 2, The 1960 Elections in the West). University of Utah: 300–304. doi:10.2307/443850. JSTOR 443850.
- "State of Alaska Secretary of State Official Returns General Election (November 8, 1960)" (PDF). Alaska Division of Elections.
