= David Cuddy =

American politician (born 1952)

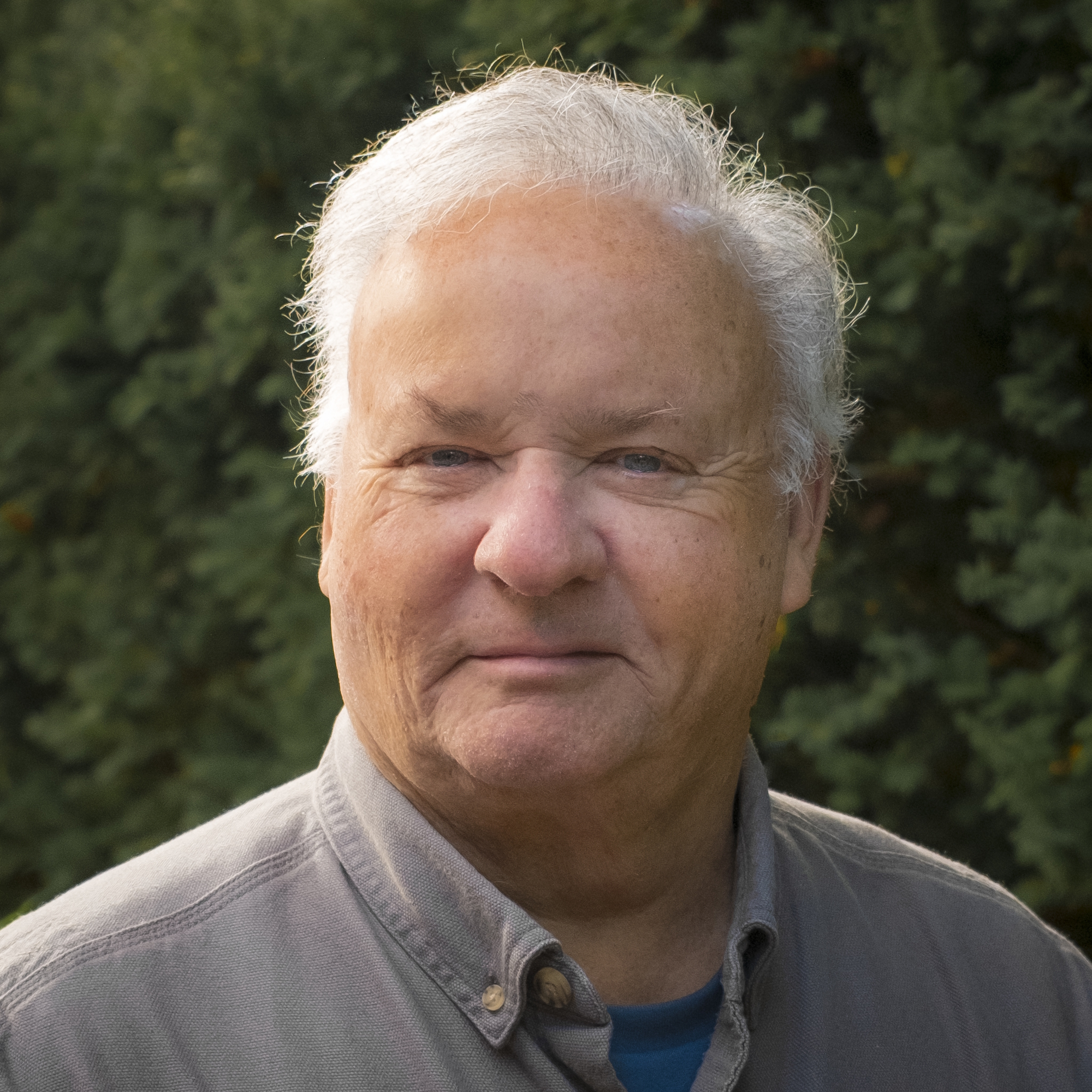

Member of the Alaska House of Representatives from the 7th district
- In office January 3, 1981 – January 3, 1983 Serving with Russ Meekins Jr., Donald Clocksin, Michael Beirne
- Preceded by: Multi-member district
- Succeeded by: Redistricted

Personal details
- Born: September 16, 1952 (age 73)
- Party: Republican
- Education: Duke University (BA)

David Warren Cuddy (born September 16, 1952) is a businessman and Republican Party politician from the U.S. state of Alaska. He served a single term in the Alaska House of Representatives from 1981 to 1983.

David Warren Cuddy was born in Anchorage, Alaska to Daniel Hon "Dan" and Betty Jane "Betti" (née Puckett) Cuddy. He was named after his uncle (and Dan Cuddy's only sibling), who died in World War II in 1944. Growing up in Anchorage (where he has lived for most of his life), he graduated from West Anchorage High School in 1970, and went on to earn a B.A. in economics from Duke University in 1974.

Cuddy joined the business operated by his family, First National Bank of Anchorage (now called First National Bank Alaska) in 1972, working his way up from teller to loan officer, and eventually president. Cuddy was elected to a single term in the Alaska House of Representatives in 1980. A combination of redistricting and pressure from Dick Randolph to defect to the Libertarian Party played heavily in his decision not to run for re-election. In 1996 and 2008, Cuddy unsuccessfully challenged Ted Stevens in the Alaska Republican U.S. Senate primary.

Cuddy lists his occupation as an independent film producer. In 2001, he worked for a California-based entertainment firm as a business consultant to independent filmmakers, and left them in 2003. While acting as executive producer on the film Light in the Forest, he met Austin-based screenwriter Bonnie Orr, and in 2007 he began construction of a film studio in Austin, Texas.

== See also ==
- 1996 United States Senate election in Alaska
- 2008 United States Senate election in Alaska

Honorary titles
Preceded by Randy Phillips	Youngest member of the Alaska House of Representatives; 1981 - 1983	Succeeded by Rick Uehling
