= 1978 United States Senate election in Alaska =

- November 7, 1978
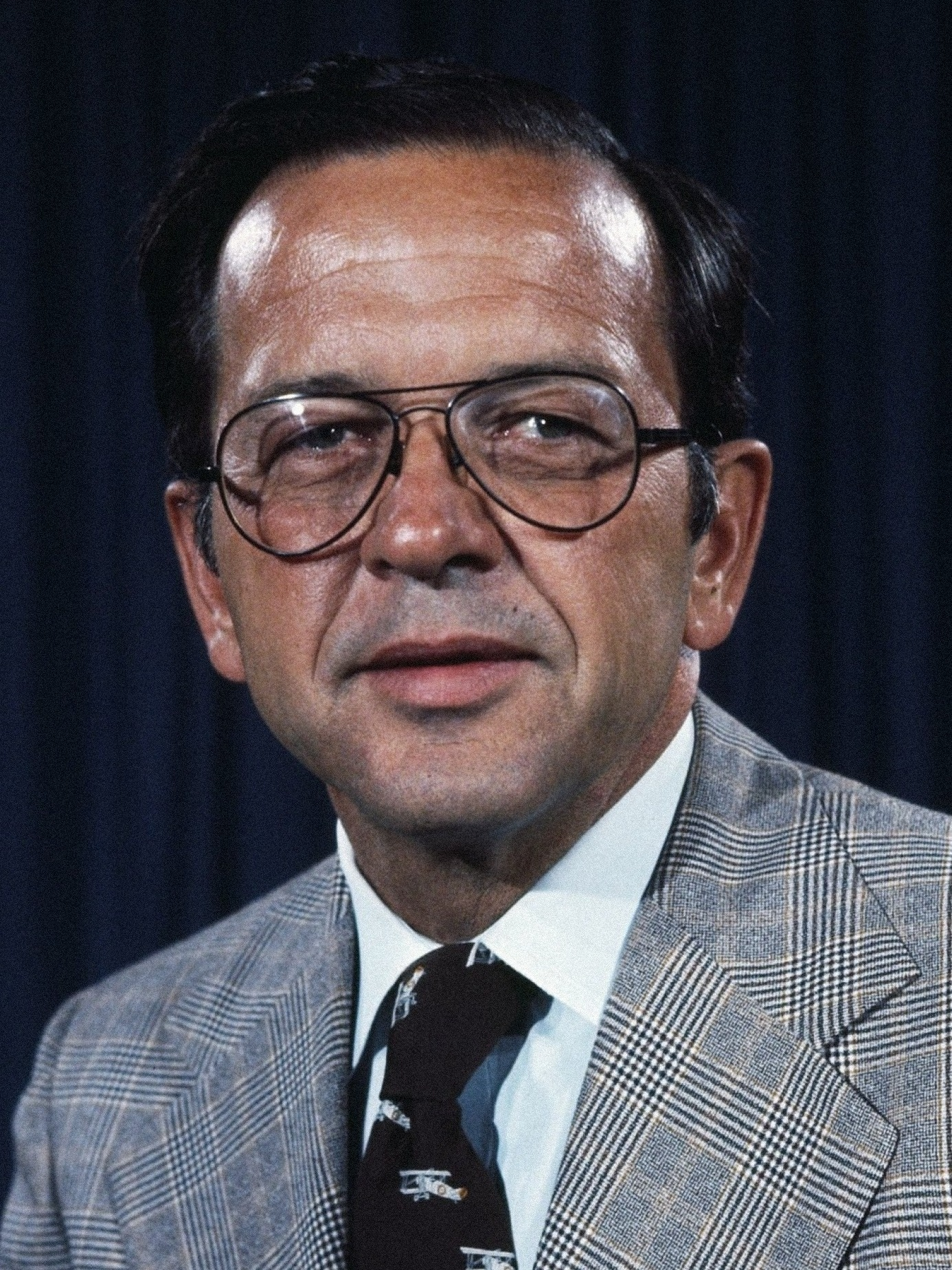

Nominee	Ted Stevens	Donald Hobbs
Party	Republican	Democratic
Popular vote	92,783	29,574
Percentage	75.59%	24.10%
- Results by state house district Stevens: 60–70% 70–80% 80–90%
U.S. senator before election
Ted Stevens
Republican
Elected U.S. Senator
Ted Stevens
Republican

The 1978 United States Senate election in Alaska was held on November 7, 1978. Incumbent Republican U.S. Senator Ted Stevens was re-elected to a third term (a second full term) in office, defeating Democrat Donald Hobbs.

== Open primary ==
=== Candidates ===
==== Democratic ====
- Donald W. Hobbs, candidate for Senate in 1974
- Joseph A. Sonneman, attorney and photographer from Juneau

==== Republican ====
- Ted Stevens, incumbent Senator

=== Results ===
1978 Senate primary
Party	Candidate	Votes	%
Republican	Ted Stevens (incumbent)	83,528	81.27%
Democratic	Donald W. Hobbs	10,589	10.30%
Democratic	Joseph A. Sonneman	8,662	8.43%
Total votes		102,779	100.00%

== General election ==
=== Results ===
General election results
Party	Candidate	Votes	%	±%
Republican	Ted Stevens (incumbent)	92,783	75.59%	▼1.71
Democratic	Donald W. Hobbs	29,574	24.10%	▲1.40
Write-in	All others	384	0.31%	▲0.31
Total votes		133,364	100.00%	
Republican hold		Swing		

== See also ==
- 1978 United States Senate elections
