= Bob Bird (politician) =

American politician (born 1951)

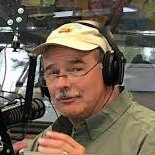
- Bob Bird on the microphone at KSRM, interviewing Don Young in May 2018

Chair of the Alaskan Independence Party
- In office 2020 – April 2024
- Succeeded by: John Howe

Personal details
- Born: August 1, 1951 (age 75) Evanston, Illinois
- Party: Alaskan (since 2026)
- Other political affiliations: Republican (until 2004); Alaskan Independence (2004–2026)
- Occupation: Teacher, activist

Robert M. Bird (born August 1, 1951, Evanston, Illinois) is an American conservative activist, retired high school teacher, home-school tutor and the former chairman of the Alaskan Independence Party (AIP). He was the AIP's candidate for the United States Senate seat formerly occupied by Ted Stevens in the 2008 senate election.

Bird has been teaching for over 50 years on the secondary, collegiate, and home-school levels, at high schools in Alaska and Minnesota, and at Kenai Peninsula College. He has been a radio broadcaster for KSRM radio in Kenai for the Alaska Baseball League, high school hockey games, and radio talk shows.

== Education ==
Bird earned his B.S. degree from Bemidji State University in Minnesota, where he majored in Social Studies. He earned his Master's degree in History from Minnesota State University, Mankato in 1992.

Bird attended the Shroud Educational Endeavors Corporation [SEEC] international symposium in St. Louis in August 2025. This continued his decades-long work as an amateur lecturer on the Shroud of Turin. Possessing a life-sized replica, he has toured Florida, New Jersey, Illinois, Minnesota, Iowa and Alaska.

== Political career ==
Bird ran as a Republican in the 1990 Alaska primary against incumbent Ted Stevens, earning 34,000 votes to Stevens' 81,000. Bird's notoriety stemmed from organizing and leading the first two events of the Alaska Rescue Project in 1989, the largest civil disobedience event in the state's history. Bird led the first two when over 150 were arrested, and the final three brought the total to over 225.

He served as president of Alaska Right to Life from 1995–1997, was a delegate to the 1996 Republican National Convention in San Diego as a Pat Buchanan supporter from the Reform Party in Long Beach, California in 2000.

Since the election, Bird has been promoting nullification. He was instrumental in garnering statewide support in 2013 for HB 69, a nullification bill aimed at striking down any future federal gun control laws. He appeared on television, radio, and print columns throughout the state, as well as organizing large rallies that included a live presentation from Dr. Thomas Woods, explaining nullification's history. The bill passed after watered-down modifications and was signed into law by then-governor Sean Parnell. Bird retired after forty-one years of secondary school instruction in 2015 and immediately signed a contract with Kenai Peninsula College as an adjunct faculty member.

He debated Dr. Forrest Nabors of the University of Alaska/Anchorage on November 20, 2015, at the Loussac Library in Anchorage on the topic of "Lincoln's Legacy: Hero or Tyrant?", taking the libertarian position of Lincoln being a usurper of the Constitution. As Nabors was a protégé of Henry Jaffa, the debate was seen as a reprise of the Jaffa/DiLorenzo debate of 2003.

Bird continued with another public debate in front of a large audience on Feb. 1, 2022. Accepting the challenge to debate whether or not Alaskans ought to vote for a constitutional convention in November. Former Senate majority leader John Coghill and Bird met in a Lincoln-Douglas format in Wasilla. Bird maintained that the many problems in the current constitution, created before statehood by the 1955 convention, were too overwhelming to ignore. Coghill, the son of one of the original convention delegates, agreed changes were necessary, but maintained that the risks of liberal and socialist influences would overwhelm the selection of delegates.

=== Alaskan Independence Party ===
Bird joined the Alaskan Independence Party (AIP) in 2004 and was a delegate to the Constitution Party's national convention as a supporter of Michael Peroutka.

In 2008, the Alaskan Independence Party nominated Bird as their candidate for the United States Senate. Bird's opponents included Republican Ted Stevens and Democrat Mark Begich. On October 29, 2008, Bird was endorsed by former Republican U.S. presidential candidate Rep. Ron Paul of Texas.

The November 4, 2008, general election featured five candidates for the U.S. Senate for Alaska: Mark Begich (Democrat), Bob Bird (Alaskan Independence), Ted Gianoutsos (Unaffiliated), Dave Haase (Libertarian), and Ted Stevens (Republican). The outcome was not resolved for two weeks until absentee, questioned and early voting results were tabulated. Begich defeated Stevens by 3,724 votes (150,728 to 147,004). Because Bird took 13,197 votes (4.15%), an article in The Washington Post'' by Chris Cillizza and Paul Kane suggested that Bird "may end up being the most important third-party candidate in the 2008 race"

In October 2020, following the death of long-serving Chairman Lynette Clark of Fairbanks in May, Bird was chosen Chairman of the Alaskan Independence Party at a convention in Wasilla. The AIP enjoyed a growth spurt in 2020 with enrollment topping 20,000 by December.

Bird was chosen again at the 2022 convention in Soldotna, but was voted out at the Fairbanks convention in April 2024, replaced by John Wayne Howe, a protege of Joe Vogler. Bird was criticized for hosting a live interview with presidential candidate Robert F. Kennedy, Jr on his radio show. This faction thought that Bird was not fund raising more aggressively, and even though Bird spoke against endorsing Kennedy and it was overwhelmingly rejected, even entertaining the thought was a bad idea.

Bird opposed the AIP board's 2025 decision to dissolve the party, and said that he would attempt to reestablish it. Following unsuccessful efforts to persuade state officials to postpone the AIP's dissolution, Bird formed the new Alaskan Party as a successor.

== Broadcasting ==
Since January 2017, Bird has hosted an afternoon talk show, "The Bird's Eye View", now titled "The Talk of the Kenai" on KSRM Radio 920, online at radiokenai.com. It features politics, religion, the arts, health and nutrition, human interest stories, and the Alaskan outdoors. He has won four Alaskan Broadcaster's Association "Goldie" awards, most notably for interviewing witnesses of the Iliamna "monster" cryptid.

In August 2025 Bird was cited by the Alaska Broadcasters Association as the recipient of the "Broadcaster of the Year" award. The ABA noted Bird’s efforts in keeping Alaskans informed during breaking news events and his role in connecting communities across the state. His contributions extend beyond local airwaves, with his commentary and reporting reaching national outlets as well.

“Bob Bird embodies the mission of Alaska broadcasting—serving the community with dedication, clarity, and a deep commitment to both information and tradition,” the ABA said in its announcement.
