= 1990 United States Senate election in Alaska =

- November 6, 1990
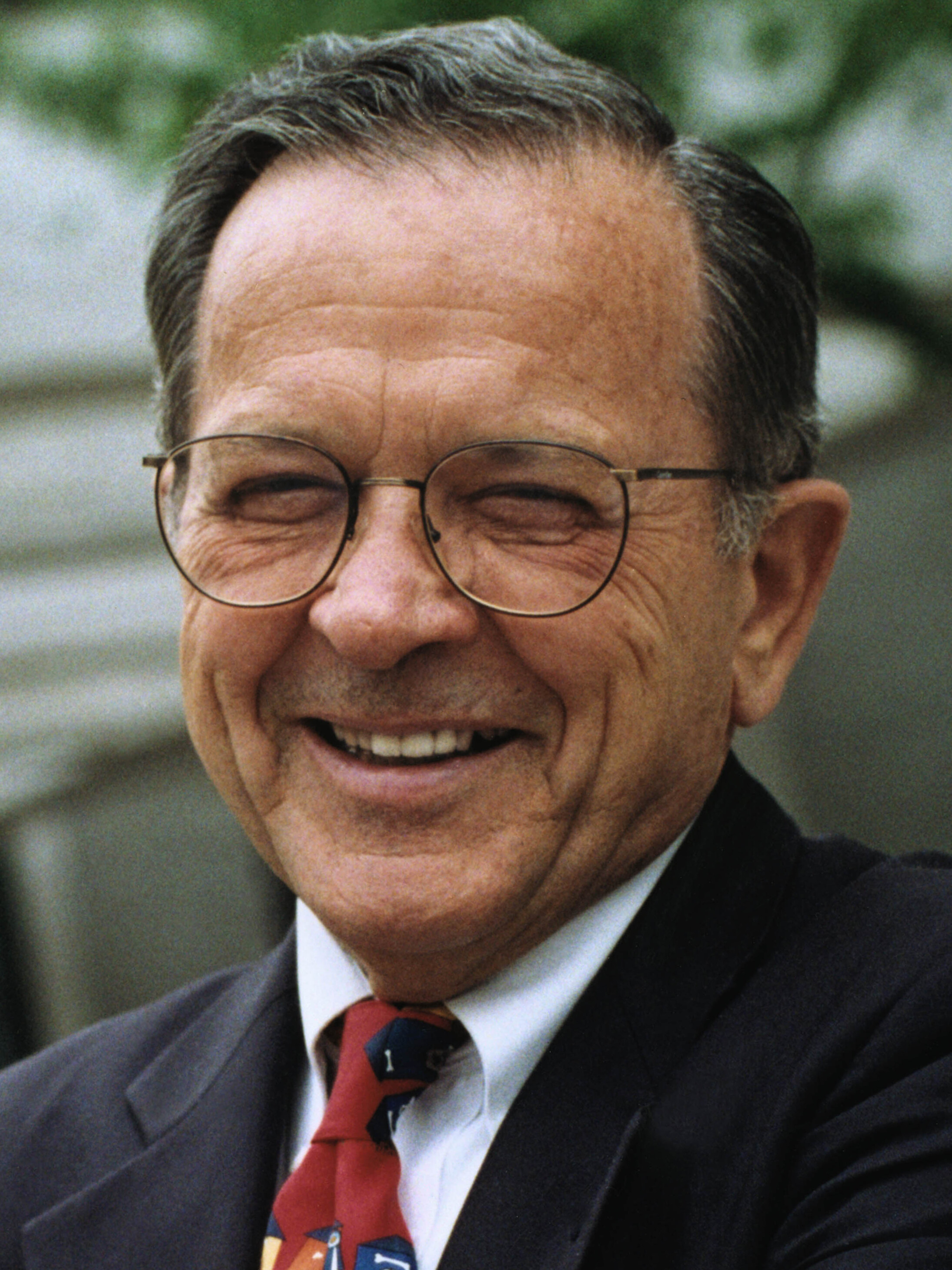

| Nominee | Ted Stevens | Michael Beasley |
| Party | Republican | Democratic |
| Popular vote | 125,806 | 61,152 |
| Percentage | 66.23% | 32.19% |
- Results by state house district Stevens: 50–60% 60–70% 70–80%
U.S. senator before election
Ted Stevens
Republican
Elected U.S. Senator
Ted Stevens
Republican

The 1990 United States Senate election in Alaska was held on November 6, 1990. Incumbent Republican United States Senator Ted Stevens sought re-election to a fifth term (a fourth full term) in the United States Senate, which he won easily, besting his opponents in a landslide.

== Open primary ==
=== Candidates ===
==== Democratic ====
- Michael Beasley, perennial candidate
- Tom Taggart

==== Republican ====
- Ted Stevens, incumbent United States Senator since 1968
- Robert M. Bird, anti-abortion activist

=== Results ===
Open primary results
| Party | Candidate | Votes | % |
|---|---|---|---|
| Republican | Ted Stevens (Incumbent) | 81,968 | 59.19% |
| Republican | Bob Bird | 34,824 | 25.15% |
| Democratic | Michael Beasley | 12,371 | 8.93% |
| Democratic | Tom Taggart | 9,329 | 6.74% |
| Total votes | | 138,492 | 100.00% |

== General election ==
=== Results ===
1990 United States Senate election in Alaska
| Party | Candidate | Votes | % | ±% |
|---|---|---|---|---|
| Republican | Ted Stevens (Incumbent) | 125,806 | 66.23% | −4.94% |
| Democratic | Michael Beasley | 61,152 | 32.19% | +3.71% |
| Write-ins | | 2,999 | 1.58% | |
| Majority | | 64,654 | 34.04% | −8.65% |
| Turnout | | 189,957 | | |
| Republican hold | | Swing | | |

== See also ==
- 1990 United States Senate elections
