= 1960 United States Senate election in Alaska =

- November 8, 1960
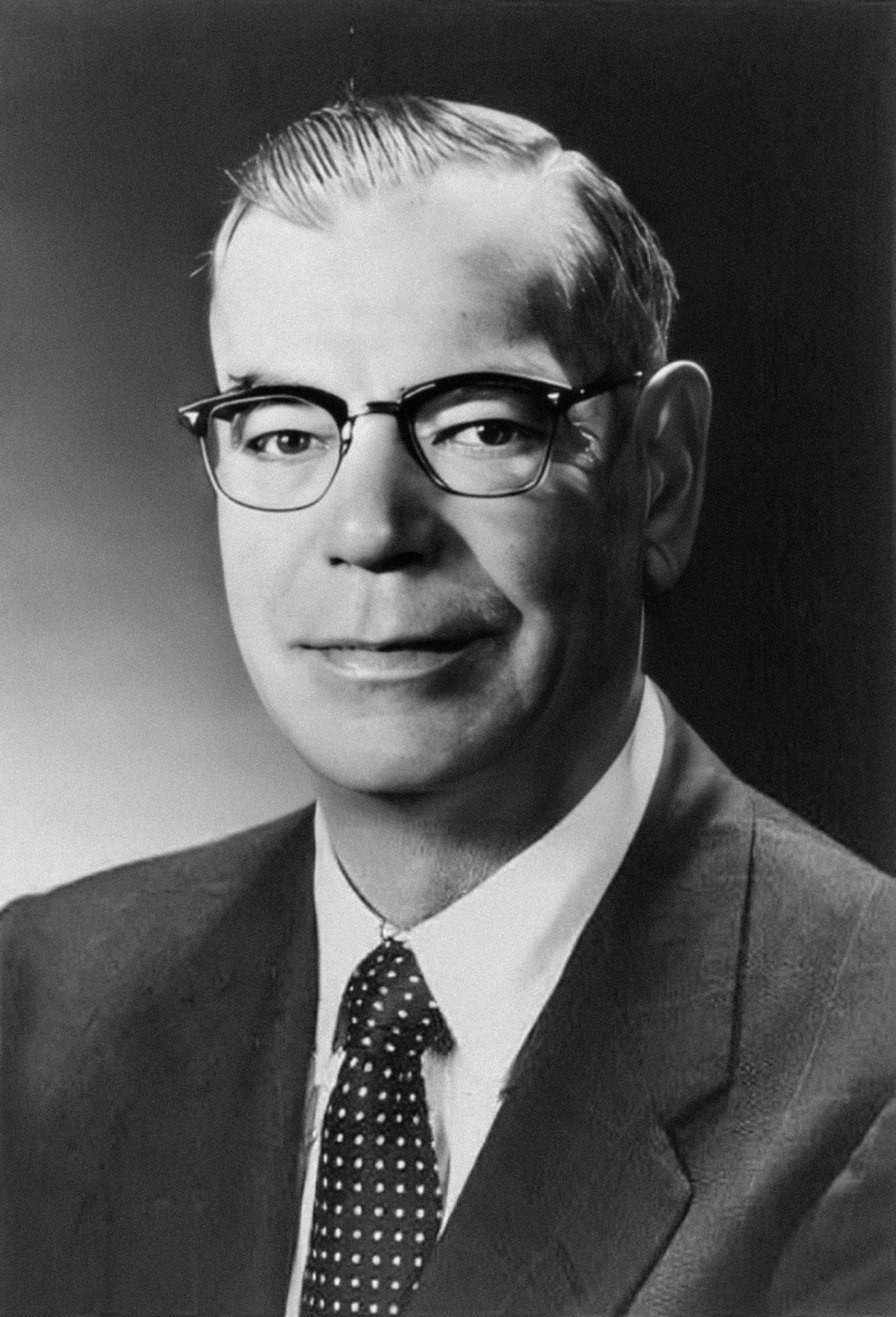

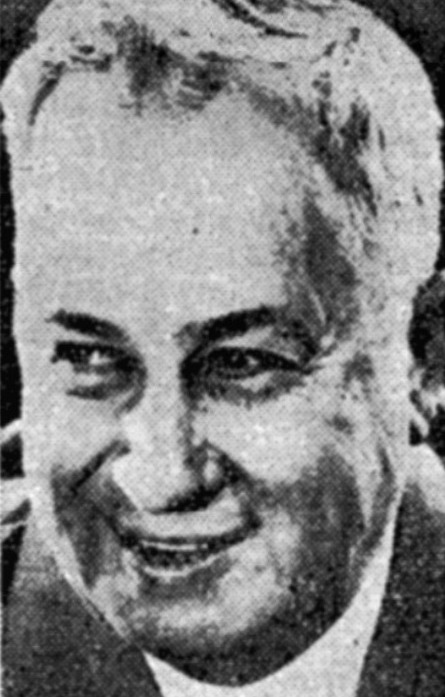
Nominee	Bob Bartlett	Lee McKinley
Party	Democratic	Republican
Popular vote	38,041	21,937
Percentage	63.43%	36.58%
- Results by election district Bartlett: 50–60% 60–70% 70–80% 80–90% McKinley: 50–60%
U.S. senator before election
Bob Bartlett
Democratic
Elected U.S. Senator
Bob Bartlett
Democratic

The 1960 United States Senate election in Alaska was held on November 8, 1960. Despite Republican Presidential candidate Richard Nixon defeating John F. Kennedy in the state by a close margin, popular incumbent Democratic U.S. Senator Bob Bartlett was re-elected to a full term in office, defeating Republican dentist Lee McKinley.

Bartlett was considered unbeatable within the state, having support from both Democrats & Republicans. Dentist Lee McKinley defeated Lawrence Brayton, a leader in the minor Alaska Party before the race, in the primary, with Brayton endorsing McKinley and becoming a campaign manager for the south-central district. The party did not provide much support to McKinley, who also did not campaign personally. McKinley pledged to stand against socialism and excessive federal intervention and spending. McKinley was unable to spark interest, except for one incident where his campaign plane, which fit in with his reputation as the "Flying Dentist", was downed, and McKinley was left stranded for a day before being found by a bush pilot.

McKinley later took Secretary of State Hugh Wade to court over irregularities with the ballot, including the inability to inform voters that they could cross party line to vote and that the option to vote for a straight-party ticket had been designed as a circle rather than a square. Spending remained low, with the highest budget coming from Bartlett's campaign, who self-admittedly raised only $13,000.

== Republican primary ==
=== Candidates ===
- Lawrence M. Brayton
- Lee McKinley, dentist and Territorial Representative 1953–1955

=== Results ===
1960 Republican U.S. Senate primary
Party	Candidate	Votes	%
Republican	Lee McKinley	8,867	68.22%
Republican	Lawrence M. Brayton	4,131	31.78%
Total votes		12,998	100.00%

== General election ==
=== Results ===
General election results
Party	Candidate	Votes	%	±%
Democratic	Bob Bartlett (inc.)	38,041	63.43%	▼20.40
Republican	Lee McKinley	21,937	36.58%	▲21.63
Total votes		59,978	100.00%	

== See also ==
- 1960 United States Senate elections
