= John Havelock =

Attorney General of Alaska (1971–1973)

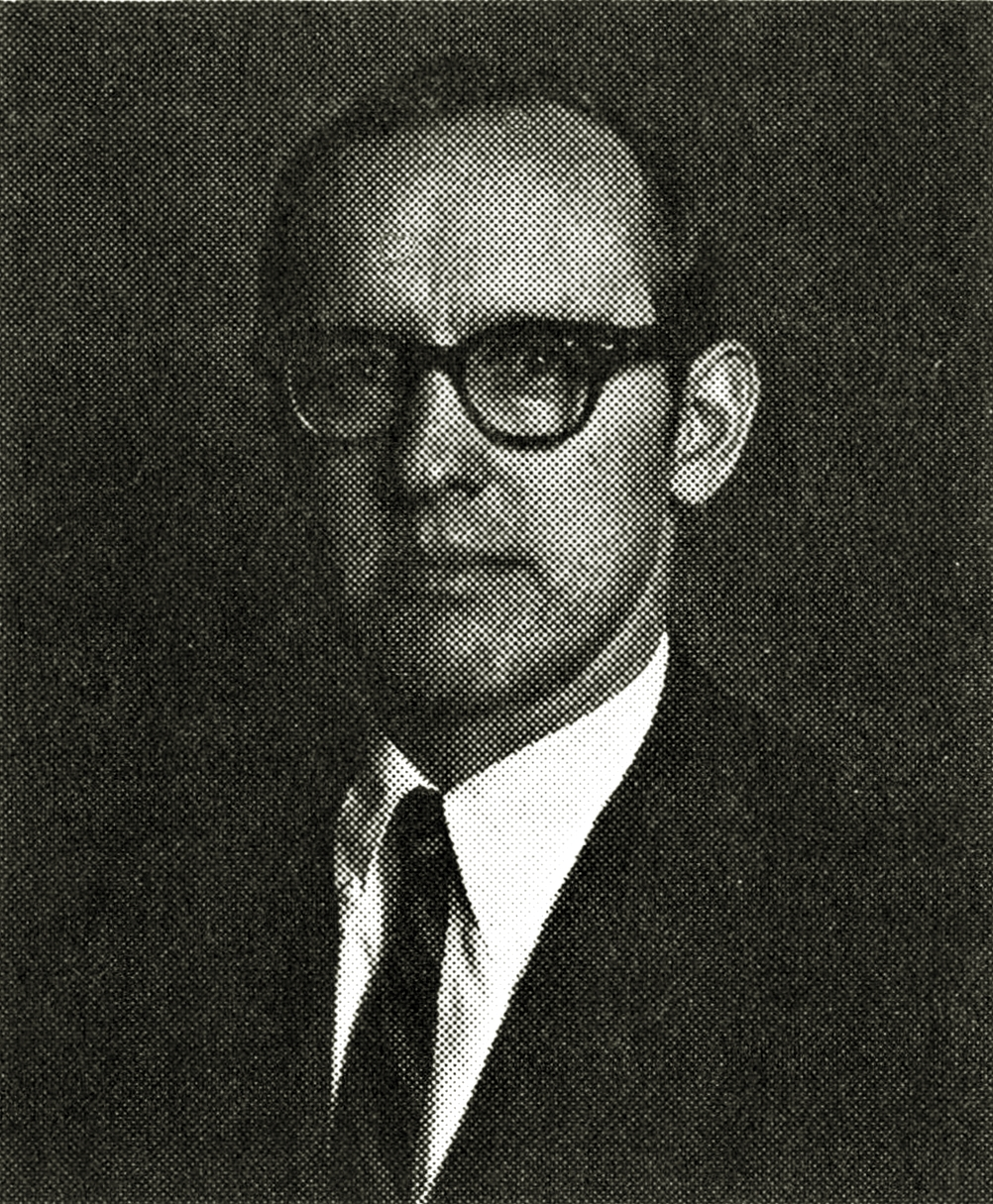

Attorney General of Alaska
- In office 1971–1973
- Governor: William A. Egan
- Preceded by: G. Kent Edwards
- Succeeded by: Norman C. Gorsuch

Personal details
- Born: July 30, 1932 Toronto, Canada
- Died: August 31, 2021 (aged 89) Anchorage, Alaska
- Party: Democratic

John Eric Havelock (July 30, 1932 – August 31, 2021) was the Attorney General of Alaska from 1971 to 1973, a champion of individual privacy and Native American resource and subsistence rights. Born in Toronto, Canada, Havelock moved to the United States and attended first boarding school, then Harvard University for an undergraduate degree and a Juris Doctor degree before moving to Alaska. After working for the Alaska Department of Law, Havelock worked as staff at the White House before his appointment as Attorney General of Alaska in 1970.

During his term, Havelock wrote the state constitution's privacy amendment. He also supported or assisted in creating policies around the Alaska Native Claims Settlement Act, the Trans-Alaska Pipeline System, and traditional and subsistence fishing rights. After his term, Havelock returned to private practice, ran for political office, and taught at the University of Alaska Anchorage where he became a founding director of the university's Criminal Justice Center.

== Early life ==
Havelock was born in Toronto, Canada and emigrated to the United States when he was fourteen years old. He attended boarding school in the U.S. and then Harvard University, until he was drafted into the U.S. Army where he served as a military police investigator. After his discharge, he reentered Harvard, graduating with a Bachelor of Arts in 1956 and a Juris Doctor from Harvard Law School in 1959, after which he moved to Alaska.

== Career ==
After four years at the Alaska Department of Law, he entered private practice. In 1967 Havelock was named a Fellow at the White House, working as a special assistant to Orville Freeman, the Secretary of Agriculture. He was appointed as the state's Attorney General by Governor Bill Egan in 1970, an office he held for three years. In that capacity he drafted the Constitutional Privacy Amendment. According to Havelock, then-Senate President Republican Terry Miller gave Havelock a draft privacy amendment intended for the Alaska Constitution. Finding it too wordy, Havelock instead drafted a twenty-word substitute which was adopted as he had written it: "The right of the people to privacy is recognized and shall not be infringed. The legislature shall implement this section." As Havelock described the process: "So I went back to the office and I wrote it the way it is now and went out in the hall, handed it to him, and that became the Privacy Amendment."

Any amendment to the state's constitution requires obtaining approval of the voters. They gave it sufficient support when it appeared on a ballot, and it was approved as Section 22 of the Alaskan Constitution.

Havelock's privacy amendment became the foundation of Alaska Supreme Court opinions decriminalizing marijuana and upholding the right to abortion. Its original intent and implementation as written in 1972 was concerning the government's collection of Alaskans' personal data, but Havelock subsequently contended its coverage included abortion rights. "It is a broad idea. Privacy should apply to that situation, [...] A woman's consultation with her doctor — Jiminy Crickets. There's a limit to what you can do with that with a judicial proceeding."

Havelock also assisted in crafting the Alaska Native Claims Settlement Act (ANCSA) which negotiated and substantially preserved the rights of those Natives whose traditional lands overrode the crude oil deposits. In addition, his efforts were central to enabling the Trans-Alaska Pipeline System (TAPS), which enabled the right-of-way and privately funded 800-mile pipeline. He also help to write the resource legislation that codified traditional and subsistence fishing rights, preserving conservation of fisheries and domination by "outside" interests and insulating against those of foreign corporations.

=== Post-Attorney General career ===
After leaving his position as Attorney General, he became a founding partner in the Anchorage firm of Ely, Guess, Rudd & Havelock (now Guess & Rudd). He was elected to the board of the state bar association, representing the state bar at the American Bar Association. He also took an appointment as the administrator of the Alaska Bar Association.

In 1974, he ran unsuccessfully for the U.S. House, losing to Alaska Native Willie Hensley in the Democratic primary. Ten years after that loss, he finished second in the All-party primary for U.S. Senate though he lost to Republican incumbent Ted Stevens in the general election.

In 1977, he became a professor at the University of Alaska Anchorage, where he taught justice and political science. He was a founding director of the university's Criminal Justice Center and its legal studies program. In 1990, he unsuccessfully ran for an Anchorage seat in the state Senate.

After the 1989 Exxon Valdez oil spill, he became the lead lawyer and staff director for the state of Alaska commission which was tasked with investigating the accident.

In 2012, Havelock published a book, Let's Get It Right: Why We Need an Alaska Constitutional Convention, supporting the convening of a new state constitutional convention.

He co-founded and headed the law firm Havelock and Duffy until his retirement in 2019.

Shortly before he died, Havelock reflected on his life and legacy. He said, from a hospital bed in his home, "I am a short-timer, you understand. [...] Well, I'm happy about it. I've had a good, strong life, full of accomplishments, and I don't need anything else."

== Personal life ==
He married several times, the last being May 17, 2008 to Mona (Pitts) Havelock who became his widow. They had a "shared family" of five children and seven grandchildren.

Legal offices
Preceded by G. Kent Edwards	Attorney General of Alaska; 1971–1973	Succeeded by Norman C. Gorsuch
