= 1958 United States Senate elections in Alaska =

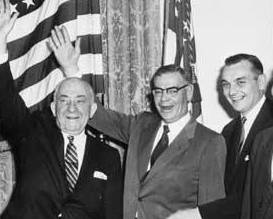
Three of the four candidates for U.S. Senate celebrate Alaska statehood. From left to right: Ernest Gruening, Bob Bartlett, and Mike Stepovich.

The 1958 United States Senate elections in Alaska were held November 25, 1958. The elections were held in anticipation of Alaska's admission as the forty-ninth state in the union, effective January 3, 1959. The state held two simultaneous elections to determine their first senators.

Both elections were won by the Democratic Party. The new senators, Bob Bartlett and Ernest Gruening, were sworn into office alongside those senators elected in the 1958 United States Senate elections held three weeks earlier.

== Class 2 ==
1958 class 2 Senate election
- November 25, 1958
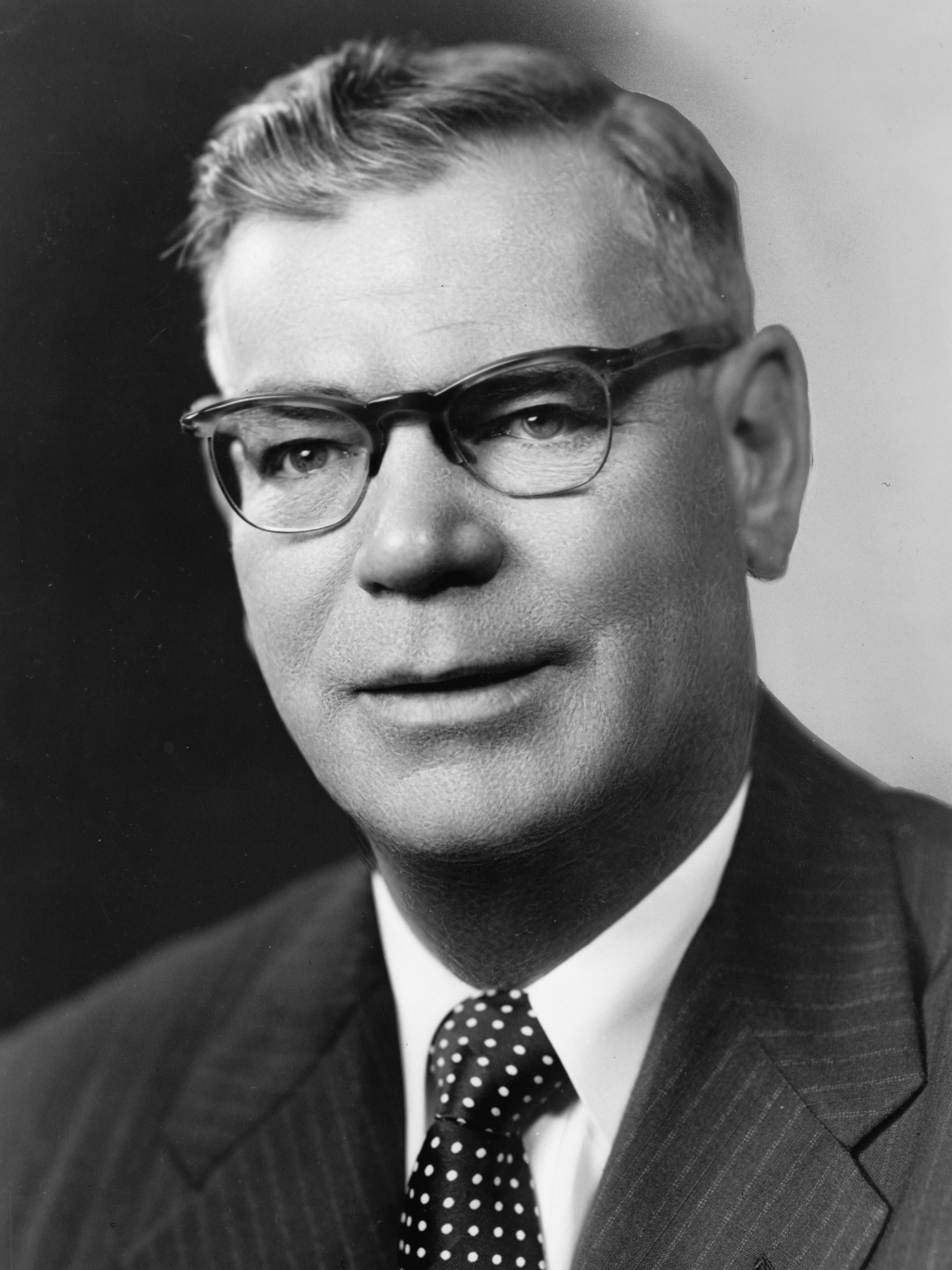

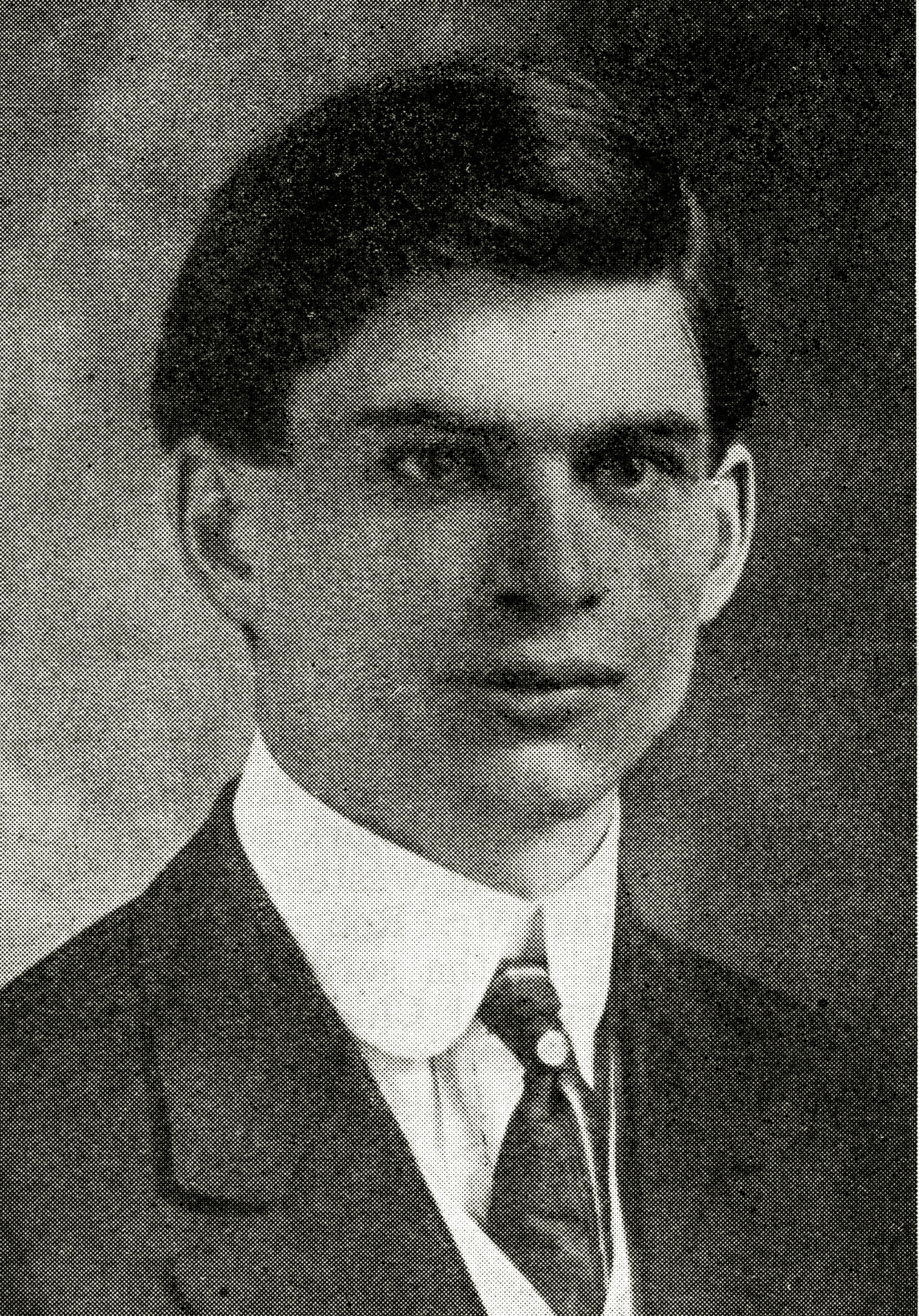
Nominee	Bob Bartlett	R. E. Robertson
Party	Democratic	Republican
Popular vote	40,939	7,299
Percentage	83.83%	14.95%
- Results by election district Bartlett: 70–80% 80–90%
Elected U.S. Senator
Bob Bartlett
Democratic

This election was for the class 2 term expiring in 1961. It was won by Democrat Bob Bartlett.

=== Democratic primary ===
==== Candidates ====
- Bob Bartlett, Territorial Delegate at-large to the U.S. House of Representatives

==== Results ====
Delegate Bartlett was unopposed for the Democratic nomination.

Alaska regular election (class 2)
Party	Candidate	Votes	%
Democratic	Bob Bartlett	38,642	100.00%
Total votes		38,642	100.00%

=== Republican primary ===
==== Candidates ====
- R. E. Robertson, attorney and former Mayor of Juneau

==== Results ====
Robertson was unopposed for the Republican nomination.

Alaska regular election (class 2)
Party	Candidate	Votes	%
Republican	R. E. Robertson	8,049	100.00%
Total votes		8,049	100.00%

=== General election ===
==== Results ====
Alaska regular election (class 2)
Party	Candidate	Votes	%
Democratic	Bob Bartlett	40,939	83.83%
Republican	R. E. Robertson	7,299	14.95%
Independent	Keith Capper (write-in)	599	1.23%
Majority		33,640	68.88%
Turnout		48,837	
Democratic win (new seat)			

== Class 3 ==
1958 class 3 Senate election
- November 25, 1958
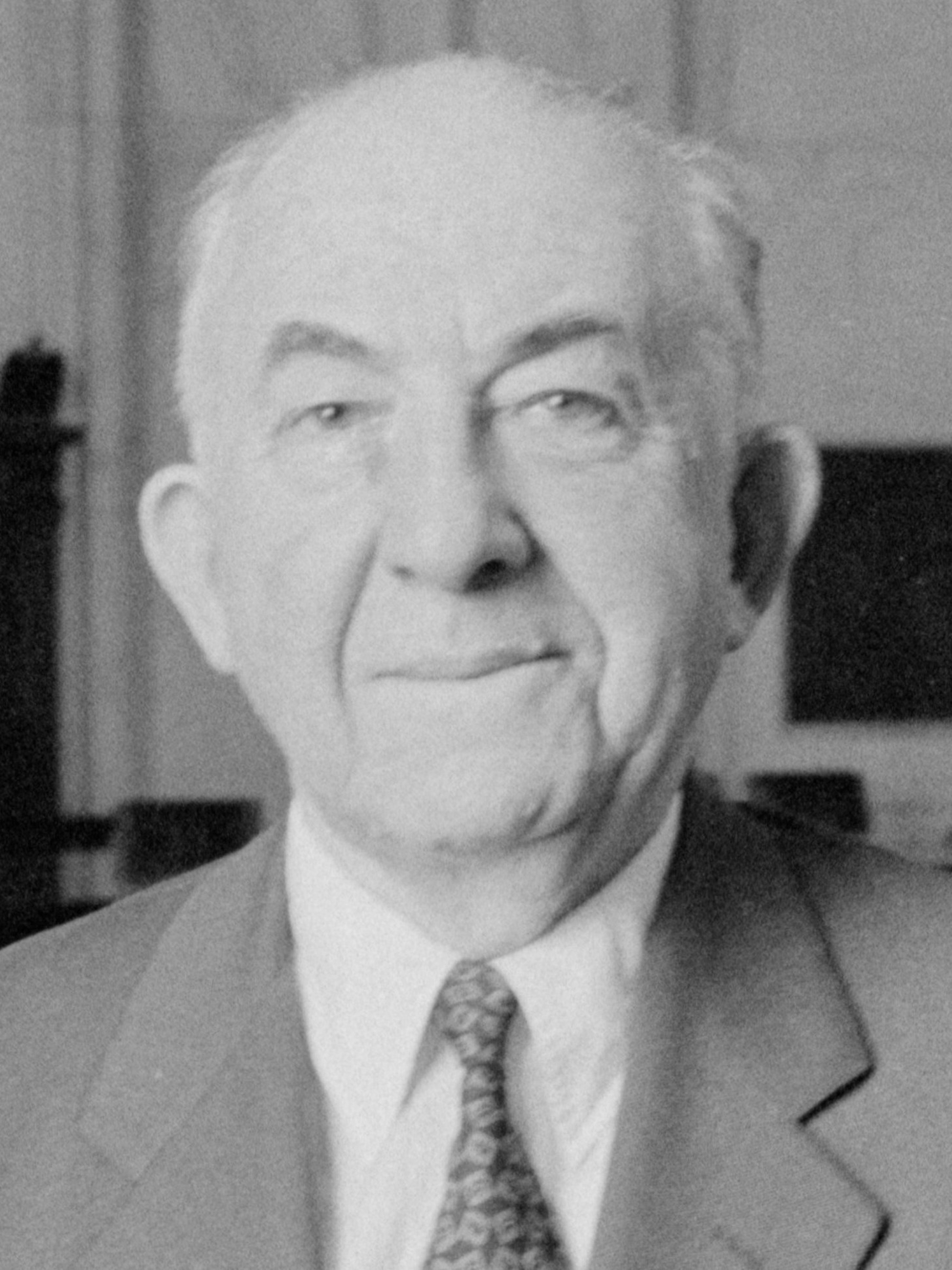

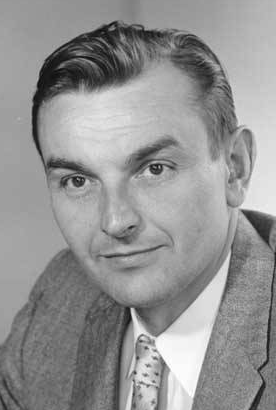
Nominee	Ernest Gruening	Mike Stepovich
Party	Democratic	Republican
Popular vote	26,045	23,464
Percentage	52.61%	47.39%
- Results by election district Gruening: 50–60% 60–70% 70–80% Stepovich: 50–60% 60–70%
Elected U.S. Senator
Ernest Gruening
Democratic

This election was for the class 3 term expiring in 1963. It was won by Democrat Ernest Gruening.

=== General election ===
==== Candidates ====
- Ernest Gruening, former Territorial Governor (1939–1953) (Democratic)
- Mike Stepovich, incumbent Territorial Governor (Republican)

==== Results ====
Alaska regular election (class 3)
Party	Candidate	Votes	%
Democratic	Ernest Gruening	26,045	52.61%
Republican	Mike Stepovich	23,464	47.39%
Majority		2,581	5.22%
Turnout		49,509	
Democratic win (new seat)			
