= Theresa Obermeyer =

American politician (born 1945)

Member of the Anchorage School Board from Seat F
- In office 1990–1994
- Preceded by: Jean Buchanan
- Succeeded by: Harriet Drummond

Personal details
- Born: Theresa Nangle; July 25, 1945 (age 81) St. Louis, Missouri, U.S.
- Party: Democratic
- Education: Maryville University (BA); Saint Louis University (MEd, PhD)

Theresa Nangle Obermeyer (born July 25, 1945), is an American educator who is a former Anchorage, Alaska school board member, having served 2 two-year terms from 1990 to 1994. Obermeyer made an unsuccessful run against Republican Ted Stevens for the United States Senate in 1996.

== Life and career ==
Obermeyer was born Theresa Nangle in 1945 in St. Louis, Missouri. After studying at Villa Duchesne High School from 1959 until 1963, she received a BA in political science from the Maryville University in St. Louis in 1967. A subsequent Master of Education in 1970 and a Ph.D. in education, from St. Louis University followed.

On December 23, 1977 she married Thomas Obermeyer, an attorney in Missouri; they have four children.

She worked in different jobs in education at different colleges in Missouri and Maryland before working as Assistant Director for student activities at St. Louis Community College–Florissant Valley from 1973 until 1978. She then moved to Alaska where she became the Director of Student Services at the Anchorage Community College of University of Alaska Anchorage. Between 1981 and 1993, she was an instructor at Chapman University, and between 1984 and 1990 a teacher at the McLaughlin Youth Center.

From 1990 until 1994 she sat on the board of the Anchorage School District, and in 1993 she was the treasurer of the board.

In 1996, she ran for the U.S. Senate. She was the highest-placed Democratic candidate in the open primary, receiving 4,072 votes (3.37) and advancing to the general election with Republican incumbent Ted Stevens and Jed Whittaker of the Green Party. In the general election, Stevens was re-elected with 177,893 votes (76.71%). Obermeyer received 24,133 (10.51%, finishing behind Whittaker, who took 29,037 votes (12.52%).

In a capsule summary of the 1996 Alaska Senate election campaign, The New Republic wrote that Obermeyer "spent the campaign haranguing Stevens for masterminding her husband's failure to pass the bar exam -- over twenty times. She also accused Stevens of arranging to put her in jail -- she spent twenty-nine days in jail this summer after being arrested a second time on charges of disturbing the peace at Alaska's federal court building." The summary also noted that in their debate, Obermeyer asked Stevens, "Could you respond sir, or do you have Alzheimer's?" while he "implored her to 'go find some help.'" As of 2016, her husband had yet to pass the Alaska Bar Association exam.

Party political offices
Preceded by Michael Beasley	Democratic nominee for U.S. Senator from Alaska (Class 2); 1996	Succeeded by Frank Vondersaar
