= List of United States senators from Alaska =

Current delegation

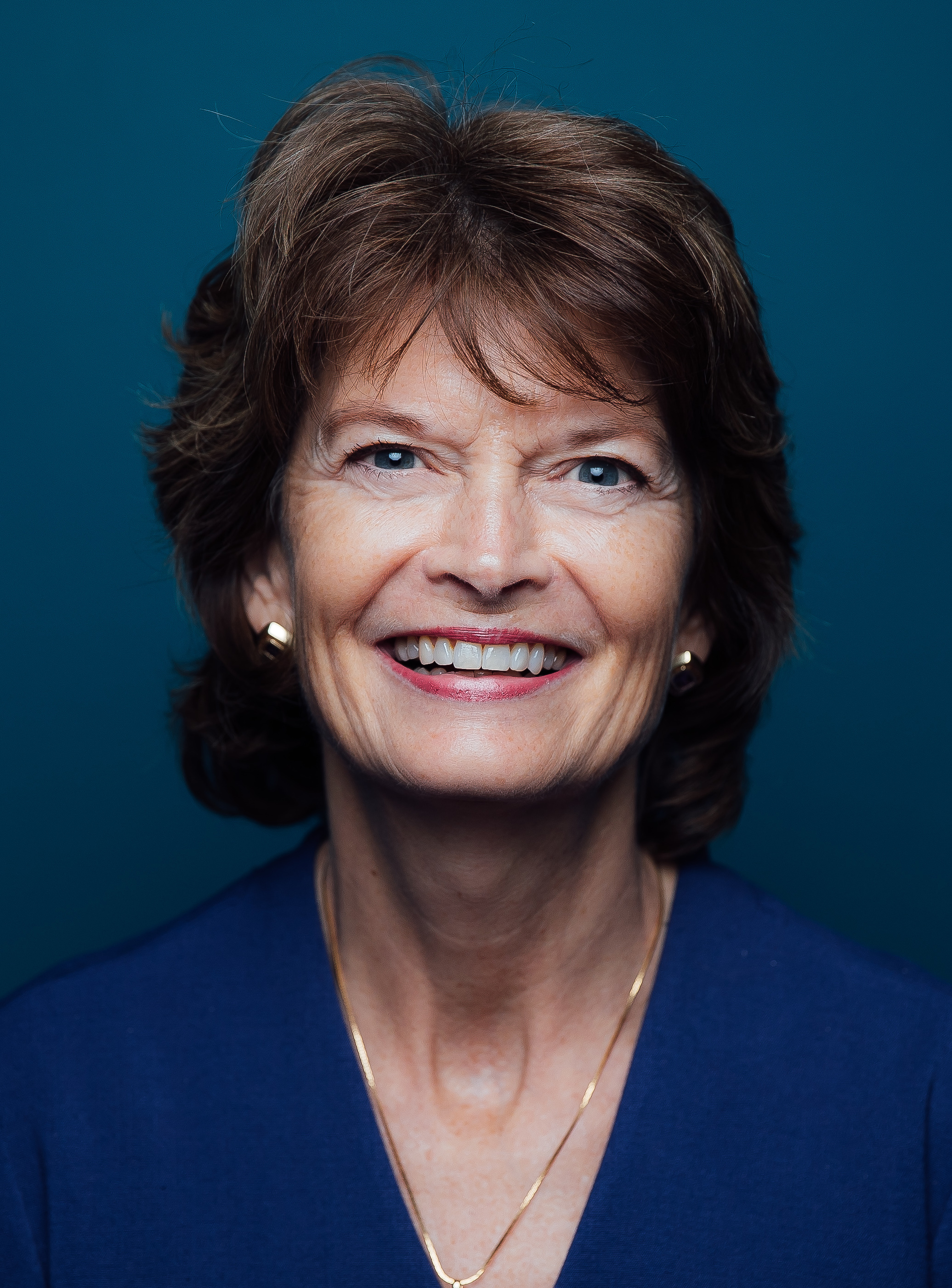
Lisa Murkowski (R)

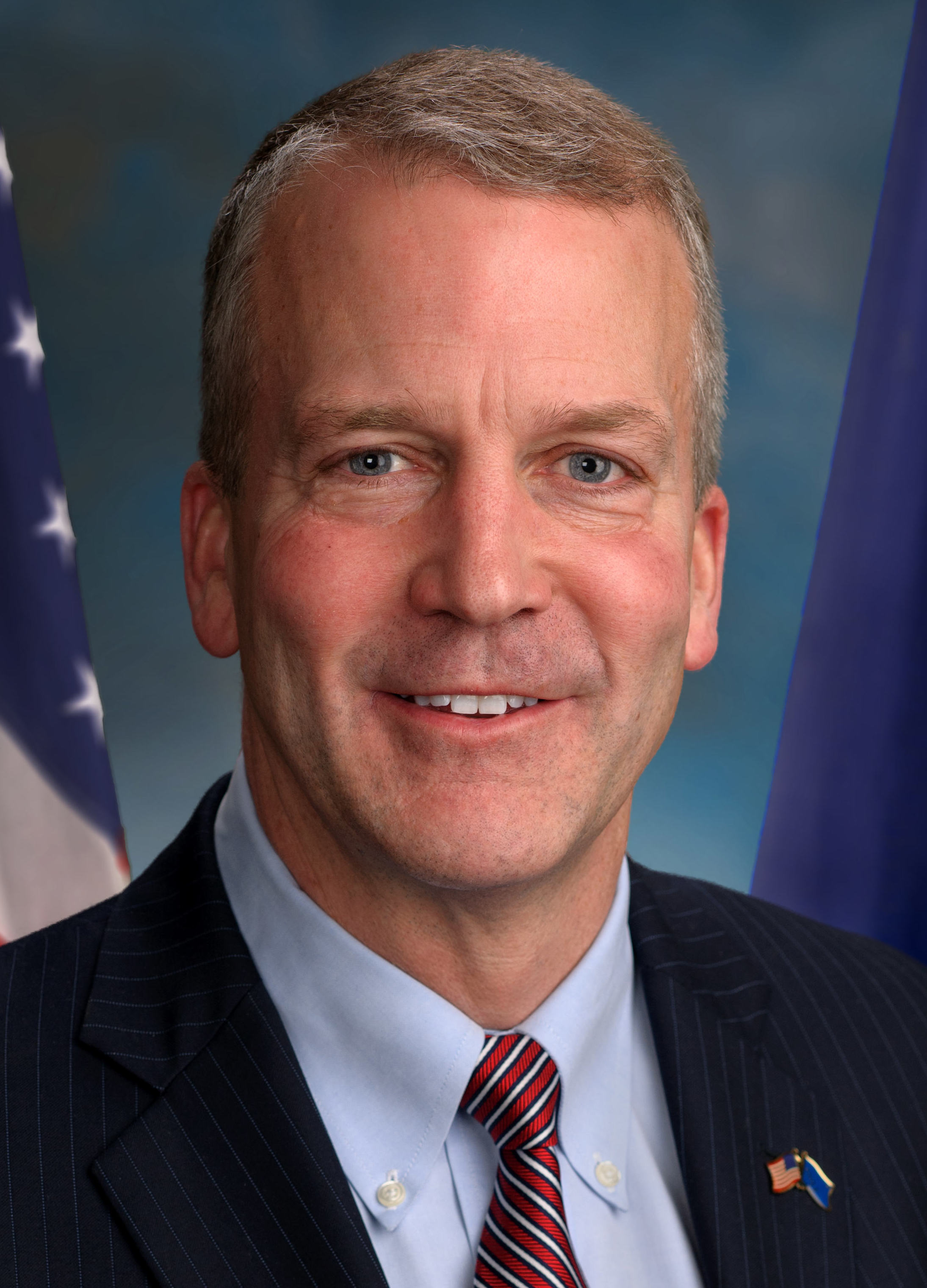
Dan Sullivan (R)

(ordered by seniority)

Alaska was admitted to the Union on January 3, 1959. Alaska's United States Senate seats belong to class 2 and class 3. The state's current senators are Republicans Lisa Murkowski (serving since 2002) and Dan Sullivan (serving since 2015). A total of eight people have represented Alaska in the U.S. Senate. Ted Stevens was Alaska's longest serving U.S. senator, serving from 1968 to 2009.

== List of senators ==
Class 2 Class 2 senators belong to the electoral cycle that most recently had regular elections in 2008, 2014, 2020, and 2026. The next election will be in 2032.						C	Class 3 Class 3 senators belong to the electoral cycle that most recently had regular elections in 2004, 2010, 2016, and 2022. The next election will be in 2028.					
#	Senator	Party	Dates in office	Electoral history	T	C	T	Electoral history	Dates in office	Party	Senator	#
1	Bob Bartlett (Juneau)	Democratic	Jan 3, 1959 – Dec 11, 1968	Elected in 1958.	1	86th	1	Elected in 1958.	Jan 3, 1959 – Jan 3, 1969	Democratic	Ernest Gruening (Juneau)	1
1	Bob Bartlett (Juneau)	Democratic	Jan 3, 1959 – Dec 11, 1968	Re-elected in 1960.	2	87th	1	Elected in 1958.	Jan 3, 1959 – Jan 3, 1969	Democratic	Ernest Gruening (Juneau)	1
1	Bob Bartlett (Juneau)	Democratic	Jan 3, 1959 – Dec 11, 1968	Re-elected in 1960.	2	88th	2	Re-elected in 1962. Lost renomination and then lost re-election as a write-in candidate.	Jan 3, 1959 – Jan 3, 1969	Democratic	Ernest Gruening (Juneau)	1
1	Bob Bartlett (Juneau)	Democratic	Jan 3, 1959 – Dec 11, 1968	Re-elected in 1960.	2	89th	2	Re-elected in 1962. Lost renomination and then lost re-election as a write-in candidate.	Jan 3, 1959 – Jan 3, 1969	Democratic	Ernest Gruening (Juneau)	1
1	Bob Bartlett (Juneau)	Democratic	Jan 3, 1959 – Dec 11, 1968	Re-elected in 1966. Died.	3	90th	2	Re-elected in 1962. Lost renomination and then lost re-election as a write-in candidate.	Jan 3, 1959 – Jan 3, 1969	Democratic	Ernest Gruening (Juneau)	1
Vacant			Dec 11, 1968 – Dec 24, 1968		3	90th	2	Re-elected in 1962. Lost renomination and then lost re-election as a write-in candidate.	Jan 3, 1959 – Jan 3, 1969	Democratic	Ernest Gruening (Juneau)	1
2	Ted Stevens (Girdwood)	Republican	Dec 24, 1968 – Jan 3, 2009	Appointed to continue Bartlett's term. Elected in 1970 to finish Bartlett's term.	3	90th	2	Re-elected in 1962. Lost renomination and then lost re-election as a write-in candidate.	Jan 3, 1959 – Jan 3, 1969	Democratic	Ernest Gruening (Juneau)	1
2	Ted Stevens (Girdwood)	Republican	Dec 24, 1968 – Jan 3, 2009	Appointed to continue Bartlett's term. Elected in 1970 to finish Bartlett's term.	3	91st	3	Elected in 1968.	Jan 3, 1969 – Jan 3, 1981	Democratic	Mike Gravel (Anchorage)	2
2	Ted Stevens (Girdwood)	Republican	Dec 24, 1968 – Jan 3, 2009	Appointed to continue Bartlett's term. Elected in 1970 to finish Bartlett's term.	3	92nd	3	Elected in 1968.	Jan 3, 1969 – Jan 3, 1981	Democratic	Mike Gravel (Anchorage)	2
2	Ted Stevens (Girdwood)	Republican	Dec 24, 1968 – Jan 3, 2009	Re-elected in 1972.	4	93rd	3	Elected in 1968.	Jan 3, 1969 – Jan 3, 1981	Democratic	Mike Gravel (Anchorage)	2
2	Ted Stevens (Girdwood)	Republican	Dec 24, 1968 – Jan 3, 2009	Re-elected in 1972.	4	94th	4	Re-elected in 1974. Lost renomination.	Jan 3, 1969 – Jan 3, 1981	Democratic	Mike Gravel (Anchorage)	2
2	Ted Stevens (Girdwood)	Republican	Dec 24, 1968 – Jan 3, 2009	Re-elected in 1972.	4	95th	4	Re-elected in 1974. Lost renomination.	Jan 3, 1969 – Jan 3, 1981	Democratic	Mike Gravel (Anchorage)	2
2	Ted Stevens (Girdwood)	Republican	Dec 24, 1968 – Jan 3, 2009	Re-elected in 1978.	5	96th	4	Re-elected in 1974. Lost renomination.	Jan 3, 1969 – Jan 3, 1981	Democratic	Mike Gravel (Anchorage)	2
2	Ted Stevens (Girdwood)	Republican	Dec 24, 1968 – Jan 3, 2009	Re-elected in 1978.	5	97th	5	Elected in 1980.	Jan 3, 1981 – Dec 2, 2002	Republican	Frank Murkowski (Fairbanks)	3
2	Ted Stevens (Girdwood)	Republican	Dec 24, 1968 – Jan 3, 2009	Re-elected in 1978.	5	98th	5	Elected in 1980.	Jan 3, 1981 – Dec 2, 2002	Republican	Frank Murkowski (Fairbanks)	3
2	Ted Stevens (Girdwood)	Republican	Dec 24, 1968 – Jan 3, 2009	Re-elected in 1984.	6	99th	5	Elected in 1980.	Jan 3, 1981 – Dec 2, 2002	Republican	Frank Murkowski (Fairbanks)	3
2	Ted Stevens (Girdwood)	Republican	Dec 24, 1968 – Jan 3, 2009	Re-elected in 1984.	6	100th	6	Re-elected in 1986.	Jan 3, 1981 – Dec 2, 2002	Republican	Frank Murkowski (Fairbanks)	3
2	Ted Stevens (Girdwood)	Republican	Dec 24, 1968 – Jan 3, 2009	Re-elected in 1984.	6	101st	6	Re-elected in 1986.	Jan 3, 1981 – Dec 2, 2002	Republican	Frank Murkowski (Fairbanks)	3
2	Ted Stevens (Girdwood)	Republican	Dec 24, 1968 – Jan 3, 2009	Re-elected in 1990.	7	102nd	6	Re-elected in 1986.	Jan 3, 1981 – Dec 2, 2002	Republican	Frank Murkowski (Fairbanks)	3
2	Ted Stevens (Girdwood)	Republican	Dec 24, 1968 – Jan 3, 2009	Re-elected in 1990.	7	103rd	7	Re-elected in 1992.	Jan 3, 1981 – Dec 2, 2002	Republican	Frank Murkowski (Fairbanks)	3
2	Ted Stevens (Girdwood)	Republican	Dec 24, 1968 – Jan 3, 2009	Re-elected in 1990.	7	104th	7	Re-elected in 1992.	Jan 3, 1981 – Dec 2, 2002	Republican	Frank Murkowski (Fairbanks)	3
2	Ted Stevens (Girdwood)	Republican	Dec 24, 1968 – Jan 3, 2009	Re-elected in 1996.	8	105th	7	Re-elected in 1992.	Jan 3, 1981 – Dec 2, 2002	Republican	Frank Murkowski (Fairbanks)	3
2	Ted Stevens (Girdwood)	Republican	Dec 24, 1968 – Jan 3, 2009	Re-elected in 1996.	8	106th	8	Re-elected in 1998. Resigned when elected Governor of Alaska.	Jan 3, 1981 – Dec 2, 2002	Republican	Frank Murkowski (Fairbanks)	3
2	Ted Stevens (Girdwood)	Republican	Dec 24, 1968 – Jan 3, 2009	Re-elected in 1996.	8	107th	8	Re-elected in 1998. Resigned when elected Governor of Alaska.	Jan 3, 1981 – Dec 2, 2002	Republican	Frank Murkowski (Fairbanks)	3
2	Ted Stevens (Girdwood)	Republican	Dec 24, 1968 – Jan 3, 2009	Re-elected in 1996.	8	107th	8		Dec 2, 2002 – Dec 20, 2002	Vacant		
2	Ted Stevens (Girdwood)	Republican	Dec 24, 1968 – Jan 3, 2009	Re-elected in 1996.	8	107th	8	Appointed to finish her father's term.	Dec 20, 2002 – present	Republican	Lisa Murkowski (Girdwood)	4
2	Ted Stevens (Girdwood)	Republican	Dec 24, 1968 – Jan 3, 2009	Re-elected in 2002. Lost re-election.	9	108th	8	Appointed to finish her father's term.	Dec 20, 2002 – present	Republican	Lisa Murkowski (Girdwood)	4
2	Ted Stevens (Girdwood)	Republican	Dec 24, 1968 – Jan 3, 2009	Re-elected in 2002. Lost re-election.	9	109th	9	Elected to a full term in 2004.	Dec 20, 2002 – present	Republican	Lisa Murkowski (Girdwood)	4
2	Ted Stevens (Girdwood)	Republican	Dec 24, 1968 – Jan 3, 2009	Re-elected in 2002. Lost re-election.	9	110th	9	Elected to a full term in 2004.	Dec 20, 2002 – present	Republican	Lisa Murkowski (Girdwood)	4
3	Mark Begich (Anchorage)	Democratic	Jan 3, 2009 – Jan 3, 2015	Elected in 2008. Lost re-election.	10	111th	9	Elected to a full term in 2004.	Dec 20, 2002 – present	Republican	Lisa Murkowski (Girdwood)	4
3	Mark Begich (Anchorage)	Democratic	Jan 3, 2009 – Jan 3, 2015	Elected in 2008. Lost re-election.	10	112th	10	Lost renomination, but re-elected as a write-in candidate in 2010.	Dec 20, 2002 – present	Republican	Lisa Murkowski (Girdwood)	4
3	Mark Begich (Anchorage)	Democratic	Jan 3, 2009 – Jan 3, 2015	Elected in 2008. Lost re-election.	10	113th	10	Lost renomination, but re-elected as a write-in candidate in 2010.	Dec 20, 2002 – present	Republican	Lisa Murkowski (Girdwood)	4
4	Dan Sullivan (Anchorage)	Republican	Jan 3, 2015 – present	Elected in 2014.	11	114th	10	Lost renomination, but re-elected as a write-in candidate in 2010.	Dec 20, 2002 – present	Republican	Lisa Murkowski (Girdwood)	4
4	Dan Sullivan (Anchorage)	Republican	Jan 3, 2015 – present	Elected in 2014.	11	115th	11	Re-elected in 2016.	Dec 20, 2002 – present	Republican	Lisa Murkowski (Girdwood)	4
4	Dan Sullivan (Anchorage)	Republican	Jan 3, 2015 – present	Elected in 2014.	11	116th	11	Re-elected in 2016.	Dec 20, 2002 – present	Republican	Lisa Murkowski (Girdwood)	4
4	Dan Sullivan (Anchorage)	Republican	Jan 3, 2015 – present	Re-elected in 2020. Lost re-election.	12	117th	11	Re-elected in 2016.	Dec 20, 2002 – present	Republican	Lisa Murkowski (Girdwood)	4
4	Dan Sullivan (Anchorage)	Republican	Jan 3, 2015 – present	Re-elected in 2020. Lost re-election.	12	118th	12	Re-elected in 2022 in an instant runoff election.	Dec 20, 2002 – present	Republican	Lisa Murkowski (Girdwood)	4
4	Dan Sullivan (Anchorage)	Republican	Jan 3, 2015 – present	Re-elected in 2020. Lost re-election.	12	119th	12	Re-elected in 2022 in an instant runoff election.	Dec 20, 2002 – present	Republican	Lisa Murkowski (Girdwood)	4
5	Mary Peltola (elect) (Bethel)	Democratic	Taking office Jan 3, 2027	Elected in 2026.	13	120th	12	Re-elected in 2022 in an instant runoff election.	Dec 20, 2002 – present	Republican	Lisa Murkowski (Girdwood)	4
5	Mary Peltola (elect) (Bethel)	Democratic	Taking office Jan 3, 2027	Elected in 2026.	13	121st	13	To be determined in the 2028 election.				
5	Mary Peltola (elect) (Bethel)	Democratic	Taking office Jan 3, 2027	Elected in 2026.	13	122nd	13	To be determined in the 2028 election.				
To be determined in the 2032 election.					14	123rd	13	To be determined in the 2028 election.				

== In fiction ==
They Shall Have Stars, the first volume in science fiction writer James Blish's Cities in Flight series, was published in 1950 and is set in a fictional 2013. A major character is Alaska Senator Bliss Wagoner, head of the Joint Congressional Committee on Space Flight, who is depicted as playing a crucial role in Humanity's spread into space. At the time of writing, Alaska was not yet a state and had no senators, but Blish correctly assumed that this would come about by 2013.

== See also ==
- Alaska's congressional delegations
- Elections in Alaska
- List of United States representatives from Alaska
- List of United States Senate elections in Alaska
- Political party strength in Alaska
- Politics of Alaska
