= 2008 United States Senate election in Alaska =

- November 4, 2008
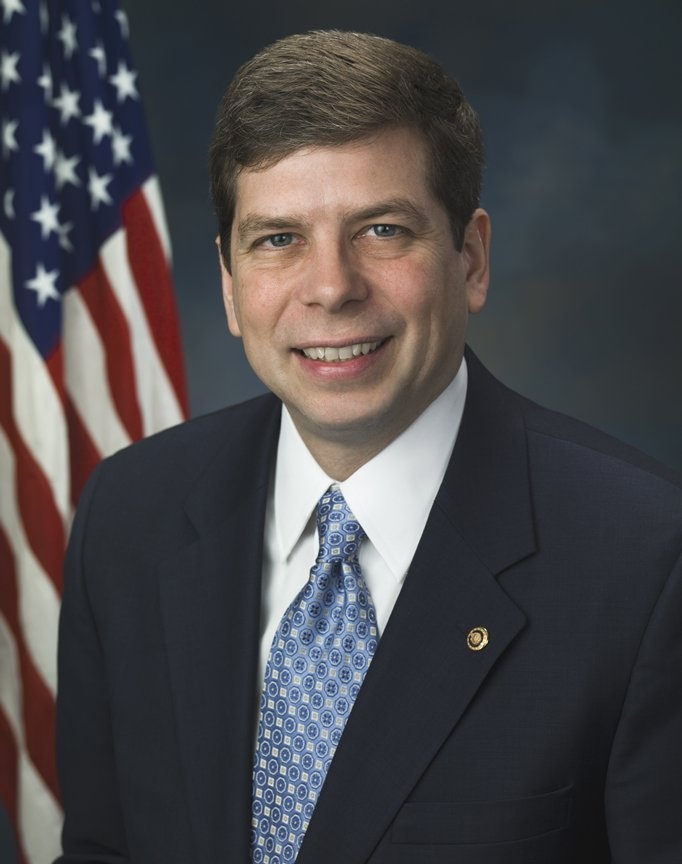

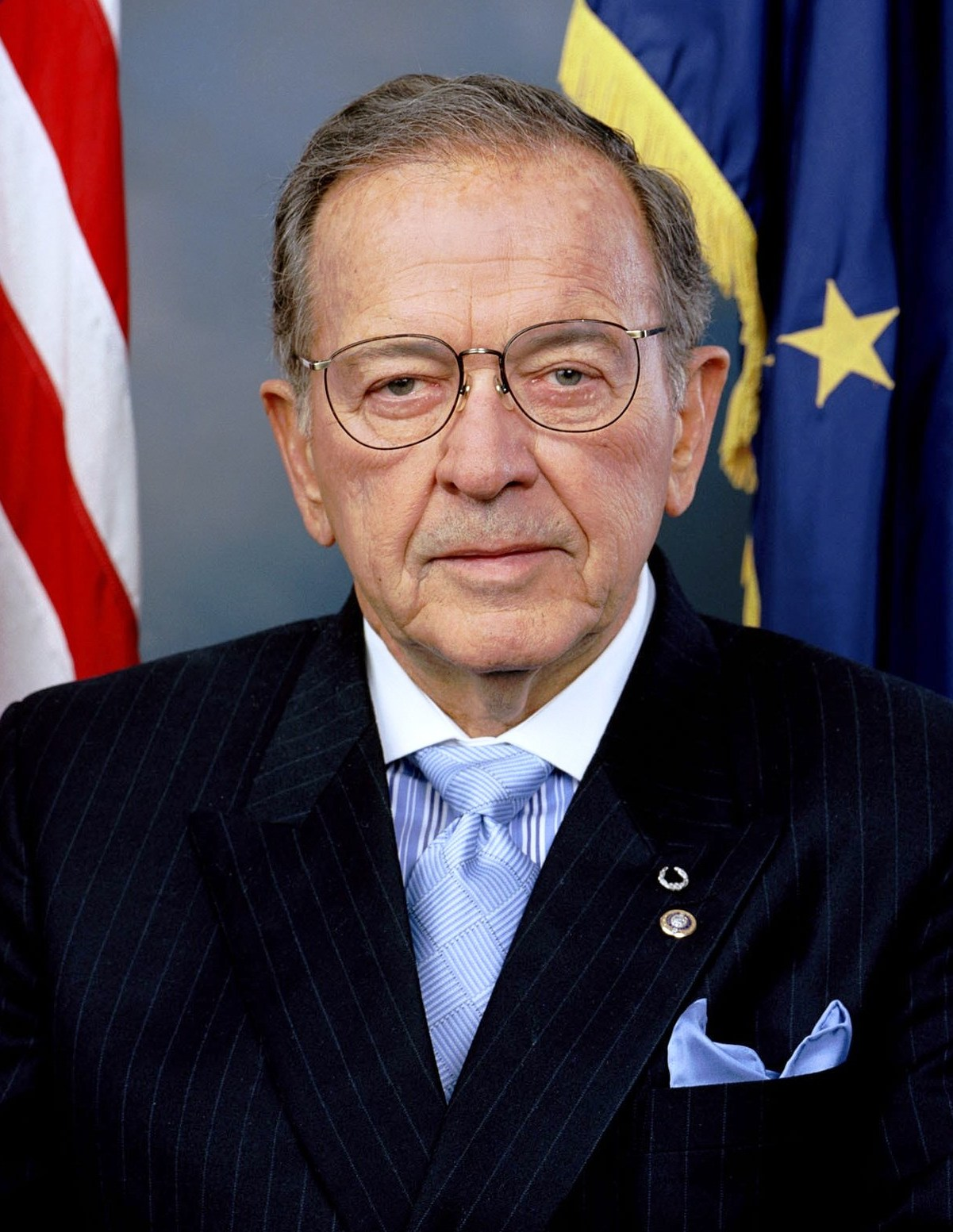
Nominee	Mark Begich	Ted Stevens
Party	Democratic	Republican
Popular vote	151,767	147,814
Percentage	47.77%	46.52%
- Borough and census area results Begich: 40–50% 50–60% 60–70% Stevens: 40–50% 50–60% 60–70%
U.S. senator before election
Ted Stevens
Republican
Elected U.S. Senator
Mark Begich
Democratic

The 2008 United States Senate election in Alaska was held on November 4, 2008. Incumbent Republican Senator and former President pro tempore of the Senate Ted Stevens ran for re-election for an eighth term (a seventh full term). It was one of the 10 Senate races that year that Senator John Ensign of Nevada, the chairman of the National Republican Senatorial Committee, predicted as being most competitive. The primaries were held on August 26, 2008. Stevens was challenged by Democratic candidate Mark Begich, the mayor of Anchorage and son of former U.S. Representative Nick Begich Sr.

On October 27, 2008, Stevens was convicted on seven charges of ethics violations and corruption. If re-elected, he would have been the first convicted felon to be elected to the United States Senate. On November 19, Stevens conceded, a day after the Associated Press called the election for Begich. Stevens became the longest serving senator to ever lose re-election, surpassing the previous record set by Warren Magnuson's loss to Slade Gorton in 1980.

Begich was the only Democrat in 2008 to flip a Senate seat in a state that Barack Obama lost to John McCain in the concurrent presidential race. With a margin of 1.3%, this election was the second-closest race of the 2008 Senate election cycle, behind only the election in Minnesota. This was the first time since 1966 that a Democrat won Alaska's Class 2 Senate seat, and the first time since 1974 and last time until 2026 that a Democrat won any Alaska U.S. Senate election. Democrats did not win another statewide election in Alaska until the August 2022 special election when Mary Peltola was elected to the U.S. House of Representatives. This was also the first time Alaska voted for candidates of different political parties for U.S. senator and president since Democrat Mike Gravel was re-elected as Republican Richard Nixon carried the state in 1968.

Stevens's conviction was set aside in April 2009, and the U.S. attorney general dropped all charges against him, citing serious prosecutorial misconduct during the trial. On August 9, 2010, Stevens died in a plane crash.

== Democratic–Libertarian–Independence primary ==
The ADL ballot contained all of the primary candidates for the Alaska Democratic Party, the Alaskan Independence Party, and the Libertarian Party of Alaska.

=== Candidates ===
==== Alaskan Independence ====
- Bob Bird

==== Democratic ====
- Mark Begich, Anchorage Mayor
- Ray Metcalfe, former State Representative and founder of the Republican Moderate Party of Alaska
- Frank Vondersaar, perennial candidate

==== Libertarian ====
- Fredrick David Haase

=== Results ===
Democratic–Libertarian–Independence primary results
Party	Candidate	Votes	%
Democratic	Mark Begich	63,747	84.12%
Democratic	Ray Metcalfe	5,480	7.23%
Independence	Bob Bird	4,216	5.56%
Libertarian	Fredrick Haase	1,375	1.81%
Democratic	Frank Vondersaar	965	1.27%
Total votes		75,783	100.00%

== Republican primary ==
=== Candidates ===
- Michael Corey, judge, attorney
- David Cuddy, former State Representative
- Gerald Heikes, minister
- Rick Sikma, pastor
- Ted Stevens, incumbent U.S. Senator since 1968
- Vic Vickers, former assistant State Comptroller
- Richard Wanda

=== Campaign ===
With three and a half weeks to go before the primary, Stevens still held a large polling lead over chief rival Dave Cuddy, 59% to 19%. Political newcomer Vic Vickers said on July 28 that he expected to pour $750,000 of his own money into his bid to defeat Stevens. According to Rasmussen polling of Alaskans, Cuddy "does nearly as well against Begich" as Stevens, trailing Begich 50% to 35%, while Vickers trailed the expected Democratic nominee 55% to 22%.

=== Results ===
In the Republican primary on August 26, results from 70.5% of precincts showed Stevens winning with 63% of the vote; Cuddy had 28% and Vickers had 6%.

Republican primary results
Party	Candidate	Votes	%
Republican	Ted Stevens (incumbent)	66,900	63.52%
Republican	David Cuddy	28,364	26.93%
Republican	Vic Vickers	6,102	5.79%
Republican	Michael Corey	1,496	1.42%
Republican	Roderic Sikma	1,133	1.08%
Republican	Rich Wanda	732	0.69%
Republican	Gerald Heikes	599	0.57%
Total votes		105,326	100.00%

== General election ==
=== Candidates ===
==== Major ====
- Mark Begich (D), Mayor of Anchorage
- Ted Stevens (R), incumbent U.S. Senator since 1968

==== Minor ====
- Bob Bird (AI)
- Fredrick "David" Haase (L)
- Ted Gianoutsos (I)

=== Campaign ===
The FBI investigation and subsequent seven-count indictment of Ted Stevens, as well as the investigation of the state's only Representative, Don Young (R), generated some negative feelings in Alaska towards Republicans, even among Republican primary voters. Anchorage Mayor Mark Begich (son of the last Democratic Rep. from Alaska, Nick Begich) was courted by both the Democratic Congressional Campaign Committee and the Democratic Senatorial Campaign Committee. In February 2008, he announced the formation of an exploratory committee for the Senate seat. The possible Democratic field also included former Governor Tony Knowles, State Rep. Eric Croft and State Senators Hollis French and Johnny Ellis. Former Minority Leader of the Alaska House of Representatives Ethan Berkowitz was considered a possible candidate, but he decided to challenge Don Young instead. Sensing discontentment within the GOP, conservative Republican Dave Cuddy announced his candidacy for U.S. Senate in December 2007.

Stevens was perceived by many as corrupt, but was also highly regarded by many Alaskans for his ability to steer federal funding toward the state; he was the longest-serving Republican in the Senate entering 2008 (first elected in 1968), and through his seniority, he amassed a great deal of influence there. The selection of Alaskan Governor Sarah Palin as the vice-presidential running-mate of Republican presidential candidate John McCain in late August 2008 coincided with a substantial improvement in Stevens' performance in opinion polls. A poll in August showed Begich with a 17% lead, but in early September a poll from the same source showed Begich leading Stevens by only 3%. Begich's campaign and some observers attributed this change to Palin's popularity and the enthusiasm stimulated by her selection, although Palin's reputation was partially based on her perceived opposition to Stevens or distance from him.

The Stevens campaign disputed the low numbers shown in the August poll and said that the numbers had improved in September because Stevens had begun heavily campaigning. His campaign also presented the relationship between Palin and Stevens as positive, contrary to some portrayals. Stevens was convicted of seven felony counts of failing to report gifts on October 27, 2008. This was considered a serious setback in his already difficult bid for re-election; he had requested and received a quick trial in hopes of winning an acquittal before election day. After the verdict, Stevens maintained his innocence and said that he was still running for re-election.

=== Predictions ===
Source	Ranking	As of
The Cook Political Report	Lean D (flip)	October 23, 2008
CQ Politics	Lean D (flip)	October 31, 2008
Rothenberg Political Report	Lean D (flip)	November 2, 2008
Real Clear Politics	Lean D (flip)	October 30, 2008

=== Polling ===
Poll source	Date(s) administered	Mark Begich (D)	Ted Stevens (R)
Research 2000	December 3–6, 2007	47%	41%
Rasmussen Reports	April 7, 2008	45%	46%
DSCC	May 6–10, 2008	51%	44%
Research 2000	May 12–14, 2008	48%	43%
Rasmussen Reports	May 14, 2008	47%	45%
Rasmussen Reports	June 16, 2008	44%	46%
Research 2000	July 14–16, 2008	47%	45%
Rasmussen Reports	July 17, 2008	52%	44%
Rasmussen Reports	July 30, 2008	50%	37%
Ivan Moore Research	July 31, 2008	56%	35%
Ivan Moore Research	August 30 – September 2, 2008	49%	46%
Rasmussen Reports	September 9, 2008	48%	46%
Research 2000	September 15–17, 2008	50%	44%
Rasmussen Reports	October 6, 2008	48%	49%
Research 2000	October 14–16, 2008	48%	46%
Rasmussen Reports	October 28, 2008	52%	44%
Research 2000	October 28–30, 2008	58%	36%

=== Results ===
Begich won the election by 3,953 votes. Incumbent Stevens had held a lead of over 3,000 votes after election night, but a tally of nearly 60,000 absentee and mail-in ballots released on November 12 erased that lead and reduced the vote margin separating the candidates to less than 0.5%, with further counting, released on November 18, increasing the margin to more than 1% in favor of Begich. On November 19, 2008, Stevens conceded to Begich.

2008 United States Senate election in Alaska
Party	Candidate	Votes	%
Democratic	Mark Begich	151,767	47.77%
Republican	Ted Stevens (incumbent)	147,814	46.52%
Independence	Bob Bird	13,197	4.15%
Libertarian	Fredrick Haase	2,483	0.78%
Independent	Ted Gianoutsos	1,385	0.44%
Write-in		1,077	0.34%
Total votes		317,723	100.00%
Democratic gain from Republican			

==== Boroughs and census areas that flipped from Republican to Democratic ====
- Aleutians West Census Area (largest city: Unalaska)
- Anchorage
- Bethel Census Area (largest city: Bethel)
- Denali Borough (largest city: Healy)
- Kusilvak Census Area (largest city: Hooper Bay)
- Nome Census Area (largest city: Nome)
- Dilingham Census Area (largest city: Dilingham)
- Fairbanks North Star (largest city: Fairbanks)
- Kodiak Island (largest city: Kodiak Island)
- Lake & Peninsula Borough (largest city: Newhalen)
- North Slope Borough (largest city: Utqiaġvik)
- Northwest Arctic Borough (largest city: Kotzebue)
- Prince of Wales–Hyder Census Area (largest city: Craig)
- Yukon–Koyukuk Census Area (largest city: Fort Yukon)
- Juneau
- Sitka
- Skagway
- Hoonah–Angoon Census Area (largest town: Hoonah)
- Petersburg
- Haines Borough (largest census-designated place: Haines)
- Yakutat

== See also ==
- 2008 United States Senate elections
- List of United States senators from Alaska
