= 1968 United States Senate election in Alaska =

- November 5, 1968
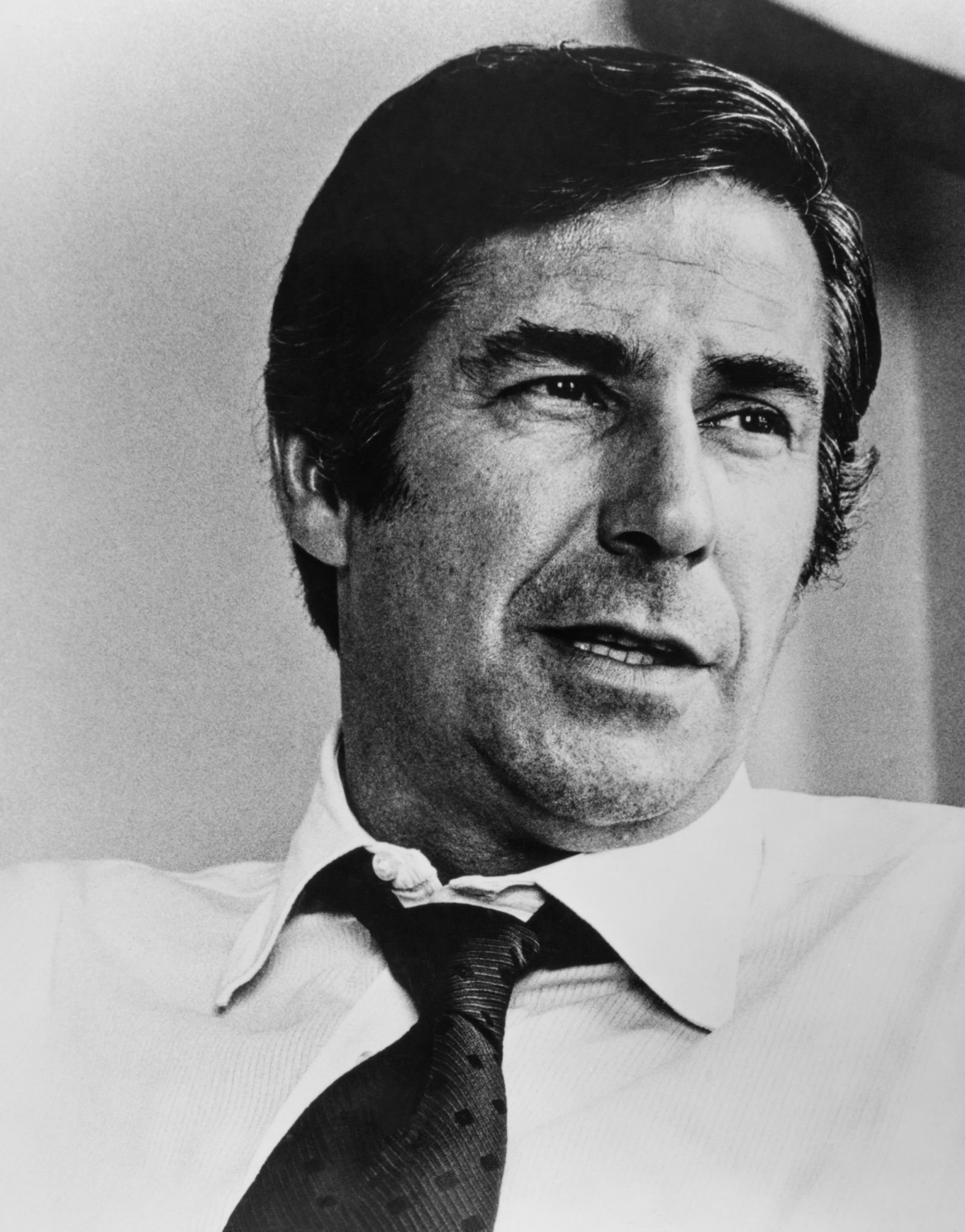

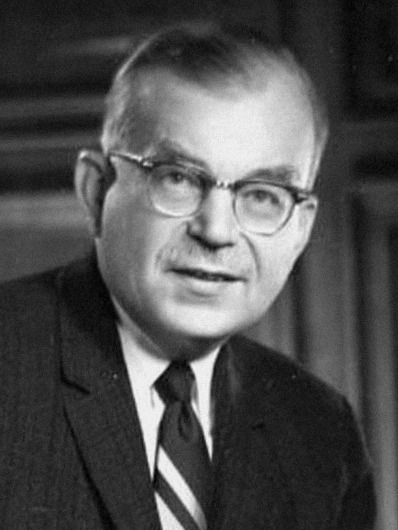

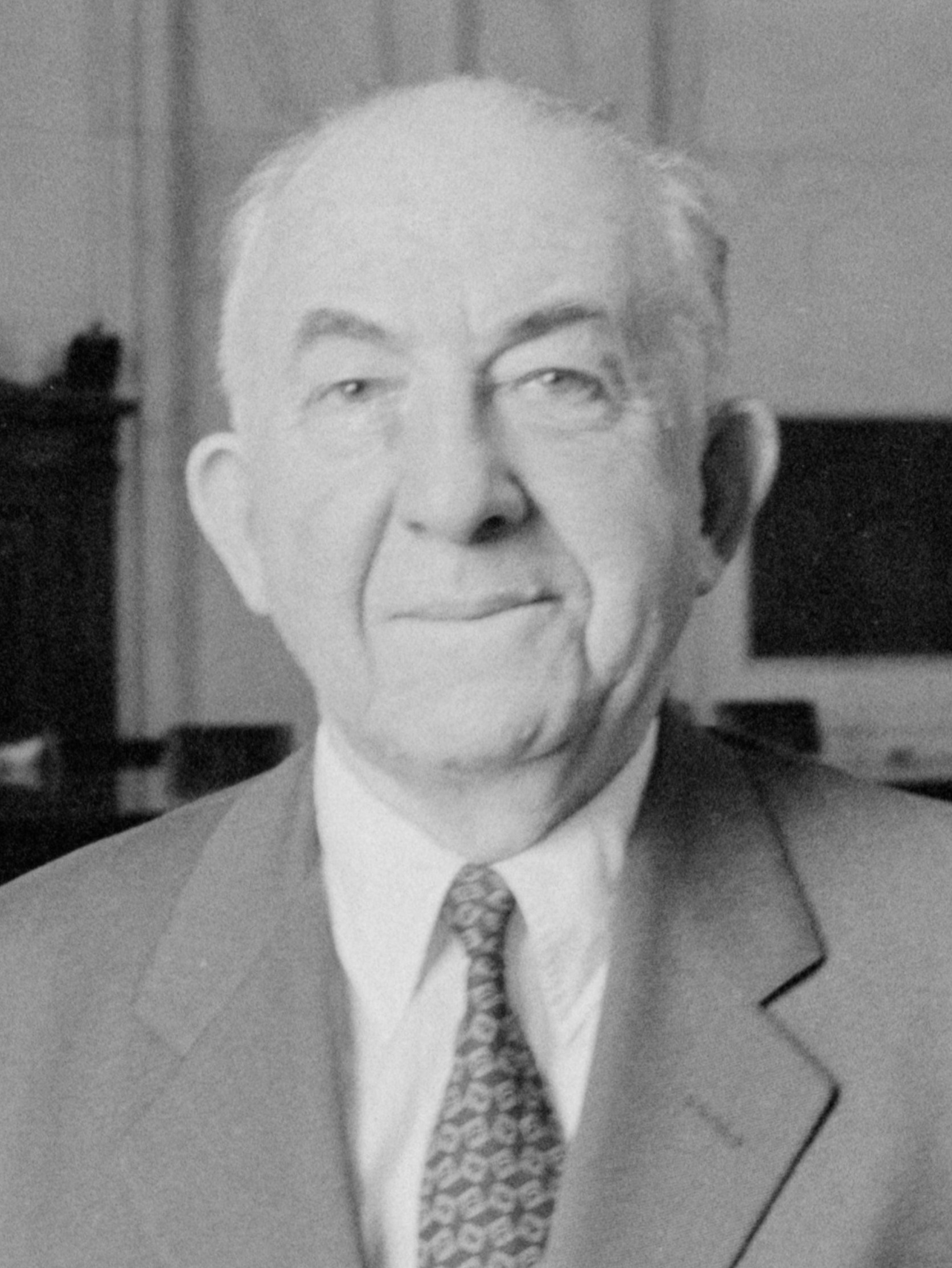
Nominee	Mike Gravel	Elmer Rasmuson	Ernest Gruening (write-in)
Party	Democratic	Republican	Democratic
Popular vote	36,527	30,286	14,118
Percentage	45.13%	37.42%	17.44%
- Gravel: 40–50% 50–60% 60–70% Rasmuson: 40–50% Gruening: 30–40%
U.S. senator before election
Ernest Gruening
Democratic
Elected U.S. Senator
Mike Gravel
Democratic

The 1968 United States Senate election in Alaska took place on November 5, 1968. Incumbent Democratic U.S. Senator Ernest Gruening ran for a second full term in office but finished behind Speaker of the Alaska House of Representatives Mike Gravel in the Democratic primary. Gruening launched a write-in bid for the seat in the general election, but finished third to Gravel and Republican former Anchorage mayor Elmer Rasmuson.

Gravel would later lose the primary in 1980 to Gruening's grandson Clark.

This would be the first of 3 times where the incumbent holder of Alaska's Class 3 U.S. Senate seat was defeated in the primary while running for re-election.

Future Senator Ted Stevens also ran in the Republican primary, but lost to Rasmuson by around 1,000 votes. When incumbent Democratic Class 2 Senator Bob Bartlett died that December, Governor Wally Hickel appointed Stevens to the vacant seat, giving Stevens a seniority advantage of 10 days over the incoming Gravel.

== Primary election ==
=== Democratic ===
Gravel ran against 81-year-old incumbent Democratic United States Senator Ernest Gruening, a popular former governor of the Alaska Territory who was considered one of the fathers of Alaska's statehood, for his party's nomination to the U.S. Senate. Gravel's campaign was primarily based on his youth and telegenic appearance rather than issue differences. He hired Joseph Napolitan, the first self-described political consultant, in late 1966. They spent over a year and a half planning a short, nine-day primary election campaign that featured the slogans "Alaska first" and "Let's do something about the state we're in", the distribution of a collection of essays titled Jobs and More Jobs, and the creation of a half-hour, well-produced, glamorized biographical film of Gravel, A Man for Alaska. The film was shown twice a day on every television station in Alaska, and carried by plane and shown on home projectors in hundreds of Alaska Native villages. The heavy showings quickly reversed a 2–to–1 Gruening lead in polls into a Gravel lead. Gravel visited many remote villages by seaplane and showed a thorough understanding of the needs of the bush country and the fishing and oil industries.

Gravel also benefited from maintaining a deliberately ambiguous posture about Vietnam policy. Gruening had been one of only two senators to vote against the Gulf of Tonkin Resolution and his opposition to President Lyndon B. Johnson's war policies was harming him among the Democratic electorate; according to Gravel, "all I had to do was stand up and not deal with the subject, and people would assume that I was to the right of Ernest Gruening, when in point of fact I was to the left of him". In A Man for Alaska, Gravel argued that "the liberals" would come to West Germany's defense if it was attacked, and that they "should apply the same rule to Asians". During the campaign he also claimed that he was "more in the mainstream of American thought on Vietnam" than Gruening, despite the fact that he had written to Gruening to praise his antiwar stance four years earlier. Decades later, Gravel conceded that "I said what I said [about Vietnam] to advance my career."

Gravel beat Gruening in the primary by about 2,000 votes. Gruening found "the unexpected defeat hard to take" and thought that some aspects of his opponent's biographical film had misled viewers.

==== Candidates ====
- Mike Gravel, former State Representative and Speaker of the Alaska House of Representatives from Anchorage
- Ernest Gruening, incumbent U.S. Senator since 1959

===== Results =====
U.S. Senate Democratic primary results
Party	Candidate	Votes	%
Democratic	Mike Gravel	17,971	52.9
Democratic	Ernest Gruening (incumbent)	16,015	47.1
Total votes		33,986	100.00

=== Republican ===
- Elmer Rasmuson, former Mayor of Anchorage and member of the University of Alaska Board of Regents
- Ted Stevens, State Representative from Anchorage, State House Majority Leader, former Solicitor of the Interior and nominee for Senate in 1962

==== Results ====
U.S. Senate Republican primary results
Party	Candidate	Votes	%
Republican	Elmer Rasmuson	10,320	53.1
Republican	Ted Stevens	9,111	46.9
Total votes		19,431	100.00

== General election ==
In the general election, Gravel faced Republican Elmer E. Rasmuson, a banker and former mayor of Anchorage. College students in the state implored Gruening to run a write-in campaign as an Independent, but legal battles prevented him from getting approval for it until only two weeks were left. A late appearance by anti-war presidential candidate Eugene McCarthy did not offset Gruening's lack of funds and endorsements; meanwhile, Gravel and Rasmuson both saturated local media with their filmed biographies. On November 5, 1968, Gravel won the general election with 45 percent of the vote to Rasmuson's 37 percent and Gruening's 18 percent.

=== Results ===
1968 United States Senate election in Alaska
Party	Candidate	Votes	%	±%
Democratic	Mike Gravel	36,527	45.13%	
Republican	Elmer Rasmuson	30,286	37.42%	
Write-in	Ernest Gruening (incumbent)	14,118	17.44%	
Total votes		80,931	100.00%	
Democratic hold		Swing		

== See also ==
- 1968 United States Senate elections
- 1968 United States House of Representatives election in Alaska
