= David R. Daines =

American lawyer

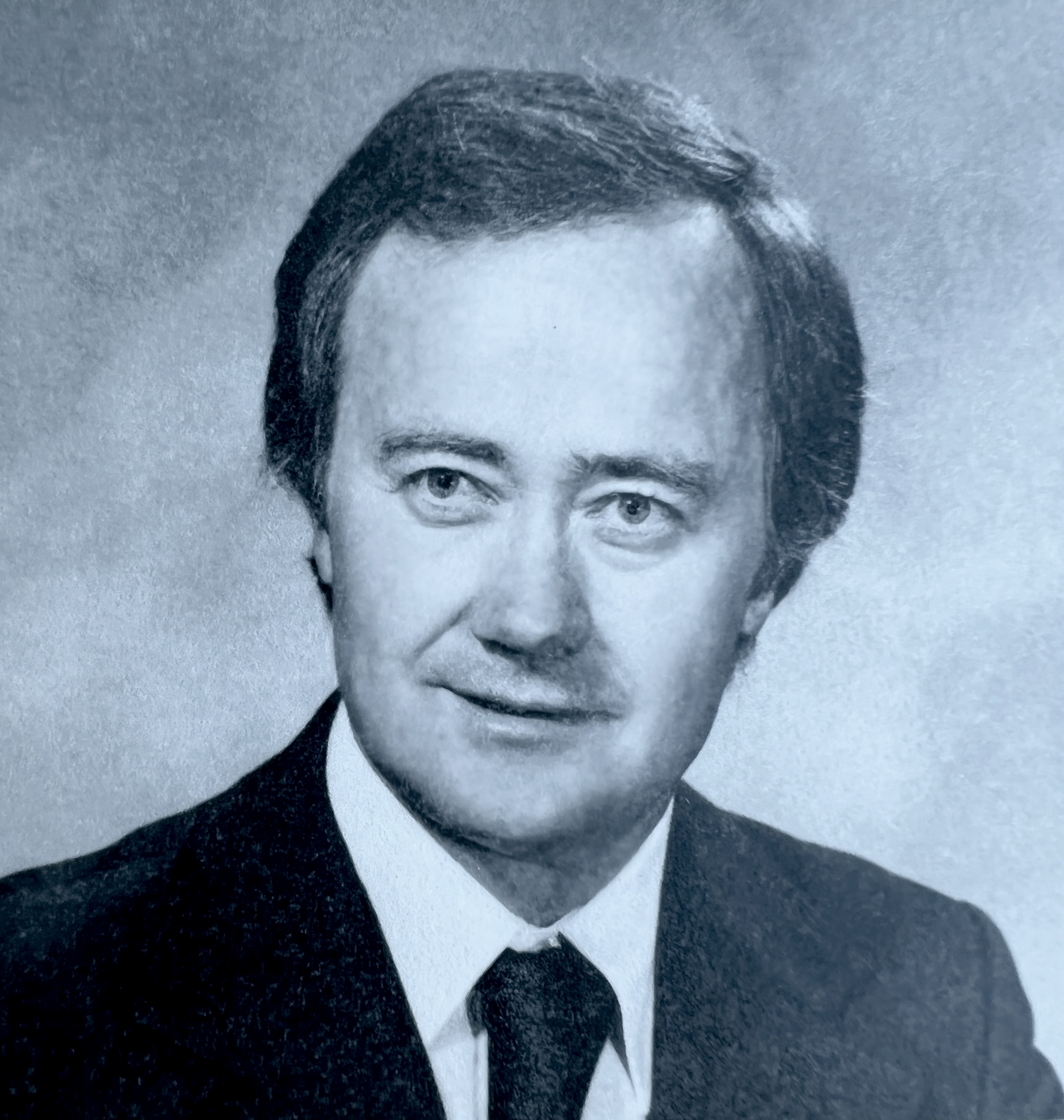
David Rainey Daines

David Rainey Daines (born March 23, 1932) was the youngest federal judge in U.S. history—appointed at just 23 to the position of deputy United States commissioner in Territorial Anchorage Alaska during the Eisenhower administration. As of 2023, at 91, Daines is also likely the last surviving federal judge appointed during that administration, and continues practicing law more than 65 years after his service as commissioner.

== Background ==
Following Alaska being granted statehood in 1958, Daines resigned to pursue private practice. He would later serve as a District Attorney in [Utah's First Judicial District], and as a professor of water law, business law and ethics at Utah State University.

== Professional career ==
=== Early career (1955–1967) ===
A year after Daines' appointment to deputy commissioner in 1955, he was appointed as the commissioner, and served in that capacity until 1958 when Alaska was granted statehood. Daines resigned in 1958 to start a private law practice, and ran unsuccessfully as a Republican candidate for one of the eleven new State House of Representative seats for Anchorage, coming in third among Republican candidates. All eleven Anchorage seats in the first State House of Representatives were won by Democrats in a statewide landslide.

Following the passing of his father in 1959, Daines returned to Logan, Utah, to take over his father's law practice. He ran successfully for district attorney for Utah's First Judicial District in a primary contest against the incumbent Republican. He was uncontested in the general election and took office in January, 1961. He served in that capacity until 1967, when in the middle of his second, uncontested four-year term as district attorney, he resigned to join the faculty at USU as a tenured professor of business law.

=== Academic career (1967–2006) ===
In 1969, as associate professor at USU, he began service in USAID's War on Hunger program as a water law and institutions specialist and also became USU's first professor of water law. Much of that service was in the Andean Region (Colombia, Ecuador, Peru, Bolivia, Chile) where he organized and directed the Andean Water Law Seminar of 1974, principally authored "Water Legislation in The Andean Pact Countries" 1974, consulted in drafting the 1974 Ecuador Water Code, designed and directed a survey of over 100 water-user organizations in four Andean countries, and served on the commission for the development of an international river between Ecuador and Peru. His work in the War on Hunger program also included serving as a member of the organizing committee of the first Global Water Law Systems conference in Valencia, Spain in 1975. He co-authored and co-presented "Water Law and Administration in The United States of America" for the conference. In the early 1980s he authored and directed the production of an irrigation training audio/video series at USU.

== Bibliography ==
Daines, David Rainey; Gonzalo, Falconi (1974). Water Legislation in the Andean Pact Countries (in English / Spanish). Logan, Utah: Utah State University Press. p. 258. ISBN 0874210666.

Daines, David Rainey (1976). Water Law and Administration in the United States of America (Vol. II ed.). Fort Collins: Colorado State University. pp. 453–502.

Daines, David R.; Radosevich, George E. (1976). Overview of Water Law in the United States. University of Nebraska.

Daines, David R (1987). Visual Irrigation Training Modules with Sound Enhancements. Copyright PAu 1-069-556 (owned by Brigham Young University).
