= Bob Bartlett =

Democratic U.S. Senator from Alaska

- Bartlett in 1954

United States Senator from Alaska
- In office January 3, 1959 – December 11, 1968
- Preceded by: William A. Egan (Shadow Senator)
- Succeeded by: Ted Stevens

Delegate to the U.S. House of Representatives from Alaska's at-large district
- In office January 3, 1945 – January 3, 1959
- Preceded by: Anthony Dimond
- Succeeded by: Ralph Rivers (Representative)

Secretary of Alaska Territory
- In office January 30, 1939 – February 6, 1944
- Governor: John Weir Troy; Ernest Gruening

Personal details
- Born: Edward Lewis Bartlett; April 20, 1904 Seattle, Washington, U.S.
- Died: December 11, 1968 (aged 64) Cleveland, Ohio, United States
- Party: Democratic
- Spouse: Vide Gaustad
- Children: 2
- Relatives: Burke Riley (son-in-law)
- Education: University of Washington, Seattle; University of Alaska, Fairbanks (BA)

Edward Lewis "Bob" Bartlett (April 20, 1904 – December 11, 1968), was an American politician and a member of the Democratic Party. He served as a United States Senator. A key fighter for Alaska statehood, Bartlett served as the Secretary of Alaska Territory from 1939 to 1945, as Alaska's delegate in Congress from 1945 to 1959, and as a U.S. senator from 1959 until his death in 1968. He was opposed to U.S. involvement in Vietnam, along with his fellow Senator Ernest Gruening, and also worked to warn people about the dangers of radiation. Many acts bear his name, including a major law known as the Bartlett Act, mandating handicap access in all federally funded buildings.

In 1939, President Franklin D. Roosevelt appointed him Secretary of the Alaska Territory, serving under Governors John Weir Troy and Ernest Gruening. In 1945, following the retirement of Anthony Dimond, Bartlett was elected as the delegate from Alaska to the 79th and the six succeeding Congresses, with the backing of Dimond. It was in this role that his greatest work on Alaskan statehood was completed, such as the introduction of the Alaska Statehood Act to the House, where he was key in shepherding its passage. Bartlett labored constantly for statehood, being a member of the Alaska Statehood Committee.

Upon Alaska's admission to the Union in 1959, he became the senior inaugural U.S. senator from Alaska and served until his death in 1968.

== Early life ==
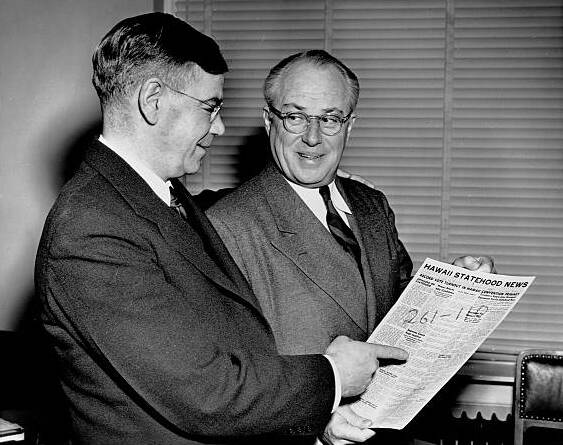
Bartlett with Hawaii Delegate Joe Farrington in 1950

Bartlett was born in Seattle, Washington, as Edward Lewis Bartlett. Bartlett's elder sister, Doris, insisted on calling the young Bartlett 'Bob', which became a name that stuck for life. After attending the University of Washington from 1922 to 1924, Bartlett graduated from the University of Alaska in 1925.

== Career ==
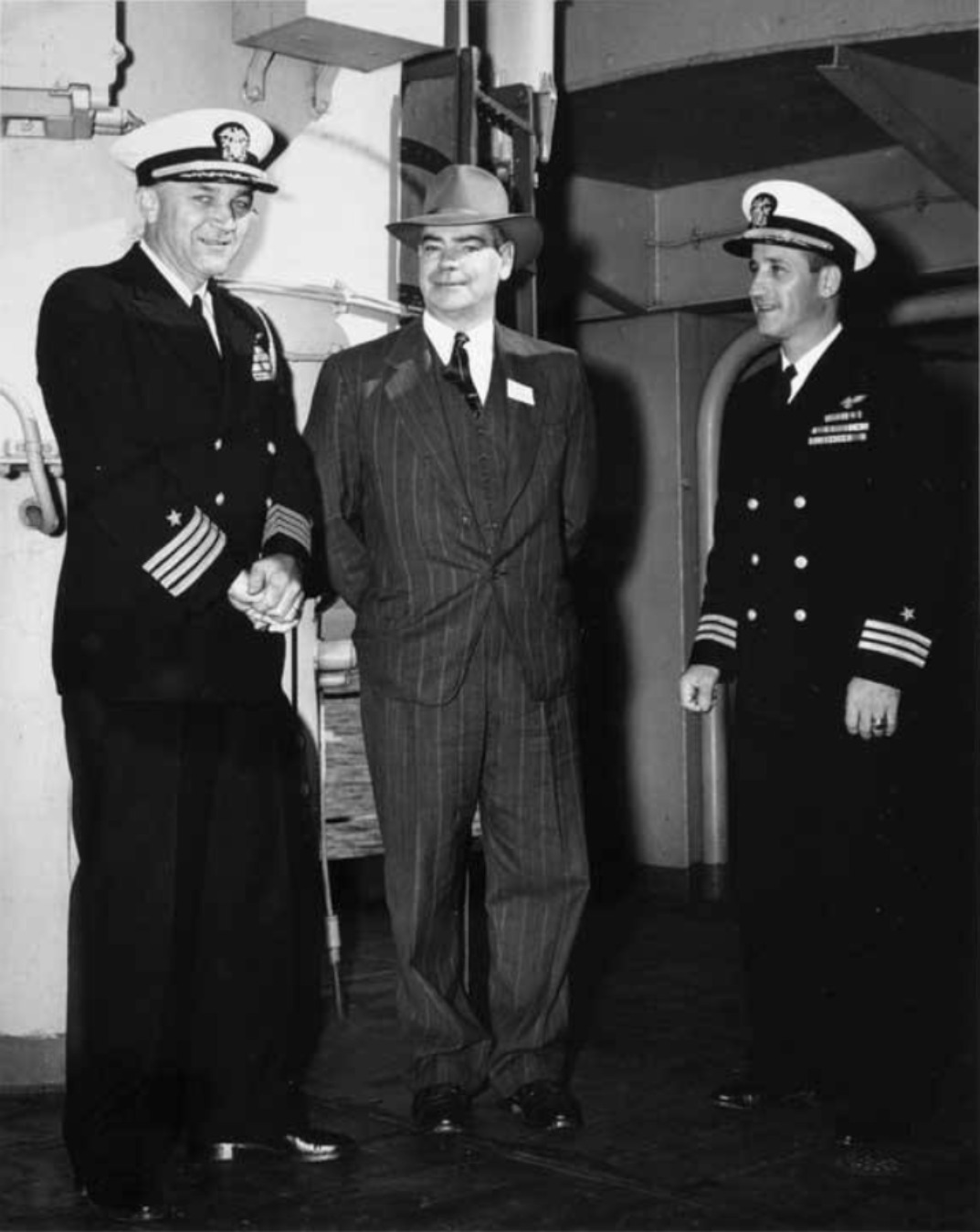
Bartlett on the USS Midway

Shortly after his graduation, Bartlett began his career in politics. A reporter for the Fairbanks Daily News from 1924 until 1933, he accepted the position of secretary to Delegate Anthony Dimond of Alaska, serving in that role for a year. Three years later, he became the chairman of the Unemployment Compensation Commission of Alaska, serving from 1937 to 1939.

Bartlett's father died in 1935, so he returned to Fairbanks to run his family's mining business. However, Bartlett wasn't a big fan of mining and looked back to the political arena in 1938.

On January 30, 1939, President Franklin D. Roosevelt appointed him secretary of the Alaska Territory, serving under Governors John Weir Troy in 1939 and Ernest Gruening from 1939 to 1944. Bartlett served as acting Governor multiple times, such as during the opening of the Alaska-Canada Highway.

In 1945, following the retirement of Anthony Dimond, Bartlett was elected as the delegate from Alaska to the 79th and the six succeeding Congresses, with the backing of Dimond. It was in this capacity that his greatest work on Alaskan statehood was completed, such as the introduction of the Alaska Statehood Act to the House. Continuing his civic service, he was president of the Alaska Tuberculosis Association and served as a member of the Alaska War Council, from 1942 to 1944.

Bartlett labored constantly for statehood, being a member of the Alaska Statehood Committee. Bartlett, as delegate, was the one who introduced the Alaska Statehood Act into Congress, being key in shepherding its passage.

Upon Alaska's admission to the Union in 1959, Bartlett became the senior inaugural U.S. senator from Alaska, along with junior Senator Ernest Gruening, with their senior-junior status determined by a coin flip. Bartlett served in this role until his death in office in 1968. He was succeeded by State Representative Ted Stevens, appointed by Governor Hickel, who had lost the Republican primary for Alaska's other Senate seat that year to former Anchorage Mayor Elmer Rasmuson. Stevens had also previously been the 1962 Republican nominee.

Bartlett possessed the reputation of a quiet man of achievement. The Library of Congress estimates that he had more bills passed into law than any other member in congressional history. Before statehood, he was writing legislation (sponsored by other congressional representatives), such as the Alaska Mental Health Enabling Act of 1956. Some of his bills included the Radiation Safety Bill and the Bartlett Act, requiring all federally funded buildings to be accessible to disabled people.

=== Career as a U.S. senator ===
Bartlett was elected as one of Alaska's inaugural Senators along with former Territorial Governor Ernest Gruening in 1958. On account of his service as a Delegate, Bartlett was nominated as the senior U.S. senator, a decision that upset Gruening, who challenged this; it led to a coinflip. Bartlett won the coinflip, which ended the dispute. A rivalry with Gruening made Bartlett nickname his colleague 'Junior' for the rest of his life.

A member of Bartlett's staff, David Price, later became a U.S. Representative from North Carolina.

In the 1968 Senate race, Bartlett's long-time colleague Ernest Gruening was defeated in the Democratic primary by Mike Gravel, former speaker of the Alaska House of Representatives. In the general election, Gruening and his supporters launched a write-in campaign against Gravel and the Republican nominee, former Anchorage mayor Elmer Rasumson, who had defeated 1962 nominee Ted Stevens in their primary. Gruening fully expected Bartlett's endorsement in the race, as they had worked together for nearly three decades. But in an official statement, Bartlett stated "On August 27th, Alaskans in the primary election chose Mike Gravel as Democratic candidate for the U.S. Senate over Ernest Gruening. The voters spoke." Bartlett went on to say, "I have put personal considerations aside in this decision. The time comes when a man must speak out. I speak out now! I support the Democratic majority. I support Mike Gravel." Gruening was devastated, and was mystified why Bartlett had endorsed Gravel over him.

=== 1964 Alaska earthquake ===
Following the 1964 Alaska earthquake, Bartlett was part of the inspection team, and he contributed to efforts to rebuild Anchorage, along with Governor Bill Egan, Representative Ralph Rivers and Senator Gruening. Bartlett & Gruening came into Alaska on Air Force One, thanks to Edward McDermott, Director of the Office of Emergency Planning. President Johnson declared Alaska a 'major disaster area'. Bartlett and Gruening reported the damage back to Johnson, where he sent federal aid.

=== Fight for Alaskan Statehood ===
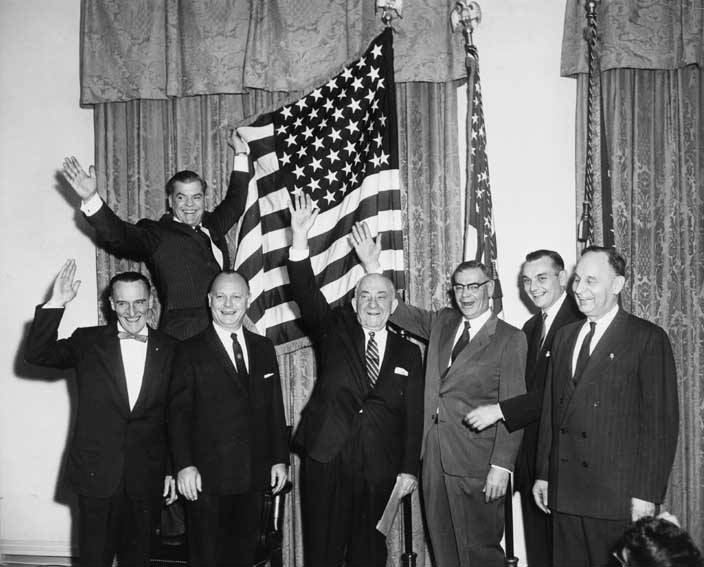
Bartlett, (bottom, third from right), celebrating Alaska Statehood next to a 49-star U.S. Flag, held by Robert Atwood.

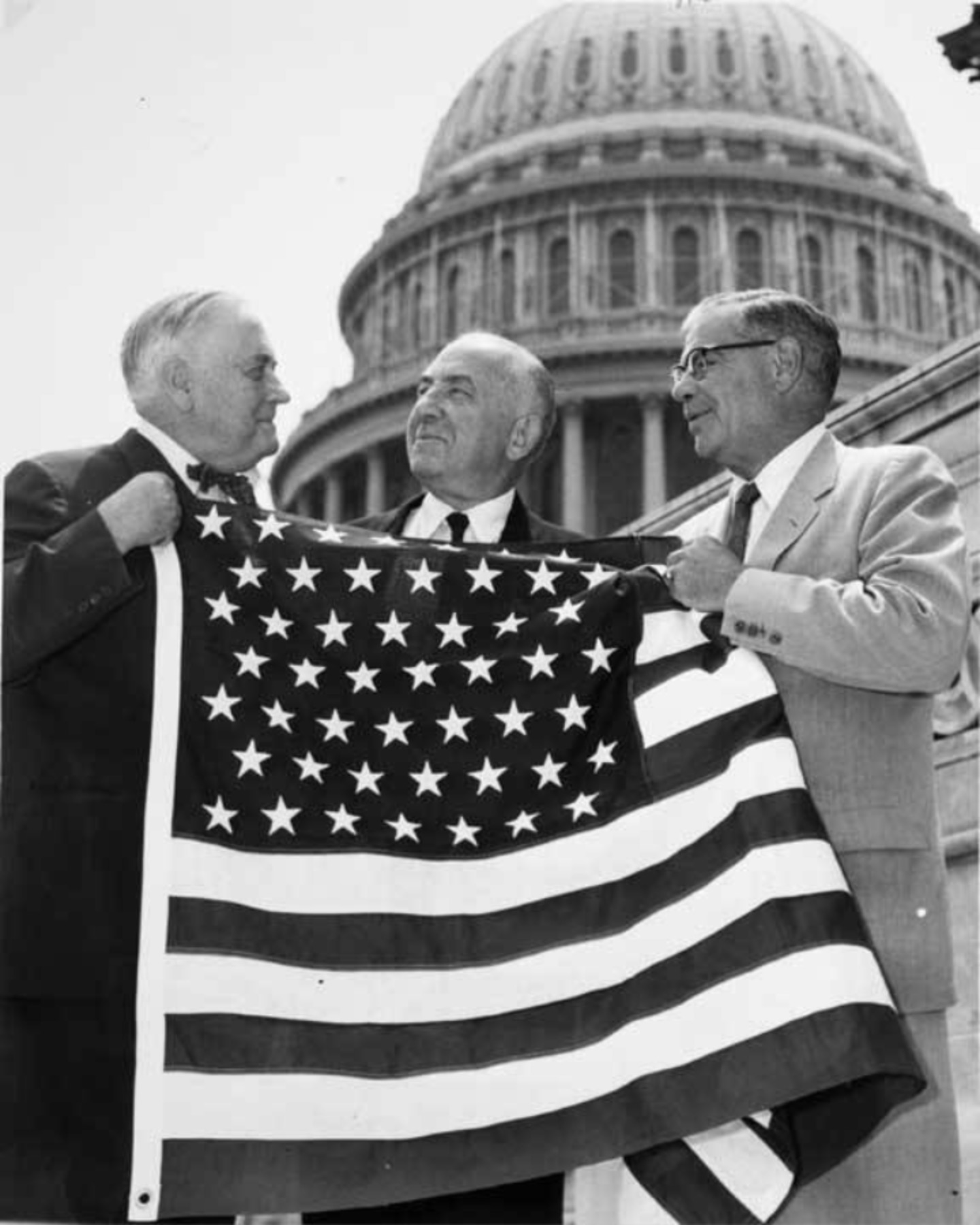
Bartlett and Ernest Gruening hold the 49-star U.S. flag after the admission of Alaska as the 49th state.

Bartlett first introduced the Alaska Statehood Act in 1947, although the bill was defeated.

Bartlett re-introduced the Alaska Statehood Act in 1950, with the backing of President Harry Truman, although, after passing the House of Representatives by a 40-vote margin, it was killed in committee in the Senate. Bartlett remained unfazed, and he called on Alaskans to join his fight for statehood. Alaskans responded with the 1956 constitutional convention, which elected Shadow U.S. Senators William A. Egan and Ernest Gruening, as well as Shadow U.S. Representative Ralph Rivers, all sworn in on October 6, 1956. The convention also created a state constitution for Alaska. The shadow Congressmen's main goal was to request or demand Alaskan statehood from the U.S. Congress. The Convention drew national attention to the fight for Alaskan Statehood. With the pressure from the convention and Bartlett, of whom members of Congress were very fond, congressmen and other federal politicians rapidly switched their opinions, most notably Sam Rayburn, the powerful Speaker of the House, Senate Majority Leader Lyndon B. Johnson, and President Dwight D. Eisenhower, all of whom had been courted by Bartlett, after previous opposition.

Bartlett was assisted by numerous Alaskans, such as Territorial Governor Mike Stepovich, who was present at the House vote, former Territorial Governor Ernest Gruening, and senior U.S. Department of the Interior official Ted Stevens, who was (illegally) using the Interior's offices to lobby for statehood. After talking to Stevens in 1958, Bartlett remarked in a letter to a friend "At a guess, I should say that many taxpayers' dollars are used for telephone calls to the Interior Department from Alaska and vice versa on matters more political than executive."

In 1958, the bill for Alaska Statehood was reintroduced, backed by Eisenhower, Johnson, and Rayburn. The main opponents of the bill were Republicans and Southern Democrats. Republicans feared that Alaska, a Democratic-leaning state, would elect Democrats to Congress. Southern Democrats feared that Alaska, a state with a high native population and that had passed one of the first laws against discrimination, would elect pro-civil rights Senators.

The bill would pass the House in April 1958, and defeat competition from powerful Virginia Representative and Chair of the House Rules Committee, Howard W. Smith, as well as Washington Representative Thomas Pelly. Bartlett used a powerful procedure, which had been omitted shortly after 1912 because Congress did not plan to add any more states after Arizona. However, the Library of Congress found that the procedure had never been formally abolished. The procedure would have allowed every single Representative to speak on the floor for an hour. Facing the possibility of more than 400 hours of debate, Smith and the other Representatives who were in opposition all backed down. Bartlett was key in shepherding the bill through the Senate, where it passed on June 30, 1958, by a vote of 64–20. Following this, the chamber broke into applause. Bartlett missed this, as he held the promise that he would call back home to Alaska if the bill passed. Bartlett was in his office, calling Alaskans, for most of the night.

President Eisenhower would sign the bill on July 7, 1958, and after the November 25th 1958 elections, in which nearly 80% of eligible Alaskans voted, Bartlett would be elected U.S. Senator, defeating R.E. Robertson. Bartlett would be inaugurated on January 3, 1959, the day that Alaska became a state. Bartlett's part in the Alaska Statehood Act was large, with Sam Rayburn summing up his change in opinion with: "Two words. Bob Bartlett."

== Personal life ==
=== Death ===
Bartlett was a heavy smoker throughout his life, and his health started to fail in the months leading up to his death, with Bartlett receiving treatment for heart ailments. His health failures, despite Bartlett's good spirits, became obvious in campaign ads for Gravel. Eventually, Bartlett and his family decided to get a coronary bypass surgery performed. After the surgery, Bartlett went into cardiac arrest multiple times, but he eventually started to slowly improve, before beginning to decline again. On December 11, 1968, at the age of 64, Bartlett died following the surgery at Cleveland Clinic Hospital in Cleveland, Ohio.

Bartlett died on the same day that Governor Walter Hickel was announced as President-elect Richard Nixon's nominee for U.S. Secretary of the Interior. However, the passing of a new law in the Alaska State Legislature let Hickel appoint a Senator from either political party. Bartlett was aware of that, and before the surgery, he left a notice to his physician reading, "Don't let your scalpel slip, because the law has changed, and the current Governor, Hickel, will appoint a Republican in my place." That made Hickel appoint the Republican nominee for the 1962 U.S. Senate race, Alaskan statehood activist & former senior executive official Ted Stevens to the seat. Stevens would serve for the following 40 years, serving as President pro tempore.

Bartlett's funeral was held on December 14. He was buried in Northern Lights Memorial Park, Fairbanks, Alaska. Bartlett staffer and state senator Joe Josephson reported that "In some funerals, you feel like people are there out of duty, or to show the flag, however, with Bartlett, it really felt like a friend was lost."

=== Family ===
On August 14, 1930, Bartlett married his long-time companion and childhood friend, Vide Gaustad, the daughter of local newspaperman & miner O.P. Gaustad, who was politically active. Their marriage was witnessed by Territorial Senator (and later territorial delegate to the U.S. House) Anthony Dimond, who helped Bartlett further his political career.

Bartlett's daughter, Doris Ann Bartlett, was a literature teacher at the University of Alaska Fairbanks. She also served as the UAF's librarian for the 1956 Alaska Constitutional Convention. She was born February 7, 1934, and she died in 2015.

Bartlett had another daughter, Susie Bernice Bartlett, on December 9, 1940.

=== Legacy ===
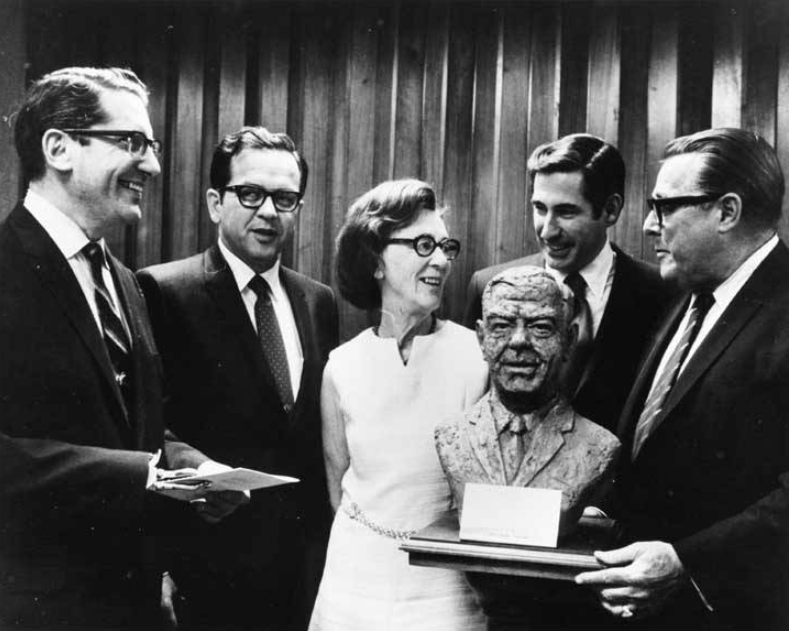
A picture of a bust of Bartlett on May 6, 1969. L-R: Congressman Howard Pollock, Senator Ted Stevens, Vide Bartlett, Senator Mike Gravel, Senator Warren Magnuson.

On March 27, 1971, the state of Alaska commissioned Felix de Weldon to create a bronze statue of Bartlett which resides in the National Statuary Hall Collection at the United States Capitol. The unveiling ceremony was opened by Alaska's senior U.S. Senator & Bartlett's successor, Ted Stevens. U.S. Senator from Washington Warren Magnuson, Rev. Edward L.R. Elson, U.S. Senator Mike Gravel, U.S. Representative Nick Begich, and Lieutenant Governor Red Boucher all spoke at the unveiling. Magnuson, in tribute, referred to Bartlett as Alaska's "Founding Father", while Rev. Elson praised Bartlett's "high vision, lofty idealism, prodigious energy and sacrificial devotion.", as well as lauding his "enduring statesmanship", and his many legislative & executive achievements.

A substantial number of buildings, place names and more have been named after Bartlett in Alaska over the years. The most notable of these include Bartlett Regional Hospital (originally St. Ann's Hospital, and known for a time as Bartlett Memorial Hospital), the hospital serving Juneau, Alaska, as well as Bartlett High School in Anchorage and Bartlett Hall at the University of Alaska Fairbanks.

== Electoral history ==
=== As delegate ===
District	Incumbent			This race (1944)	
District	Representative	Party	First elected	Results	Candidates
Alaska Territory at-large	Anthony Dimond	Democratic	1932	Incumbent retired to become a judge. New member elected September 13, 1944. Democratic hold.	✓ Bob Bartlett (Democratic) 65.84%; John E. Manders (Republican) 34.16%

District	Incumbent			This race (1946)	
District	Representative	Party	First elected	Results	Candidates
Alaska Territory at-large	Bob Bartlett	Democratic	1944	Incumbent re-elected.	✓ Bob Bartlett (Democratic) 70.29%; Almer J. Peterson (Republican) 29.71%

District	Incumbent			This race (1948)	
District	Representative	Party	First elected	Results	Candidates
Alaska Territory at-large	Bob Bartlett	Democratic	1944	Incumbent re-elected.	✓ Bob Bartlett (Democratic) 78.53%; R. H. Stock (Republican) 21.47%

District	Incumbent			This race (1950)	
District	Representative	Party	First elected	Results	Candidates
Alaska Territory at-large	Bob Bartlett	Democratic	1944	Incumbent re-elected.	✓ Bob Bartlett (Democratic) 72.56%; Almer J. Peterson (Republican) 27.44%

District	Incumbent			This race (1952)	
District	Representative	Party	First elected	Results	Candidates
Alaska Territory at-large	Bob Bartlett	Democratic	1944	Incumbent re-elected.	✓ Bob Bartlett (Democratic) 56.62%; Robert C. Reeve (Republican) 43.38%

District	Incumbent			This race (1954)	
District	Representative	Party	First elected	Results	Candidates
Alaska Territory at-large	Bob Bartlett	Democratic	1944	Incumbent re-elected.	✓ Bob Bartlett (Democratic) 19,916 (73.77%); Barbara D. Dimock (Republican) 7,083 (26.23%)

District	Incumbent			This race (1956)	
District	Representative	Party	First elected	Results	Candidates
Alaska Territory at-large	Bob Bartlett	Democratic	1944	Incumbent re-elected.	✓ Bob Bartlett (Democratic) 66.99%; Byron A. Gillam (Republican) 33.01%

=== As U.S. Senator ===
1958 U.S. Senate election in Alaska (Class 2)
Party	Candidate	Votes	%
Democratic	Bob Bartlett	40,939	83.83%
Republican	R. E. Robertson	7,299	14.95%
Independent	Keith Capper (write-in)	599	1.23%
Majority		33,640	68.88%
Turnout		48,837	
Democratic win (new seat)			

1960 U.S. Senate election in Alaska
Party	Candidate	Votes	%	±%
Democratic	Bob Bartlett (inc.)	38,041	63.43%	▼20.40
Republican	Lee McKinley	21,937	36.58%	▲21.63
Total votes		59,978	100.00%	

1966 U.S. Senate election in Alaska
Party	Candidate	Votes	%	±%
Democratic	Bob Bartlett (inc.)	49,289	75.54%	▲12.12
Republican	Lee McKinley	15,961	24.46%	▼12.12
Total votes		65,250	100.00%	

== See also ==
- List of members of the United States Congress who died in office (1950–1999)
- List of United States senators from Alaska

U.S. House of Representatives
Preceded by Anthony Dimond	Delegate to the U.S. House of Representatives from Alaska Territory's at-large congressional district 1945–1959	Succeeded by Ralph Rivers as Representative
Party political offices
First	Democratic nominee for U.S. Senator from Alaska (Class 2); 1958, 1960, 1966	Succeeded by Wendell Kay
U.S. Senate
Preceded by William A. Egan as Shadow Senator	U.S. Senator (Class 2) from Alaska; 1959–1968; Served alongside: Ernest Gruening	Succeeded by Ted Stevens
