= Statue of Ernest Gruening =

Ernest Gruening
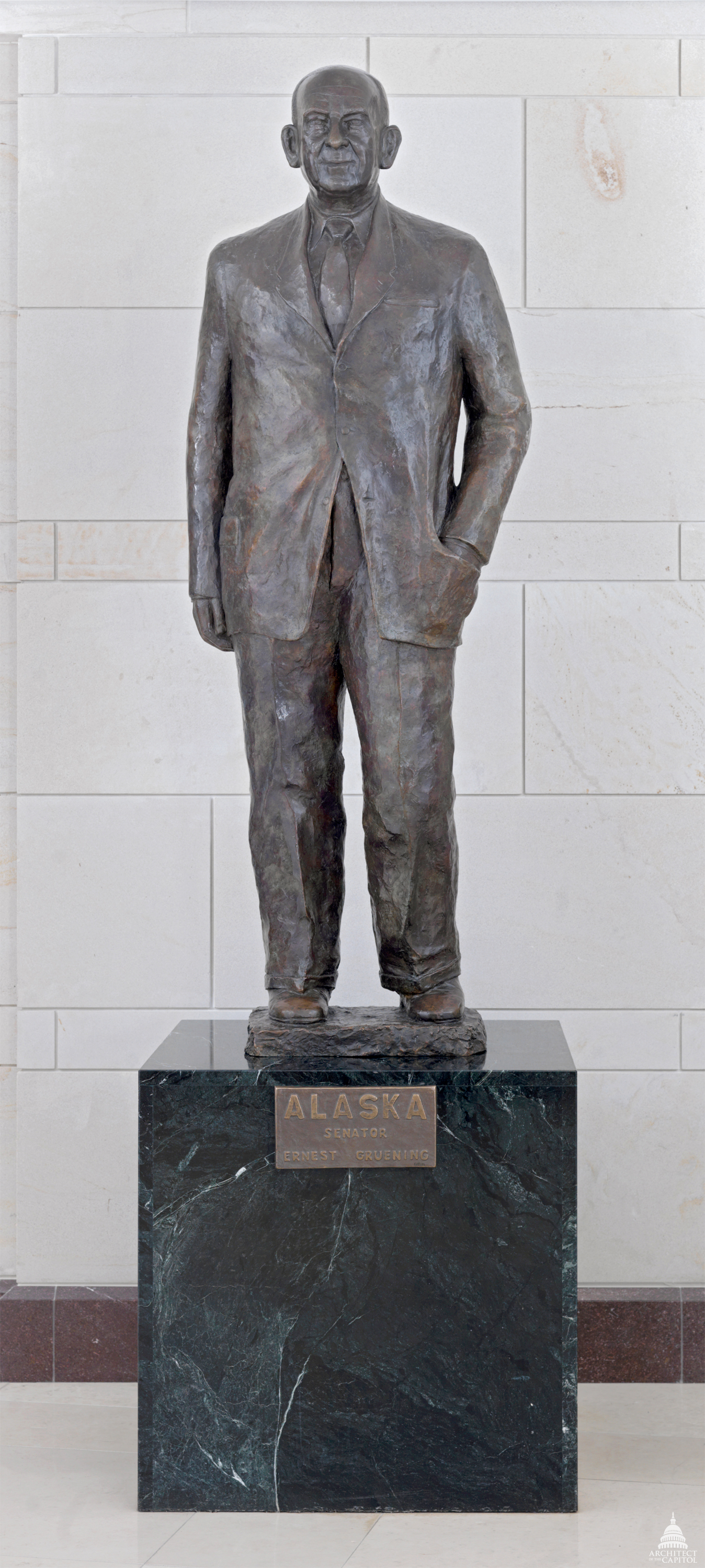
- Artist: George Anthonisen
- Medium: Bronze sculpture
- Subject: Ernest Gruening
- Location: Washington, D.C., United States

A bronze sculpture of an American journalist and politician Ernest Gruening by George Anthonisen is installed in the United States Capitol Visitor Center, in Washington, D.C., as part of the National Statuary Hall Collection. The statue was gifted by the U.S. state of Alaska in 1977.
