= Statue of Bob Bartlett =

Sculpture by Felix de Weldon

Edward Lewis ("Bob") Bartlett
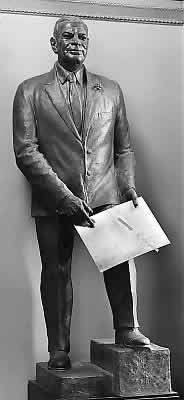
- The statue in the National Statuary Hall Collection
- Artist: Felix de Weldon
- Medium: Bronze sculpture
- Subject: Bob Bartlett
- Location: Washington, D.C., United States

A bronze statue of the American politician Edward Lewis ("Bob") Bartlett by Felix de Weldon is installed at the United States Capitol in Washington, D.C., as part of the National Statuary Hall Collection. The statue was gifted by the U.S. state of Alaska in 1971.

The statue is one of three that De Weldon has had placed in the Collection.
