= 1962 United States Senate election in Alaska =

- November 6, 1962
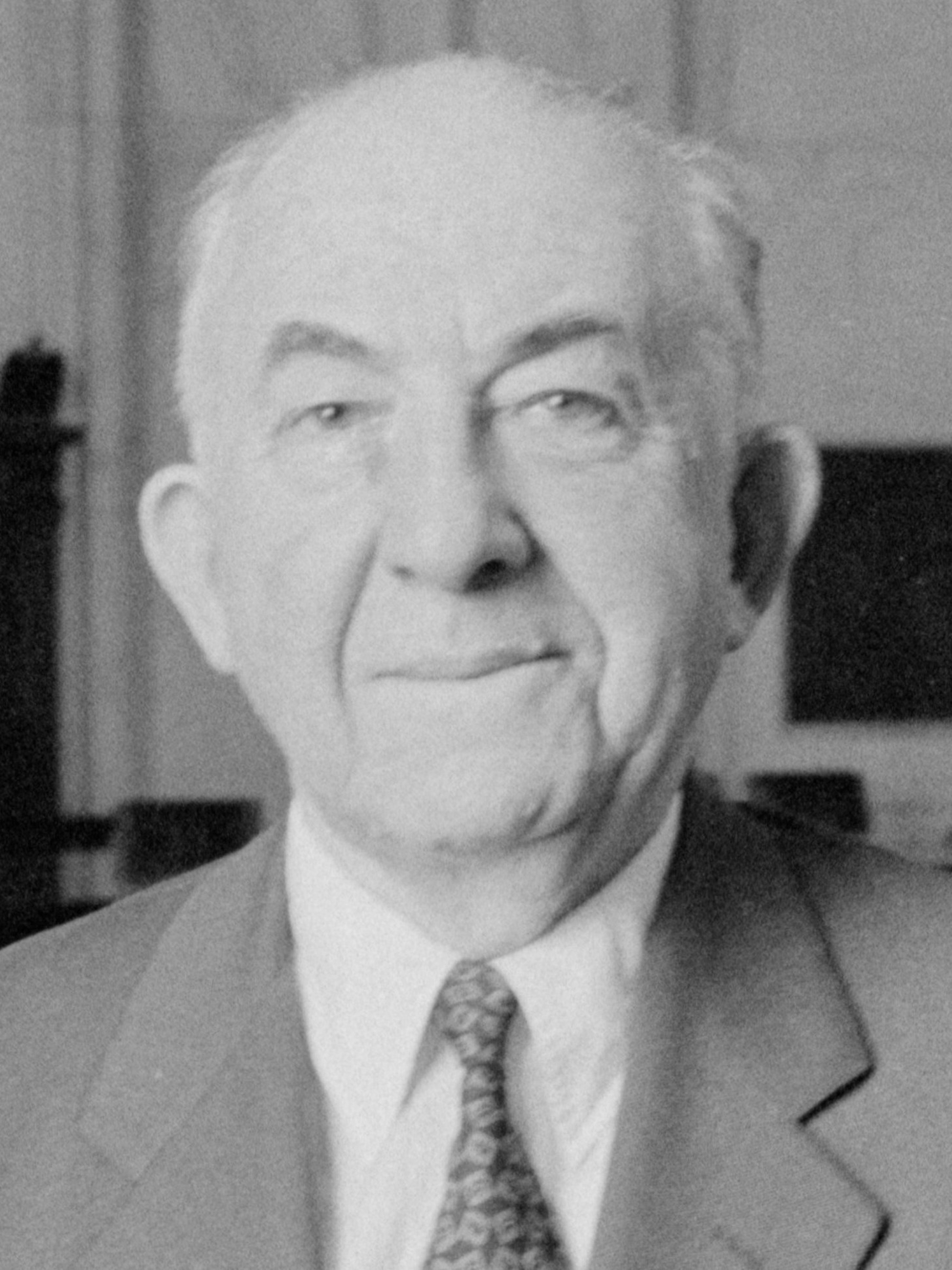

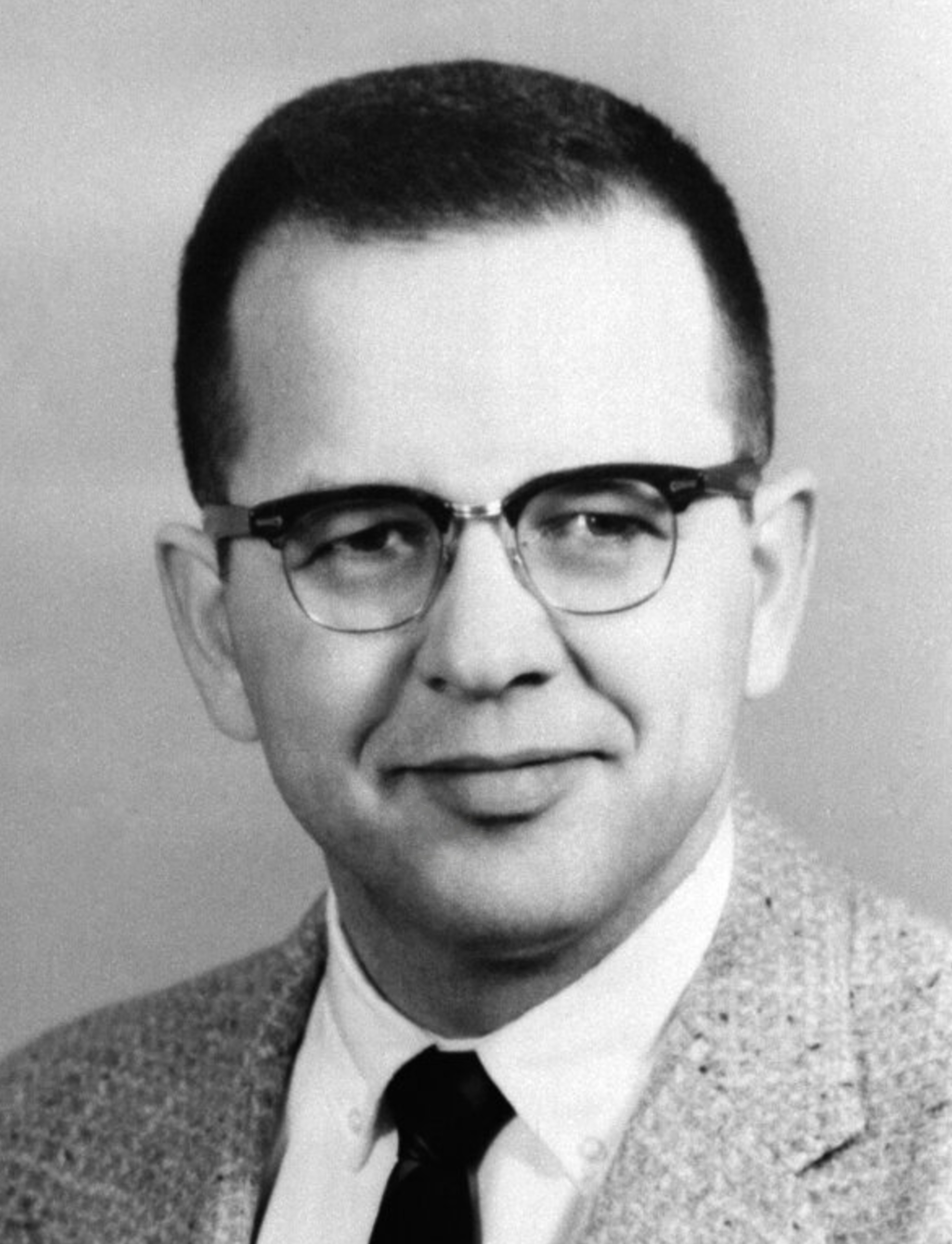
Nominee	Ernest Gruening	Ted Stevens
Party	Democratic	Republican
Popular vote	33,827	24,354
Percentage	58.14%	41.86%
- Gruening: 50–60% 60–70% 70–80% 80–90%
U.S. senator before election
Ernest Gruening
Democratic
Elected U.S. Senator
Ernest Gruening
Democratic

The 1962 United States Senate election in Alaska took place on November 6, 1962. Incumbent Democratic U.S. Senator Ernest Gruening ran for a second (his first full) term in office and defeated Republican nominee, Anchorage lawyer, former Interior Solicitor & former U.S. Attorney Ted Stevens.

Stevens was appointed to Alaska's other (Class II) U.S. Senate seat in 1968, following the death of Bob Bartlett and served for over forty years, he briefly served with Gruening until the latter's departure in 1969, serving as President pro tempore, and winning seven elections until his defeat in 2008.

== Democratic primary ==
=== Candidates ===
- Ernest Gruening, incumbent U.S. Senator since 1959
- Robert L. Veach

=== Results ===
1962 Democratic U.S. Senate primary
Party	Candidate	Votes	%
Democratic	Ernest Gruening (incumbent)	18,525	86.28%
Democratic	Robert L. Veach	2,946	13.72%
Total votes		21,471	100.00

== Republican primary ==
=== Candidates ===
- Frank Cook, insurance agent, Boone and Crockett record-holding sport hunter
- Ted Stevens, former U.S. Attorney for the Fourth Division of Alaska Territory, Solicitor of the Department of the Interior, and co-author of the Alaska Statehood Act

=== Results ===
1962 Republican U.S. Senate primary
Party	Candidate	Votes	%
Republican	Ted Stevens	11,000	72.49%
Republican	Frank Cook	4,175	27.51%
Total votes		15,175	100.00

== General election ==
1962 United States Senate election in Alaska
Party	Candidate	Votes	%	±%
Democratic	Ernest Gruening (inc.)	33,827	58.14%	
Republican	Ted Stevens	24,354	41.86%	
Total votes		58,181	100.00%	
Democratic hold		Swing		

== See also ==
- 1962 United States Senate elections
