= Alaska Statehood Act =

1958 United States law

- Long title: An Act to provide for the admission of the State of Alaska into the Union.
- Enacted by: the 85th United States Congress

Citations
- Public law: Pub. L. 85–508
- Statutes at Large: 72 Stat. 339

Codification
- Titles amended: Title 28—Judiciary and Judicial Procedure

Legislative history
- Introduced in the House as H.R. 7999 by Leo W. O'Brien (D–NY) on June 7, 1957; Committee consideration by House Interior and Insular Affairs; Passed the House on May 28, 1958 (210–166); Passed the Senate on June 30, 1958 (64–20); Signed into law by President Dwight D. Eisenhower on July 7, 1958

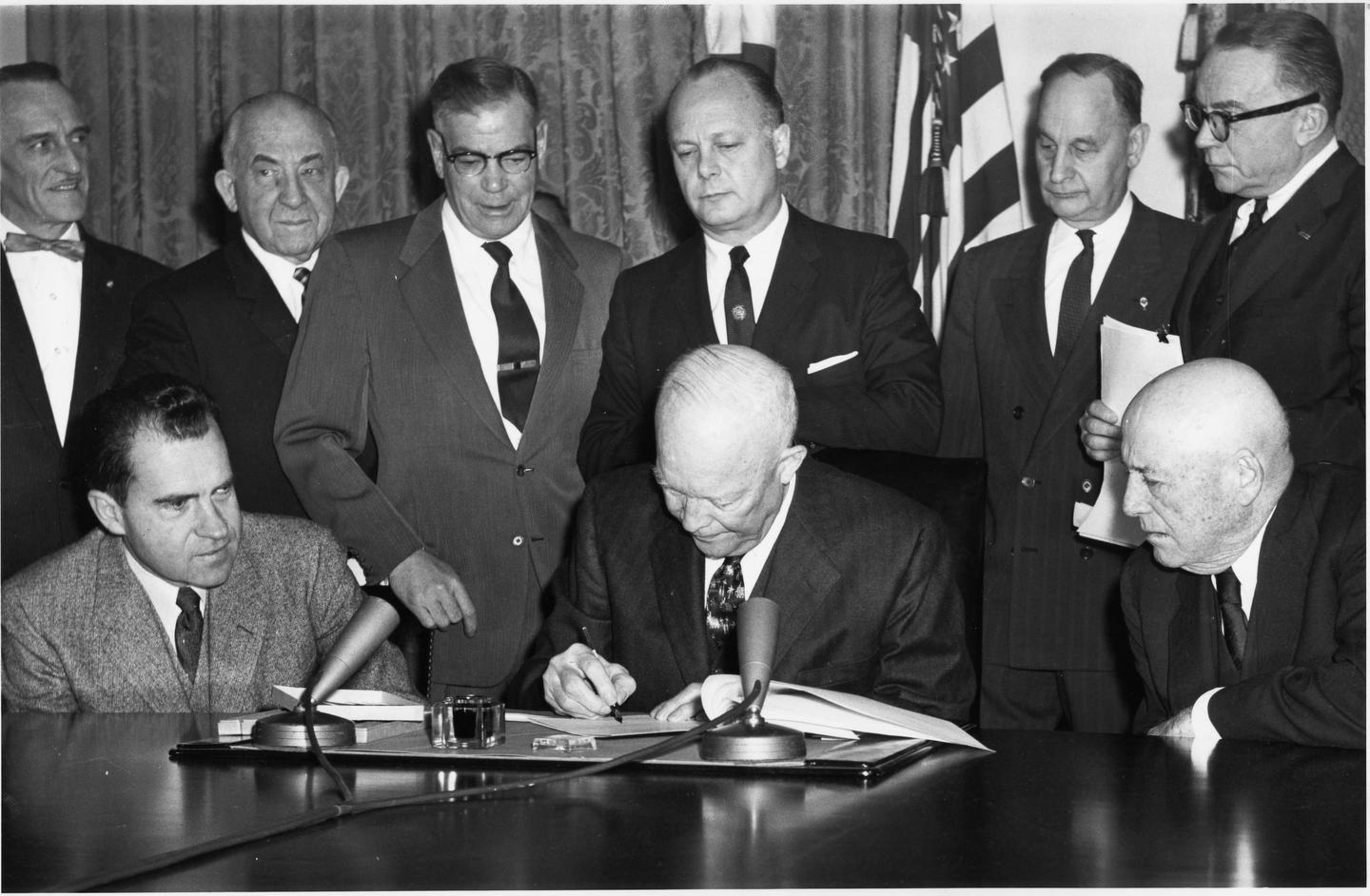
Signing of the Alaska Statehood Act

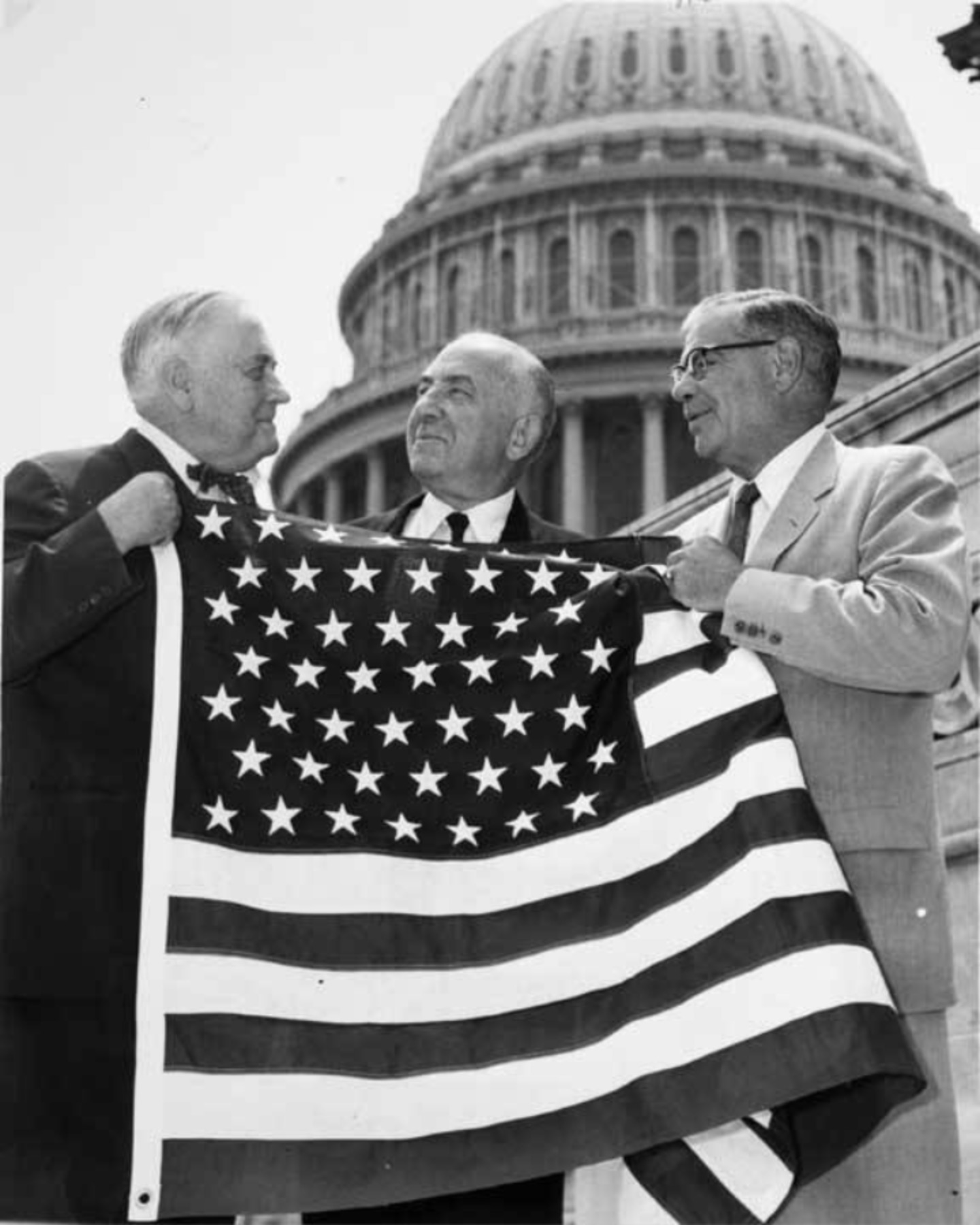
Bob Bartlett and Ernest Gruening hold the 49 star U.S. Flag after the admission of Alaska as the 49th state.

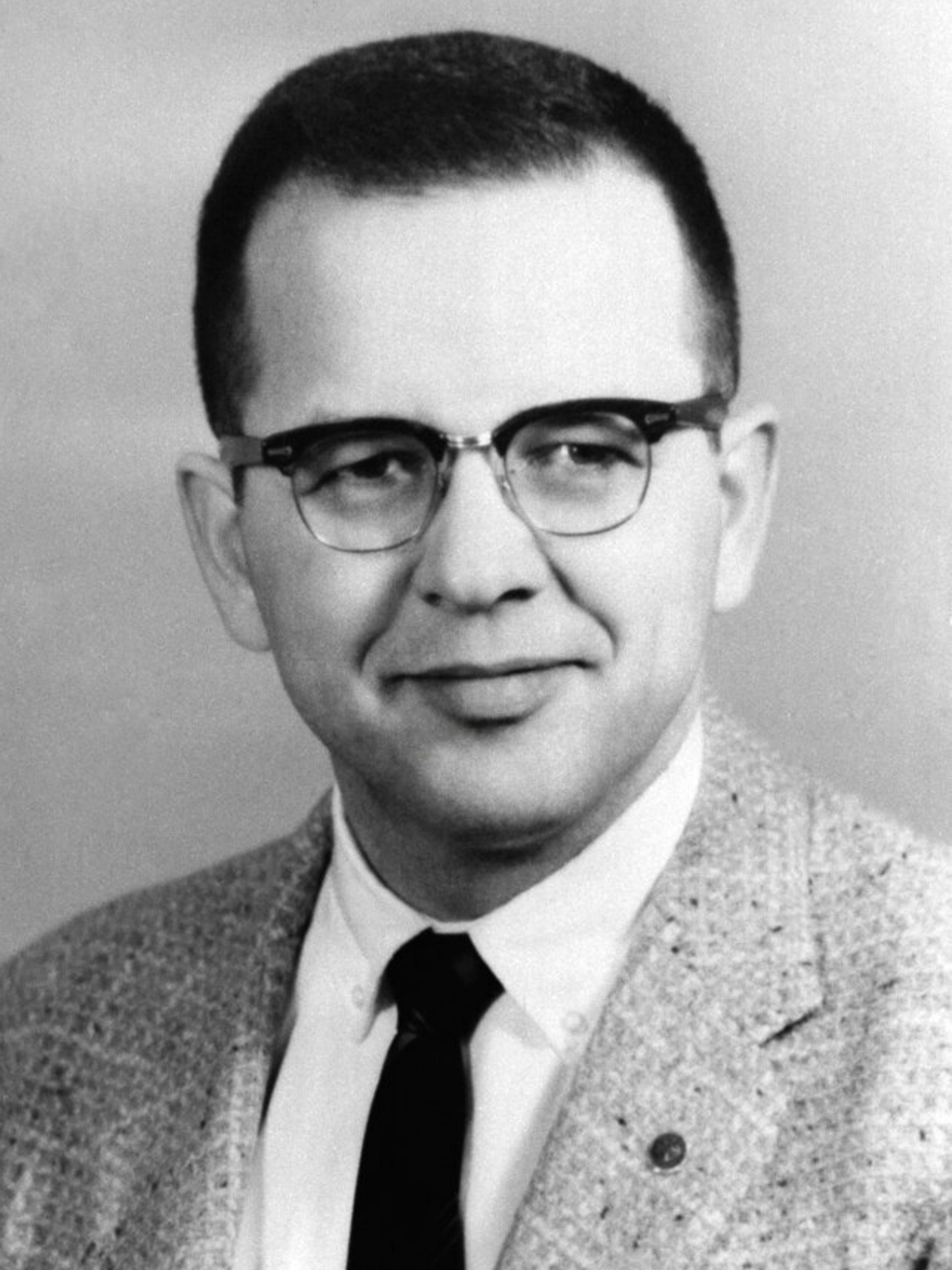
Ted Stevens was instrumental in passing the law through the executive branch.

The Alaska Statehood Act (Pub. L. 85–508, 72 Stat. 339, enacted July 7, 1958) was a legislative act introduced by Delegate E. L. "Bob" Bartlett and signed by President Dwight D. Eisenhower on July 7, 1958. Through it, Alaska became the 49th U.S. state on January 3, 1959. The law was the culmination of a multi-decade effort by many prominent Alaskans, including Bartlett, Ernest Gruening, Bill Egan, Bob Atwood, and Ted Stevens.

The law was first introduced by James Wickersham in 1916, shortly after the First Organic Act. However, due to a lack of interest from Alaskans, the bill was never introduced. Efforts increased in 1943, with Bartlett's rendition of the act being introduced first in 1947 and 1950, with the backing of President Harry Truman. However, due to opposition from powerful southern U.S. Congressmen, it took until 1958 to pass the law, with the convincing of Bob Bartlett. Gruening worked on rallying support from Alaskans, launching the Alaska Constitutional Convention in 1956, which elected Bill Egan and Gruening as Shadow U.S. Senators, and Ralph Rivers as the Shadow U.S. Representative, working towards pressuring the U.S. Congress for Alaska's statehood. Atwood similarly rallied support by using his job as a trusted news source to rally Alaskans for statehood. Stevens worked on masterminding the executive branch's attack, using his powerful executive office as Solicitor of the Department of the Interior, along with Interior Secretary Fred Seaton, to lobby for Alaska's statehood, placing reporters in any and all news hearings to pressure President Eisenhower & Congressmen to switch in favor of the law. Stevens also authored parts of the Act (namely Section 10).

Roger Ernst, Seaton's former Assistant Secretary for Public Land Management, said of Stevens: "He did all the work on statehood; he wrote 90 percent of all the speeches. Statehood was his main project."

== History ==
From 1867 to 1884, Alaska was considered to be a military district of the United States under the control of the federal government, known as the Department of Alaska. From 1884 to 1912, it was organized as the District of Alaska, and from 1912 to 1959, it was organized into the incorporated Territory of Alaska. Alaskans had sought statehood since as early as the 1920s, though this vision was not realized until the decade after World War II.

=== The First Organic Act ===
In 1884, the Department of Alaska was organized into the District of Alaska, when Congress passed the Organic Act allowing Alaska to become a judicial district as well as a civil one, with judges, clerks, marshalls, and limited government officials appointed by the federal government to run the territory. Furthermore, during the 1896–1910 gold rush eras (mainly in the Klondike, Nome, and Fairbanks regions), hundreds of thousands of people traveled to Alaska in search of gold. Several industries flourished as a result, such as fishing, trapping, mining, and mineral production. Alaska's resources were depleted to the extent that it came to be considered a "colonial economy". However, Alaska was still considered a district, and local governments often had little control over local affairs.

=== The Second Organic Act ===
Several issues arose that made it more difficult for Alaska to push toward self-government. One of these was the formation of the "Alaska Syndicate" in 1906 by the two industry barons J. P. Morgan and Simon Guggenheim. Their influence spread, and they came to control the Kennecott copper mine, steamship and railroad companies, and salmon packing. The influence of the Syndicate in Washington D.C. opposed any further movement towards Alaskan home rule. James Wickersham, however, grew increasingly concerned over the exploitation of Alaska for personal and corporate interests and took it upon himself to fight for Alaskan self-rule. He used the Ballinger–Pinchot affair in order to help achieve this. As a result of the affair, Alaska was in the national headlines, and President William Howard Taft was forced to send a message to Congress on February 2, 1912, insisting that they listen to Wickersham. In August 1912 Congress passed the Second Organic Act, which established the Territory of Alaska with a capital at Juneau and an elected legislature. The federal government still retained much of the control over laws regarding fishing, gaming, and natural resources and the governor was also still appointed by the President. In 1916, Wickersham, who was now a delegate to Congress, proposed the first bill for Alaska's statehood. The bill, however, failed, partly due to lack of interest among Alaskans in gaining statehood.

=== National and Congressional discrimination ===
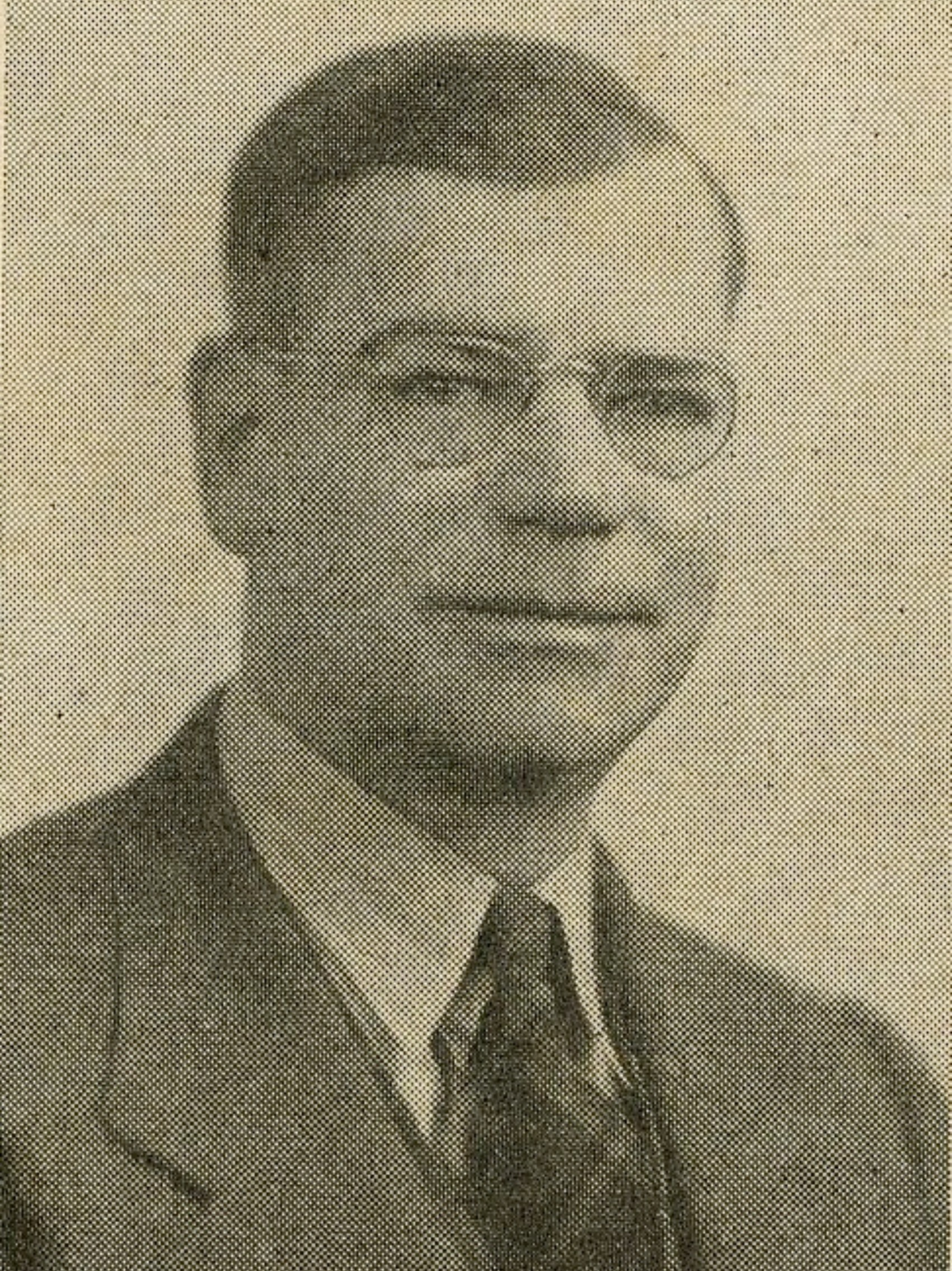
Delegate Bartlett was key in gathering support in the legislative branch.

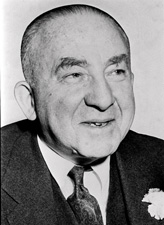
Governor Gruening was key in gathering support amongst Alaskans.

Discrimination against the Alaskan Territory made it difficult for Congress to get much done. Discussion of revising the Second Organic Act took up much time but came to no avail. Instead, Congress passed the Jones Act (also known as the Merchant Marine Act of 1920) and the White Act of 1924 both of which made the fishing problem worse for Alaskans rather than better. Alaskans were angered by these two acts and felt they were discriminatory. Matters were made worse by regional conflicts which drew attention away from the issue of statehood. In the 1930s, Alaska was plagued by the Great Depression. During this time, President Franklin D. Roosevelt did two significant things for Alaska. First, he allowed for 1,000 selected farmers hurt by the depression to move to Alaska and colonize the Matanuska-Susitna Valley, being given a second chance at agricultural success. Second (and sometimes considered to be more importantly), Roosevelt appointed Ernest Gruening as governor of Alaska in 1939. Edward Lewis "Bob" Bartlett, who was one of Alaska's territorial delegates to Congress from 1944 to 1958 when he became a U.S. senator representing Alaska, would become one of Gruening's most important allies in supporting the cause for Alaskan statehood.

=== Breaking down the barriers toward statehood ===
Alaska's desire for statehood was much aided by the amount of attention it received during World War II. After Japan initiated the Aleutian Islands Campaign in June 1942, the territory became an important strategic military base and a key to the Pacific during the war, with a resulting population increase due to the number of American servicemen sent there. It remained critically important in deterring Soviet aggression through the Bering Strait during the Cold War. However, many barriers still stood between Alaska and statehood. Many Alaskans, like the Lomen brothers of Nome and Austin E. "Cap" Lathrop, who benefited largely from Alaska's small tax base, did not want themselves or their businesses to be hurt financially by the increase in taxes that would result from statehood. Other Alaskans feared that statehood would result in a flood of more people coming to Alaska, which they didn't want. There was enough of a majority, though, that did want statehood so as to be able to pass a referendum for statehood in Alaska in 1946 by a 3:2 vote.

=== Opposition ===
With the help of the referendum, Bartlett was able to introduce a bill to Congress. The bill, however, was immediately shot down by a coalition of Democrats and Republicans. Republicans feared that Alaska would be unable to raise enough taxes due to its small population and end up as a welfare state while Southern Democrats feared more pro-civil rights congressmen. In retaliation, Gruening established the "Alaska Statehood Committee" in 1949. He encouraged journalists, newspaper editors, politicians, and members of national and labor organizations to help use their positions and power to make the issue of Alaskan statehood more known. He gathered a group of 100 prominent figures, including Eleanor Roosevelt, actor James Cagney, writers Pearl S. Buck and John Gunther, historian Arthur M. Schlesinger Jr., and theologian Reinhold Niebuhr, who all stood for the Alaskan cause. Another bill was introduced to Congress in 1949 and passed in the House by a 186 to 146 vote in 1950. However, the bill was then shot down in the Senate, again for fear of adding more Democrats to the 81st Congress (1949–1951), as the Democrats already had 54 seats to 42 Republican seats. On February 27, 1952, the Senate by a one-vote margin (45–44) killed the statehood bill for another year, with Southern Democrats having threatened a filibuster to delay consideration. In the 1954 State of the Union address, Eisenhower referred to statehood for Hawaii (then a Republican-leaning territory) but not Alaska (then a Democratic-leaning territory). By March, frustrated by Eisenhower's refusal to support statehood for Alaska, a Senate coalition led by Democrats tied the fates of Alaska and Hawaii statehood together as one package. The procedural move was backed by some Southern Democrats, concerned about the addition of new votes in the civil rights for blacks movement, in the hope of defeating both measures.

=== Increasing public interest ===
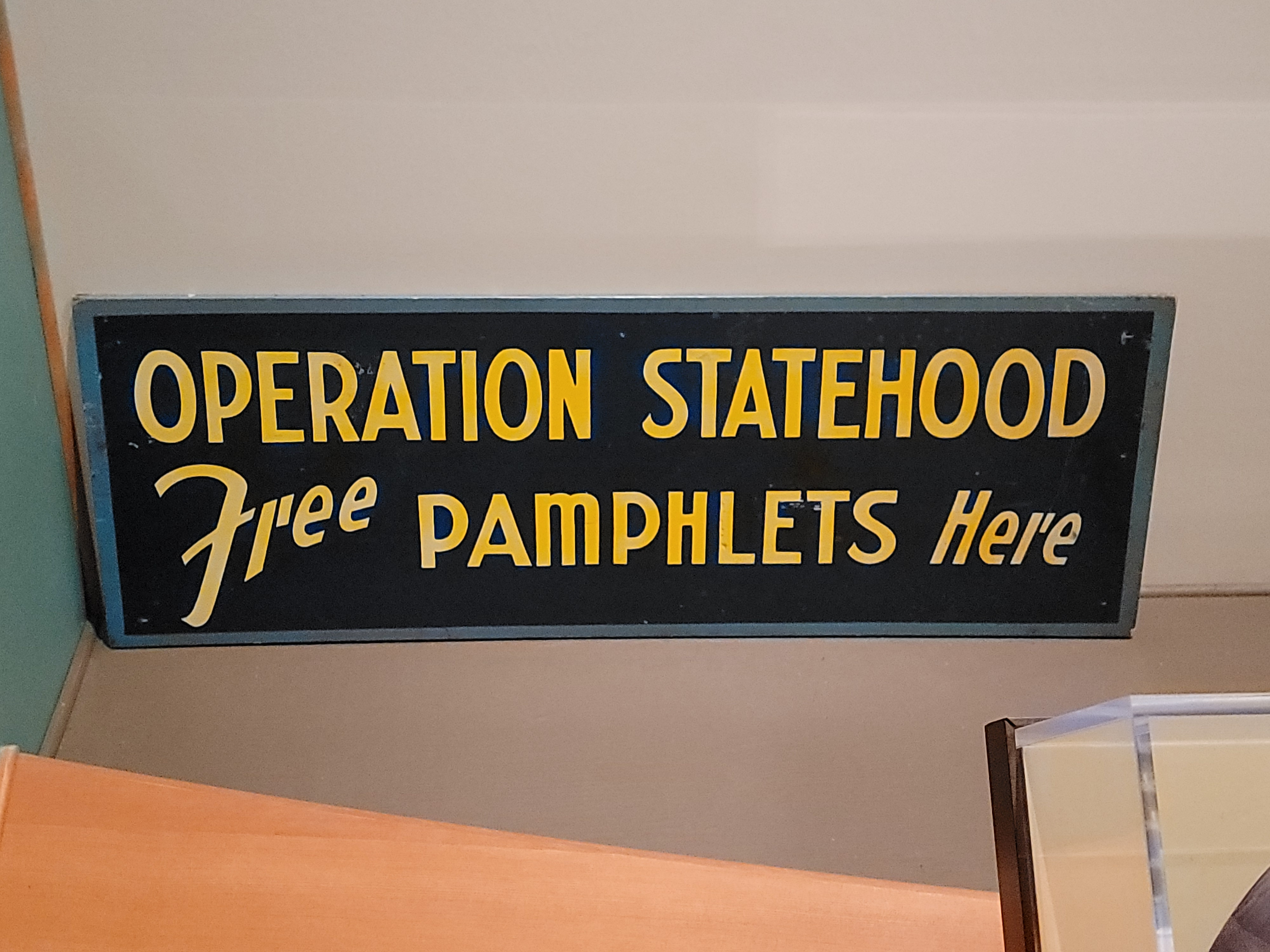
Sign for the Alaska statehood campaign in the Sitka Historical Museum

Six members of the Senate Interior and Insular Affairs Committee, including Senator Butler, went to Alaska in order to hold public hearings and see for themselves what the public sentiment was in Alaska. In response to the visit, Alaskans would not let Americans forget the cause. Citizens sent Christmas cards reading "Make [Alaskans'] future bright/Ask your Senator for statehood/And start the New Year right." Women made bouquets of Alaska's flower, the Forget-Me-Not and sent them to members of Congress. Movements such as "Operation Statehood" also put increasing pressure on Congress. "Lack of public interest" could no longer be used as a feasible excuse to prevent statehood.

In 1954, territorial governor B. Frank Heintzleman proposed that Alaska be divided at the 156th meridian west. Most Alaskans opposed his proposal.

==== Gruening and the Constitutional Convention ====
In interest of the growing fervor and enthusiasm toward the cause, a Constitutional Convention was held at the University of Alaska, Fairbanks, in 1955. During this convention, Gruening gave a very powerful speech which compared Alaska's situation to the American struggle for independence. The famous speech was entitled "Let Us End American Colonialism" and had a very influential impact. The convention was highly praised and very emotional. The Constitution for Alaska was written up and Alaskans voted and passed the Alaska Constitution in 1956 with overwhelming approval. The Constitution was named "one of the best, if not the best, state constitutions ever written" by the National Municipal League.

==== The Tennessee Plan ====
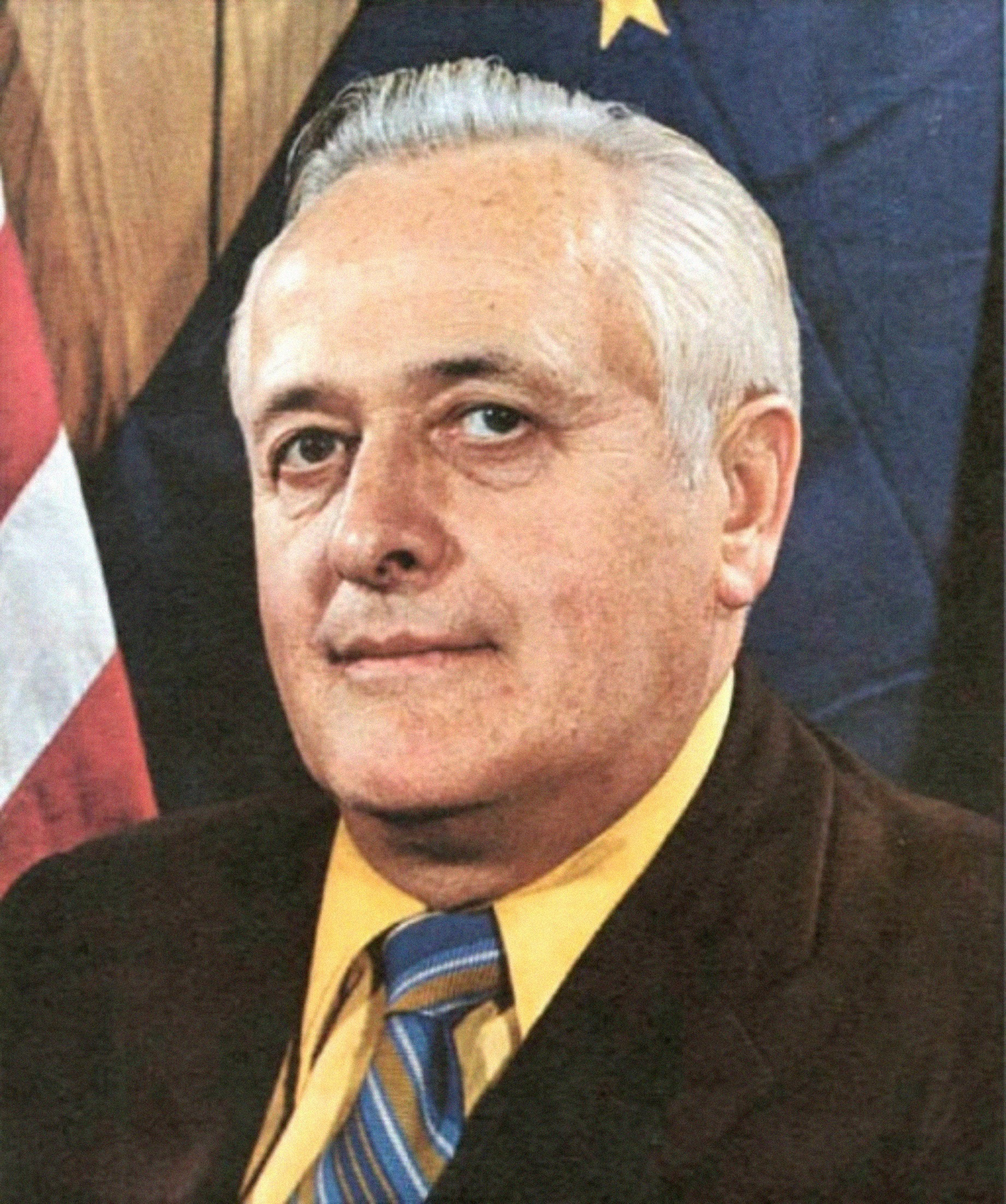
Bill Egan was elected as the junior shadow U.S. Senator. He would be elected Governor upon statehood.

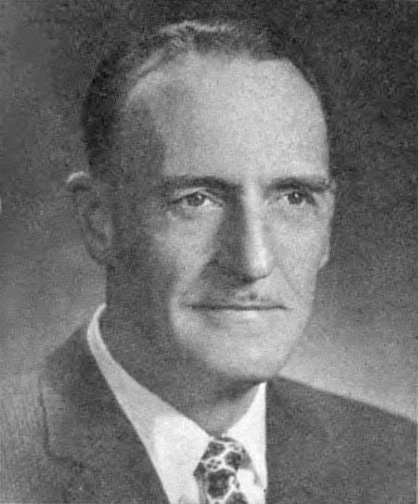
Ralph Rivers was elected as the at-large shadow U.S. Representative. He would be elected as a proper representative upon statehood.

Another step forward for the cause was taken by the Alaskan adoption of the "Tennessee Plan" which allowed them to elect their delegates to Congress without having to wait for an official act from Congress. Alaskans therefore elected to Congress Senators Ernest Gruening and William A. Egan and Representative to the House Ralph J. Rivers. Gruening, Egan, and Rivers attended Congress and were politely received, though they were not officially seated or recognized in any way. The Alaskan delegation did not give up, however, and worked hard with Bartlett to pressure the Congress into action.

==== Members of Congress change their minds, debate, and hold the final vote ====
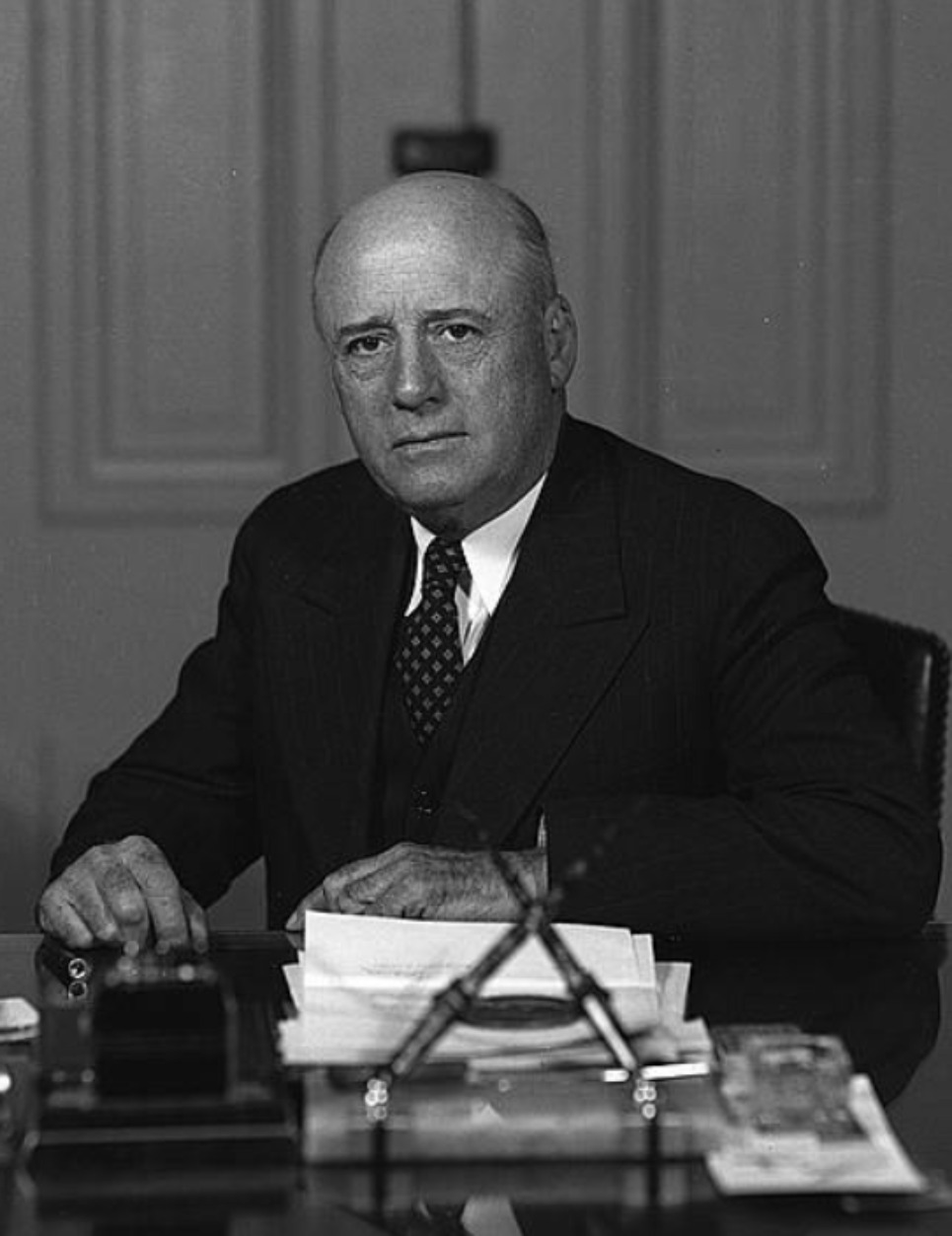
Powerful Speaker of the House Sam Rayburn changed his mind in 1957, by the urging of Senator Bartlett.

Eventually, with the help of Bartlett's influence, the Speaker of the House, Sam Rayburn, who until 1957 had been an ardent opponent of the Alaskan statehood cause, changed his mind and when Congress reconvened in January 1958, President Eisenhower fully endorsed the bill for the first time. Senator Lyndon B. Johnson promised his commitment to the bill but others still stood in the way, such as Representative Howard W. Smith of Virginia, Chairman of the powerful Rules Committee, and Thomas Pelly of Washington State who wanted the Alaskan waters to be open to use by Washingtonians. Senator Prescott Bush of Connecticut stated that Alaska's population was too small, the territory was non-contiguous, economic conditions were unstable and statehood would increase taxes sharply, which would thus disrupt economic development within the state. Senator Stuart Symington of Missouri spoke that making Alaska a state "would strengthen our national defense", and Senator Wayne Morse stated that "the bill's effect on foreign relations 'would be tremendous', for it would show the world that we 'support self-government and actually believe in freedom put into practice.'". Representative Barratt O'Hara attacked the opposition's fear of the act, stating "During my life-time, 10 states have been admitted to the Union and each time opponents raised the arguments of fear and distrust that we have heard in this debate." Representative W. Smith would rebut "All of those 10 states together were granted less than one-third the land that Alaska is granted and none got mineral rights or the option to choose which land to claim."

Debate lasted for hours within both chambers. Eventually, though, the resistance was able to be bypassed, and the House passed the statehood bill by a 210–166 vote. The Senate, which had had its own version of the bill as well as the House's version, finally managed to pass the House's bill through the fervent urging of Bartlett by a 64–20 vote. On January 3, 1959, after much struggle and through the efforts of many, Alaska finally became the 49th state of the United States of America after President Eisenhower signed the official declaration.

==== August 26, 1958, ballots ====
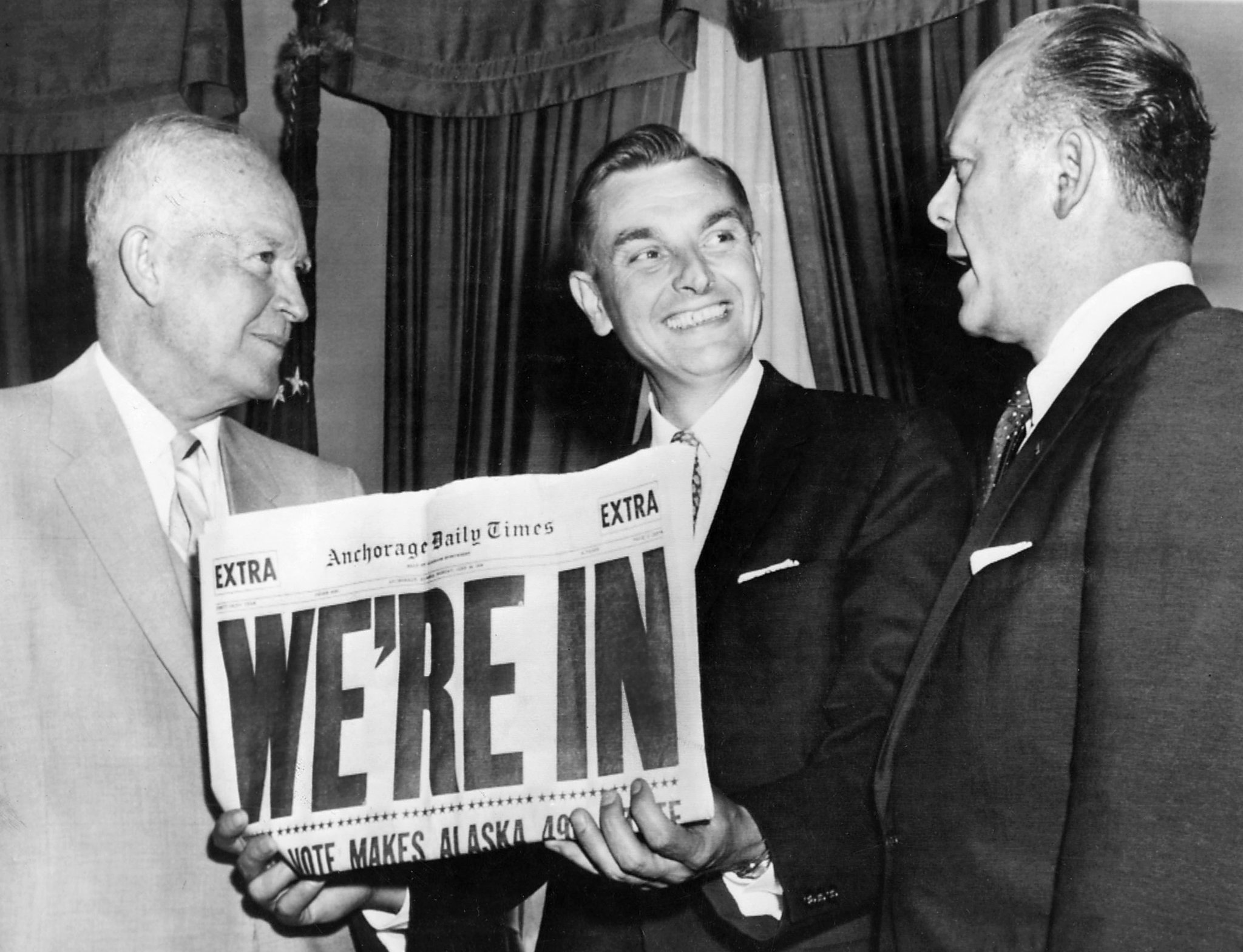
Dwight D. Eisenhower, Mike Stepovich & Fred A. Seaton celebrate Alaska statehood.

Three propositions had to be passed by Alaskans in order for statehood to happen:

1. "Shall Alaska immediately be admitted into the Union as a State?"
2. "The boundaries of the State of Alaska shall be as prescribed in the Act of Congress approved July 7, 1958 and all claims of this State to any areas of land or sea outside the boundaries so prescribed are hereby irrevocably relinquished to the United States."
3. "All provisions of the Act of Congress approved July 7, 1958 reserving rights or powers to the United States, as well as those prescribing the terms or conditions of the grants of lands or other property therein made to the State of Alaska, are consented to fully by said State and its people."

All three propositions were approved by Alaskans in a special election held on August 26, 1958. Voter turnout was high.

On the first question, "Shall Alaska immediately be admitted into the Union as a state?", the result was 40,452 in favor, and 8,010 against.

== Civil rights, Alaska, and Hawaii ==
In the late 1950s civil rights bills were being introduced in Congress. To overcome the Southern Democrats' suppression of the pro-Republican African-American vote, then-Republican Hawaii's prospects for statehood were tied to Alaska's, which many thought would be more Democratic. Hawaii statehood was expected to result in the addition of two pro-civil-rights senators from a state which would be the first to have a majority non-white population. This would endanger the Southern minority segregationist Democratic Senate by providing two more pro-civil rights votes to invoke cloture and halt a Senate filibuster.

== See also ==
- Enabling Act (United States)
- Hawaii Admission Act
