= Elmer E. Rasmuson =

American politician

Elmer Rasmuson
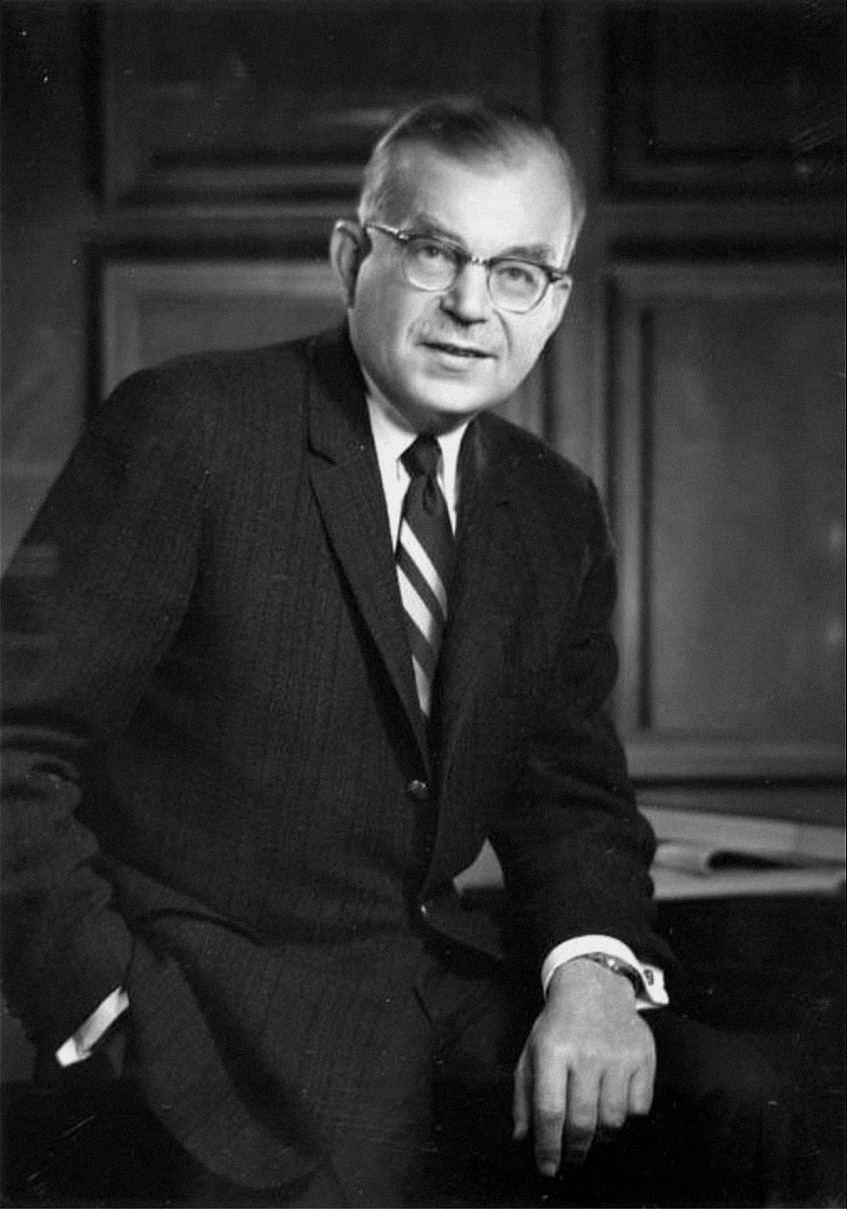
- Official portrait of Rasmuson in 1968

Mayor of Anchorage
- In office April 8, 1964 – April 8, 1967
- Preceded by: George Sharrock
- Succeeded by: George M. Sullivan

Personal details
- Born: Elmer Edwin Rasmuson; February 15, 1909 Yakutat, Alaska, U.S.
- Died: December 1, 2000 (aged 91) Seattle, Washington, U.S.
- Party: Republican
- Education: Harvard University (BS, MA)

Elmer Edwin Rasmuson (February 15, 1909 – December 1, 2000) was an American banker, philanthropist and politician in the territory and state of Alaska. He led the family business, National Bank of Alaska, for many decades as president and later chairman. He also served as Mayor of Anchorage from 1964 to 1967 and was the Republican nominee for United States Senator from Alaska in the 1968 election, losing the general election to Mike Gravel.

== Early life ==
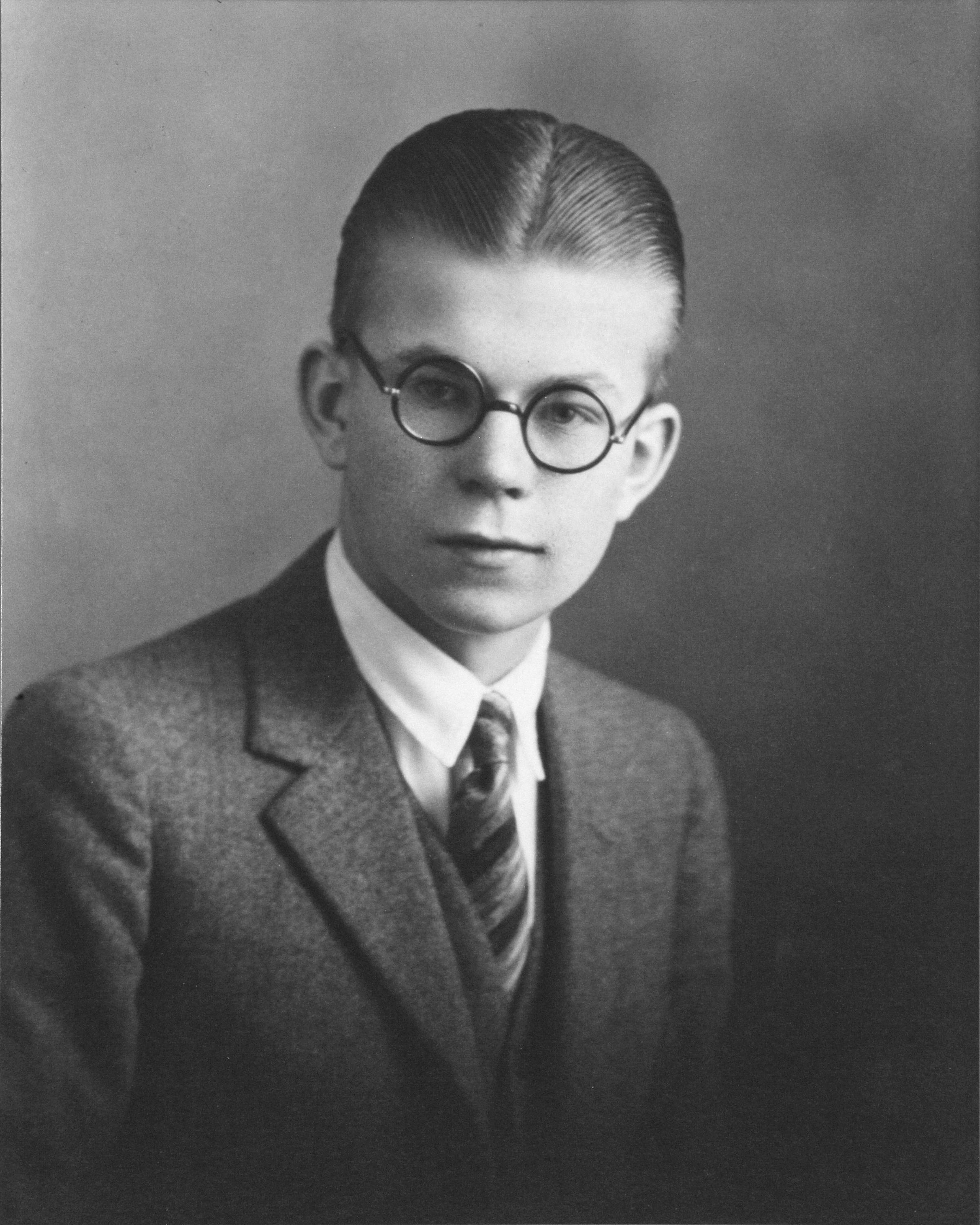
Rasmuson as a young adult, c. 1930

Elmer Edwin Rasmuson was born in Yakutat, Alaska to Edward Anton Rasmuson (1882–1949) and Jenny Olson Rasmuson, Swedish immigrants and missionaries of the Evangelical Covenant Church who had met in Yakutat. Elmer had an older sister, Evangeline, who was born in 1906.

Elmer's father took correspondence courses in law, and in 1915, moved the family to Minneapolis, Minnesota, where he passed the bar examination. The family moved back to Alaska within the year, stopping first in Juneau before settling in Skagway, where Edward found work as a magistrate.

Elmer attended Skagway School. In his memoirs, he called Skagway a "good town in which to grow up." While he was still in school, he worked for the Bank of Alaska, which his father had taken over in 1918. He graduated from Queen Anne High School in Seattle, Washington in 1925, and after a couple of years at the University of Washington, transferred to Harvard University in 1928, earning a Bachelor of Science in 1930 and a Master of Arts in 1935.

== Family and work ==
He went to work for Arthur Andersen, and in 1939, married Lile Bernard of New Jersey. They had three children: Edward Bernard (born 1940), Lile Gibbons, and Judy.

In 1940, Andersen sent Elmer to work in Houston, Texas, mostly for Texaco. Elmer returned to Skagway in 1943, recalled by his father, who began to suffer from heart disease. Elmer was installed as president of the National Bank of Alaska. In 1945, the bank's headquarters were moved to Anchorage. Edward Anton Rasmuson died in 1949, leaving the bank to his son.

In 1954, together with brother-in-law Robert Atwood (who had married Evangeline in 1932), Elmer invested in Richfield Oil's exploration of the Kenai Peninsula. The investment yielded great profits after oil was discovered in 1957 near the Swanson River.

In 1955, Elmer created, with his mother, the charitable Rasmuson Foundation. It was to become "the most generous private donor in Alaska history."

Elmer's wife, Lile, died of cancer in 1960. The same year, a merger made National Bank of Alaska the largest bank in the state.

In 1961, Elmer married Mary Louise Milligan, national director of the Women's Army Corps.

In 1972, Elmer received the Golden Plate Award of the American Academy of Achievement.

== Political career and legacy ==
Critical of government response to the Good Friday earthquake of 1964, Rasmuson ran for Mayor of Anchorage, and was elected. He served a three-year term, overseeing reconstruction of the city. In 1967, he organized the foundation of the Anchorage Historical and Fine Arts Museum, intended to celebrate the 100th anniversary of the Purchase of Alaska.

In 1968, he ran for the U.S. Senate in the Republican primary, beating out Ted Stevens for the party's nomination. But he lost the general election, coming second to Democrat Mike Gravel. Incumbent Senator Ernest Gruening, who had lost his party's nomination to Gravel, placed third.

In 1969, Rasmuson stepped down as Regent of the University of Alaska Fairbanks, a position he had held since 1950. In 1970, the Elmer E. Rasmuson Library was dedicated to his service.

In 1974, Elmer Rasmuson retired from work at the National Bank of Alaska, transferring the business to his son, Edward B. Rasmuson.

In 1980, Elmer Rasmuson was elected as the first chairman of the Board of Trustees of the newly formed Alaska Permanent Fund. He would hold this position until 1982.

Elmer E. Rasmuson died December 1, 2000, in Seattle, as a result of congestive heart failure. He concluded decades of philanthropic work by leaving his fortune to charity, including $19 million for the University of Alaska Fairbanks and $400 million for Rasmuson Foundation.

== Bibliography ==
- Rasmuson, Elmer E. and Cole, Terrence. Banking On Alaska: The Story of the National Bank of Alaska (2 volumes). University of Alaska Press: Fairbanks.

Political offices
Preceded by George Sharrock	Mayor of Anchorage; 1964–1967	Succeeded by George M. Sullivan
Party political offices
Preceded by Ted Stevens	Republican nominee for U.S. Senator from Alaska (Class 3); 1968	Succeeded by C. R. Lewis
