= Ernest Gruening =

Governor of the Alaska Territory and U.S. Senator

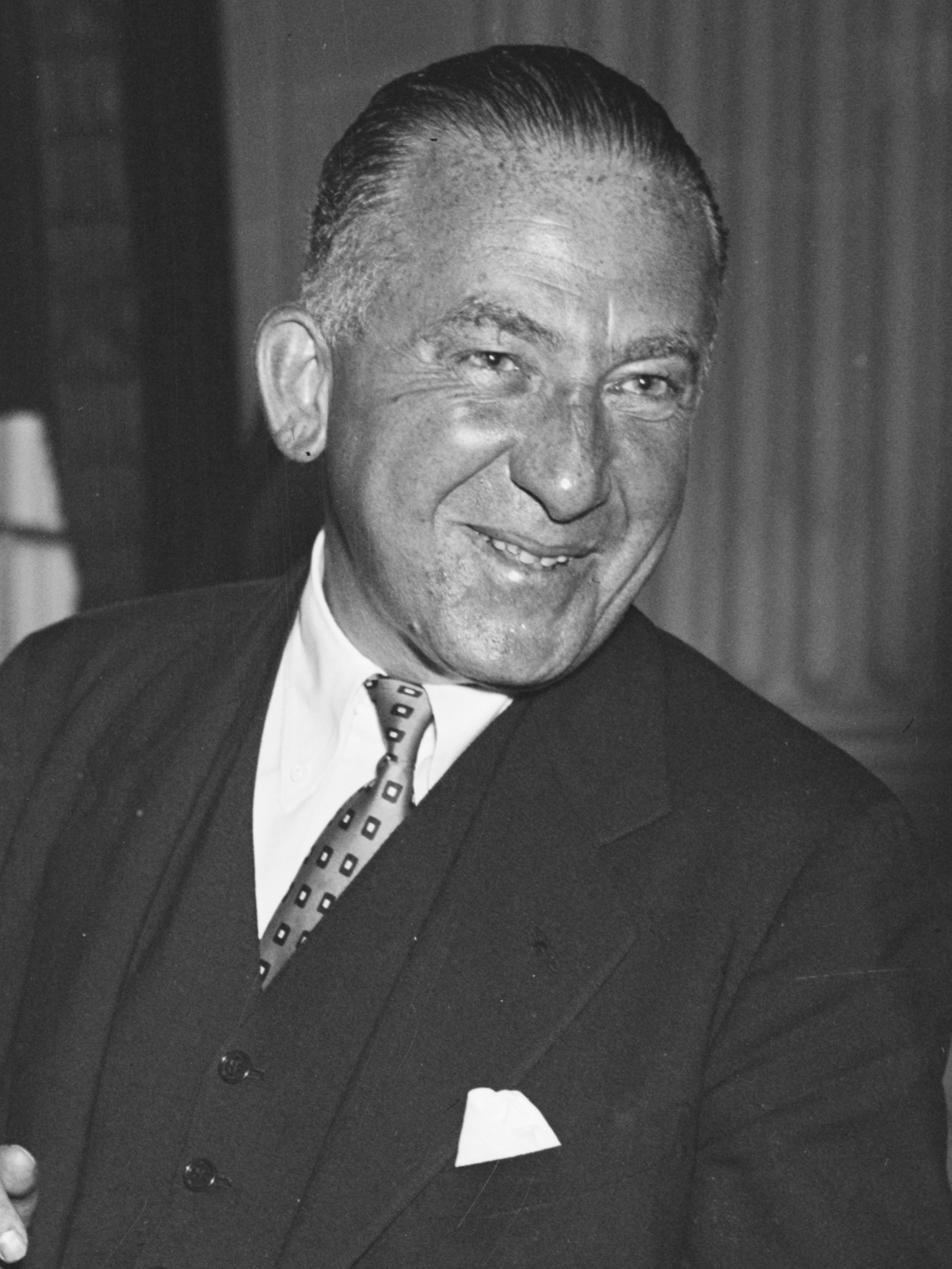
- Gruening in 1935

United States Senator from Alaska
- In office January 3, 1959 – January 3, 1969
- Preceded by: Himself (Shadow Senator)
- Succeeded by: Mike Gravel

United States Shadow Senator from the Alaska Territory
- In office October 6, 1956 – January 3, 1959
- Preceded by: Seat established
- Succeeded by: Himself (U.S. Senator)

7th Governor of Alaska Territory
- In office December 6, 1939 – April 10, 1953
- Lieutenant: Bob Bartlett
- Preceded by: John Troy
- Succeeded by: Frank Heintzleman

Personal details
- Born: Ernest Henry Gruening; February 6, 1887 New York City, New York, U.S.
- Died: June 26, 1974 (aged 87) Washington, D.C., U.S.
- Party: Democratic
- Spouse: Dorothy Smith
- Relations: Clark Gruening (grandson)
- Children: 3
- Education: Harvard University (BS, MD)

Military service
- Branch/service: United States Army
- Years of service: 1917–1918
- Unit: Field Artillery Corps
- Battles/wars: World War I

Ernest Henry Gruening (/ˈɡriːnɪŋ/ GREEN-ing; February 6, 1887 – June 26, 1974) was an American journalist and politician. A member of the Democratic Party, Gruening was the governor of the Alaska Territory from 1939 until 1953, and a United States senator from Alaska from 1959 until 1969.

Born in New York City, Gruening pursued a career in journalism after graduating from Harvard Medical School. After working for various newspapers in New York and Boston, he served in various roles during the administration of President Franklin D. Roosevelt. He was appointed as Governor of Alaska in 1939 and became a prominent advocate of Alaska statehood; known as "the Father of Alaska statehood".

Gruening became one of Alaska's inaugural pair of senators, along with Bob Bartlett, after Alaska gained statehood in 1959. Gruening was a prominent opponent of the Vietnam War, and with Oregon's Wayne Morse, was one of just two senators to vote against the Gulf of Tonkin Resolution which allowed the bombing of North Vietnam. In 1968, Mike Gravel defeated Gruening in the Democratic Senate primary, and Gruening's attempt to win re-election as an independent was unsuccessful.

== Early life ==
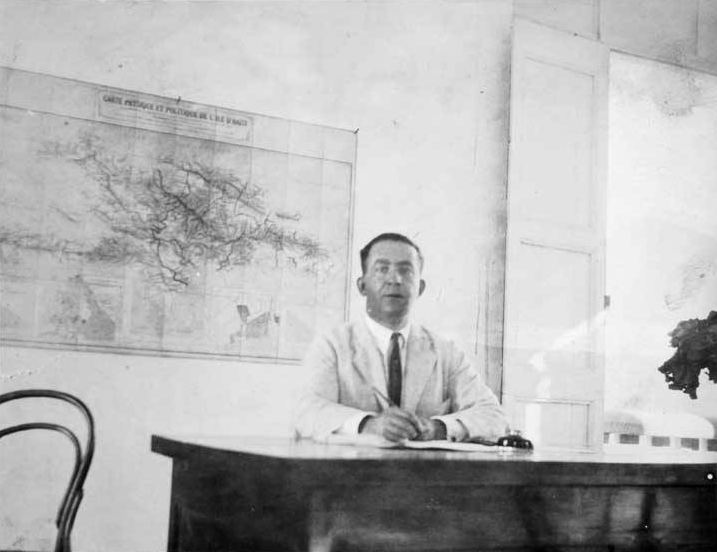
Ernest Gruening in Haiti, c. 1910s or 1920s

Gruening was born in New York City to a Jewish family, the son of Phebe (Fridenberg) and Emil Gruening, a German-born eye and ear surgeon, who had fought in the American Civil War, and was present when Confederate General Robert E. Lee signed the surrender which ended the war. Gruening attended The Hotchkiss School, and he graduated from Harvard University in 1907 and from Harvard Medical School in 1912 at the age of 25. He then forsook medicine to pursue journalism, finding it more exciting. Initially a reporter for the Boston American in 1912, he went on to become copy desk editor and rewrite man for the Boston Evening Herald and, from 1912 to 1913, an editorial writer. He also worked for the Boston Herald and the Boston Journal at various points. For four years, Gruening was, consecutively, managing editor of the Boston Evening Traveller and the New York Tribune. After serving in World War I, Gruening became the editor of The Nation from 1920 to 1923 and the editor of the New York Post for four months in 1934. During his time in New York, he also worked for the Spanish-language publication La Prensa.

== Political career ==
Intrigued with New Deal politics, he switched careers. Gruening was appointed to the U.S. delegation to the 7th Inter-American Conference in 1933, Director of the Division of Territories and Island Possessions of the Department of the Interior, 1934–1939, and Administrator of the Puerto Rico Reconstruction Administration, 1935–1937. He was a member of the Alaska International Highway Commission from 1938 to 1942. In 1939, Gruening was appointed Governor of the Territory of Alaska, and served in that position for 13 1/2 years. He was a delegate to the Democratic National Conventions of 1952, 1956, and 1960, and was elected to the United States Senate in 1958, serving for 10 years.

One of Gruening's areas of expertise was Mexico. In 1928, he published the most comprehensive book on the country, which is still recommended by the U.S. State Department and Mexican officials today. For this work, the best written by a non-Mexican on Mexico, he received the Order of the Aztec Eagle from the Mexican government.

Despite having been born outside of Alaska, he was a fervent supporter of the territory's statehood, serving as one of its first senators after statehood. He gave the keynote speech in 1955 at the Alaskan Constitutional Convention entitled "Let Us End American Colonialism!" in which he outlined the ways in which the United States mirrored the actions of the British Empire in North America before the Revolutionary War in relation to the territory of Alaska. Gruening argued Alaska was a colony of the U.S., but had been promised statehood from its purchase. With his assistance and support, Alaska entered the Union four years later, in 1959.

== Governorship ==
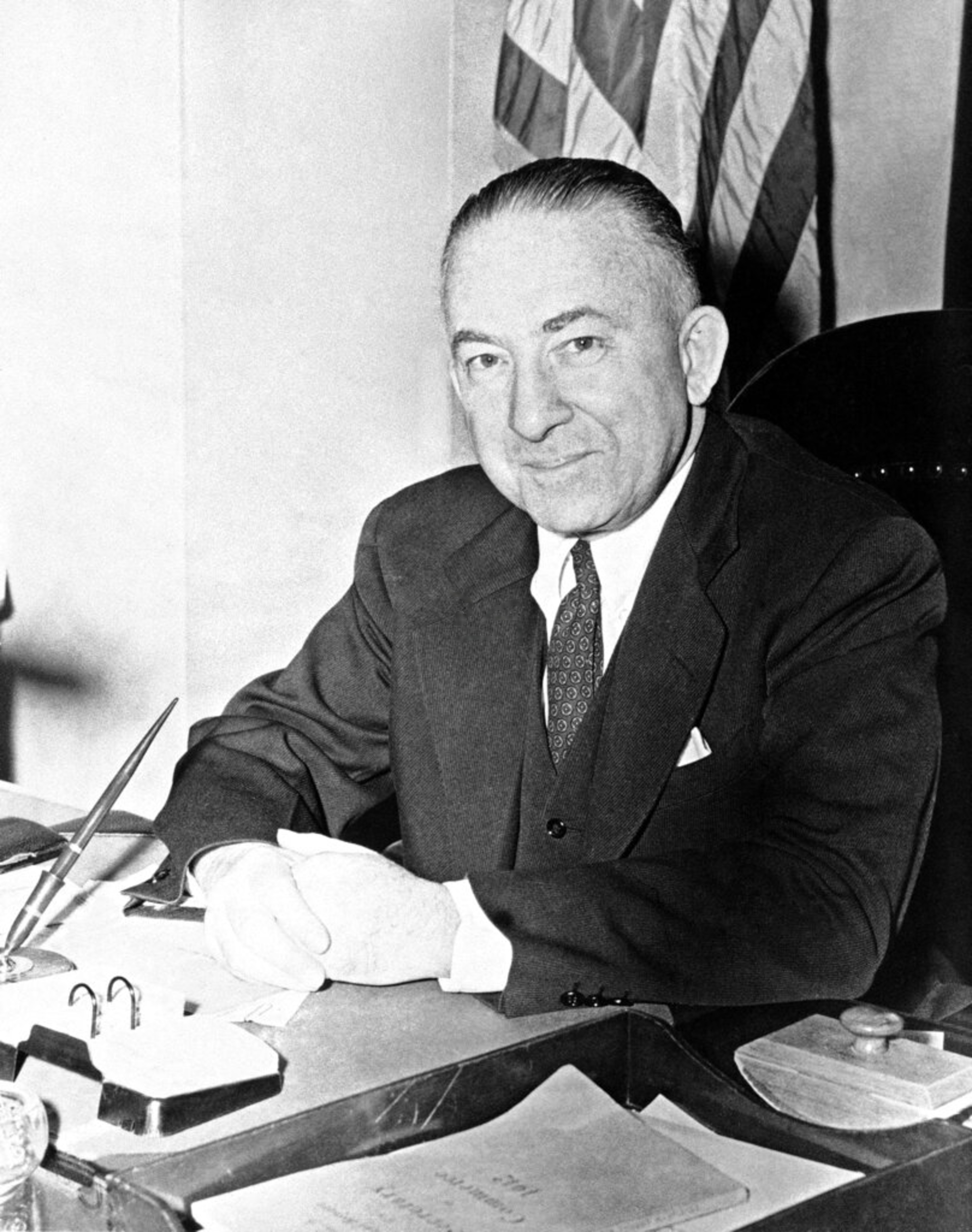
Official portrait of Gruening as Governor in 1943

Ernest Gruening served as the 7th governor of the Alaskan territory from 1939 to 1953. During his term, he continued to write letters to the editor at The New Republic. One such letter examined that publication's recent discussion of state legislation affecting veterans. Gruening's letter included information on the steps taken by his territorial government benefiting veterans in the state. His plan, the Territorial Veterans' Act, provided for loans up to $10,000 for veterans at a four percent interest rate, half the established rate in Alaska of eight percent.

A significant issue during Gruening's tenure as territorial governor, particularly in 1946, was a tuberculosis rate so high it caused him to declare a state of emergency. The territory had as many as 4000 patients and only 289 hospital beds. Alaska spent one-tenth of its annual budget increasing awareness about TB, yet the death rate was still eight times the United States average.

Another concern during Gruening's time as governor was the possible effect on wildlife caused by large numbers of soldiers arriving prior to the United States entry into World War II, and which would only increase during the conflict. While he fully supported military presence and activities, after so many soldiers had been in the state long enough to gain resident hunting licenses (significantly cheaper than nonresident licenses) Gruening worried wildlife populations would suffer. Because of this, he began to focus on instituting new regulations to protect Alaska's animals and environment from the over-harvesting that he saw as inevitable.

=== World War II ===
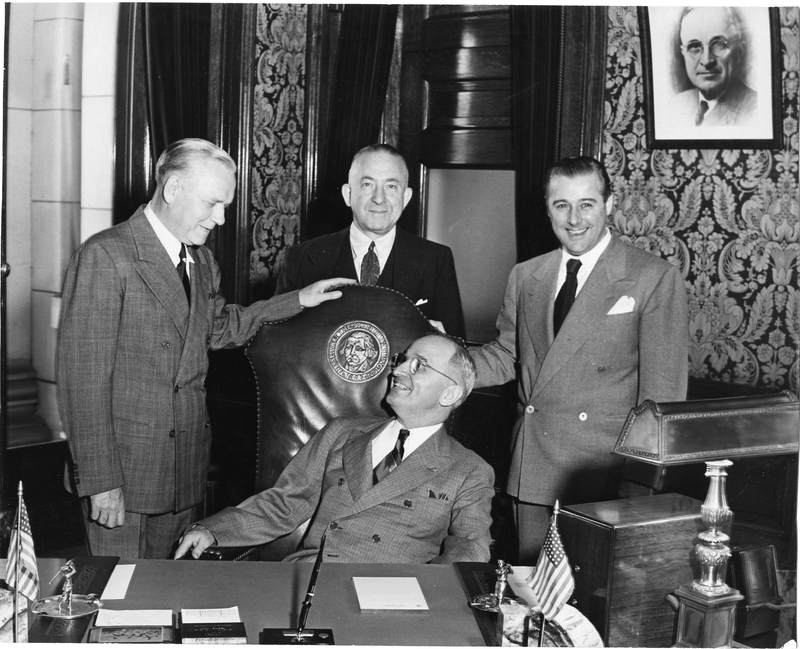
Gruening with Monrad Wallgren, Warren Magnuson & Harry S. Truman in June 1945

In the spring of 1940, Nazi Germany under Adolf Hitler invaded Norway, Denmark, the Netherlands, Belgium, and France. Meanwhile, in September of that year, the Japanese invaded and conquered French Indochina. There had been growing concern in Alaska over the lack of military defense, as it was vulnerable to Axis invasion. Gruening had been pushing for defense facilities in Alaska since his appointment to the governorship, and because of recent actions from Germany and Japan, Congress designated funds to build army forts and airfields in the territory. By 1941, there were 3,000 U.S. Armed Forces soldiers stationed around Alaska. With the attack on Pearl Harbor, Gruening prepared for Alaska to be next. Plans were made for blackouts and civilian defense forces, whose first assignment was "around-the-clock protection for radio stations, telephone exchanges, oil tanks, public utilities, and docks, and to be vigilant against possible sabotage." The armed forces expanded their operations in Alaska, slowly moving toward the Aleutian Chain, the most accessible route from Asia. The Japanese did reach Alaska in June 1942, bombing Dutch Harbor and landing on the islands of Attu and Kiska, the only continental U.S. locations captured in World War II.

In connection with World War II but preceding U.S. involvement, Interior Secretary Harold L. Ickes developed a plan to resettle refugees fleeing the European continent in sparsely populated Alaska. Many of Alaska's infrastructure difficulties were caused by low population, both in overall numbers and density. An influx of immigrants would help solve some of the problems, but Gruening, Alaskans, and 64.7% of Americans, as a Fortune survey in 1938 showed, opposed accepting more immigrants and moving them to Alaska. While that suggestion was gaining force in 1938, before Gruening became the territorial governor, it continued throughout World War II.

Gruening was instrumental in passing America's first anti-discrimination law, the Alaska Equal Rights Act of 1945.

== U.S. Senate ==
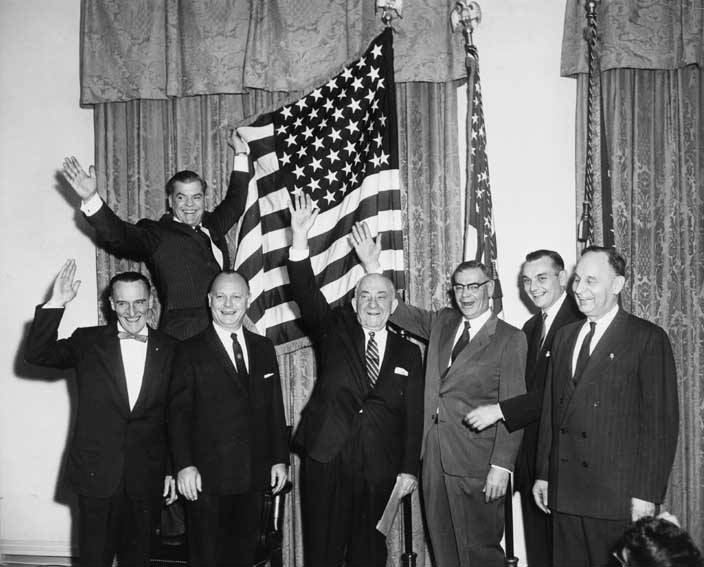
Gruening, (bottom, third from left), celebrating Alaska Statehood next to a 49 star U.S. Flag, held by Robert Atwood.

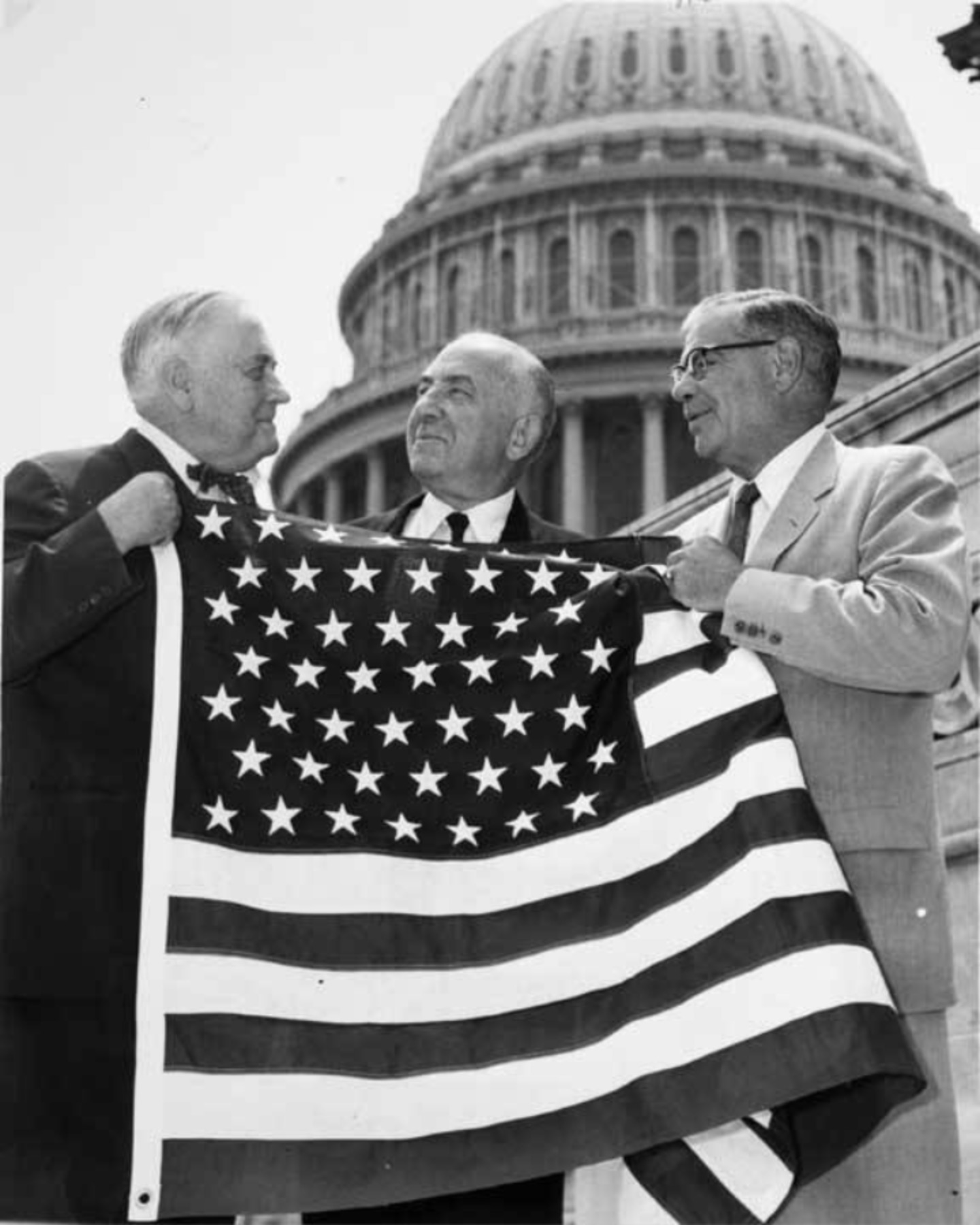
Gruening & Bob Bartlett hold the 49 star U.S. Flag after the admission of Alaska as the 49th state.

Gruening served Alaska in the United States Senate from January 3, 1959 (the day that Alaska became the 49th state to join the Union) to January 3, 1969 (the tenth anniversary of statehood), defeating Territorial Governor Mike Stepovich for the seat in 1958. He then defeated future U.S. Senator Ted Stevens in 1962, winning re-election to a full term. He was defeated for re-election in 1968 by fellow Democrat Mike Gravel. When Gravel won the Democratic primary, Gruening ran in the general election as an independent, taking third place, behind Gravel and former Anchorage mayor Republican Elmer E. Rasmuson. He continued his active political involvement as president of an investment firm and as a legislative consultant. He died on June 26, 1974.

After the 1964 Alaska earthquake, Gruening was part of the efforts to rebuild Anchorage, along with Representative Ralph Rivers, Governor Bill Egan and Senator Bob Bartlett.

Gruening's most notable act as an officeholder was being one of only two senators, along with Wayne Morse of Oregon, to vote against the Gulf of Tonkin Resolution which passed on August 7, 1964. It authorized an expansion of U.S. involvement in the Vietnam War. He was also responsible for introducing a set of congressional resolutions to establish the nationwide 911 number.

In 2006, Norman Jacques, a former state senator from Rhode Island, called the Anchorage Daily News saying he was putting the chair used by Gruening on the U.S. Senate floor up for auction. When Gruening left, he was given the option to buy his seat, and he did. It sat in his dining room, unused as it was so uncomfortable. The friendship that developed between Gruening and Jacques from the time Jacques was protesting against the Vietnam War draft made him present at the sale of some of Gruening's property after his death and acquire the chair. At the time of the call, Jacques was moving and felt his Winnebago was "no place for a chair of such stature" and that it should be returned to Alaska.

=== Vietnam War ===
In the May 5, 1969 issue of The Nation, Ernest Gruening wrote: "It is, and for some time has been, obvious that the most important issue facing our nation is to get out of the war in Southeast Asia. All our other issues and problems are slighted, impaired and unresolved until we halt the fighting, stop the... continuing drain of blood and treasure, and turn to the long-neglected and pressing needs at home."

Gruening's negative opinion on the Vietnam War is clearly summarized here; he was a vocal opponent of the war throughout U.S. presence in Southeast Asia at the time. In the article, Gruening notes that his 30-page speech, including exhibits, on March 10, 1964, was the first piece of opposition out of Congress regarding the Vietnam War. He was against the bloodshed, against the expense, against the number of refugees resulting from combat, and against how it had changed the worldview on the morality of the United States. He focused on combatting the mindset that since the U.S. was involved in Vietnam, it might as well stay. Gruening suggested that the U.S. entrance into the Southeast Asian theatre was misguided and called for an apology.

In an article about his debate with Assistant Secretary of State for Far Eastern Affairs William P. Bundy regarding Vietnam, Gruening continued the fight against U.S. involvement in the region and its consequences by stating, "After you have been bombing villagers with napalm, it's going to be very difficult to persuade people that you are their friend."

Isaac Camacho, who became the first American to escape from a Viet Cong POW camp, said that whilst he was a prisoner, Gruening's anti-war rhetoric was used by his VC interrogators as propaganda. Camacho said that he found this "very demoralizing."

== Family ==
While Gruening was not an Alaska resident when he was appointed governor, he lived in Alaska after leaving office. Remaining in Juneau, he spent most of his later years living with his wife, Dorothy, in a cabin at Mile 26 of the Glacier Highway. The cabin is currently listed on the National Register of Historic Places.

Though only one of his three sons reached adulthood, Gruening's descendants have managed to establish roots in Alaska after him, mostly in Juneau. In 1980, Gruening's grandson, Clark Gruening (who grew up in Juneau but moved to Anchorage following college, serving from there for two terms in the Alaska House of Representatives), defeated incumbent Gravel for the Democratic nomination in the U.S. Senate primary.

Another grandson, Winthrop H. "Win" Gruening, was the longtime head of The Alaska Committee, organized in Juneau in 1995 to lobby for keeping Juneau as Alaska's capital. Win Gruening also had a long career in banking in Juneau, originally with B. M. Behrends Bank, which called itself the oldest bank in Alaska prior to being absorbed by KeyBank, and with KeyBank following the acquisition. His daughter, Caroline Gruening, enjoyed success in basketball, playing guard for Juneau-Douglas High School and Santa Clara University.

== Tributes ==
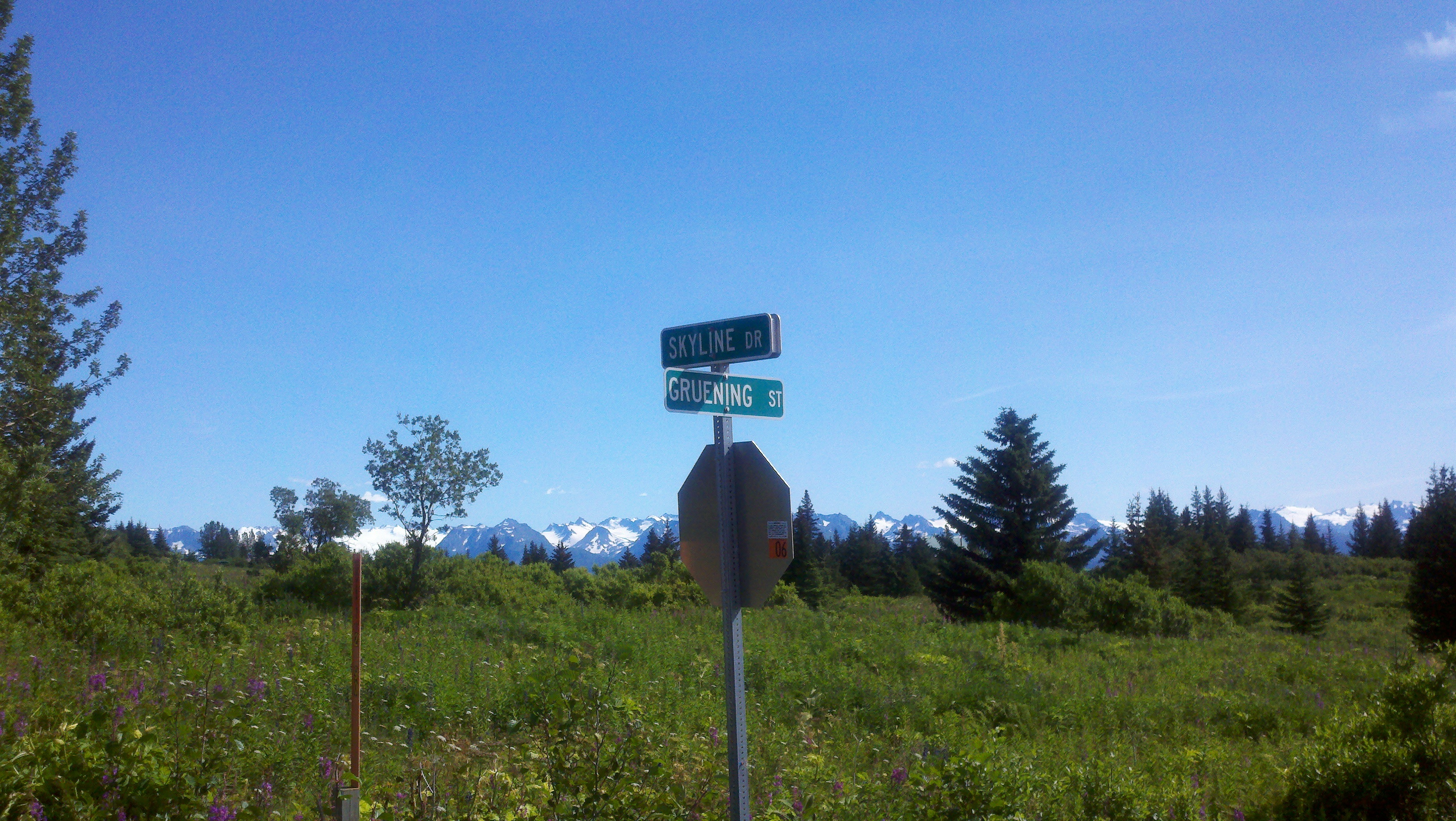
Gruening Street in Homer, one of several communities throughout Alaska which has a street named for Gruening.

The Ernest Gruening Building, a classroom building on the University of Alaska Fairbanks campus, is named in his honor. The structure is eight stories tall and 72,000 square feet, making it the first on the college campus to be over three stories. In 1977, Alaska donated a statue of Ernest Gruening to the United States Capitol's National Statuary Hall Collection. Ernest Gruening Middle School in the Eagle River community of Anchorage, Alaska is named in his honor. Numerous roads and streets in Alaska are named for him as well. As per his wishes, his cremated ashes were scattered on Mount Ernest Gruening near his Alaska home.

== See also ==
Political offices
Preceded by John Troy	Governor of Alaska; 1939–1953	Succeeded by Frank Heintzleman
U.S. Senate
New seat	U.S. Shadow Senator (Class 3) from the Alaska Territory; 1956–1959; Served alongside: William A. Egan	Succeeded by Himself as U.S. Senator
Preceded by Himself as Shadow Senator	U.S. Senator (Class 3) from Alaska; 1959–1969; Served alongside: Bob Bartlett, Ted Stevens	Succeeded by Mike Gravel
Party political offices
First	Democratic nominee for U.S. Senator from Alaska (Class 3); 1958, 1962	Succeeded by Mike Gravel
