= Alaskan of the Year awards =

Alaskan of the Year awards are an Alaska tradition dating from 1967.

Alaskan of the Year, Inc., arose out of a 60th birthday party that year, to honor Robert Atwood, publisher of the Anchorage Times. Initially its only award was "Alaskan of the Year", but the "Governor's Award", the "Denali Award", and the "With Great Respect Award" were in turn added to its repertoire. The corporation gave awards until 2002, when decreased membership made continuation impracticable.

Alaskan of the Year awards have since become projects of the Alaska State Chamber of Commerce and of the Governor's Committee on Employment and Rehabilitation for People with Disabilities.

== Award winners ==
=== Alaskan of the Year, Inc. awards ===
- 1967 – Robert Bruce Atwood
- 1969 – Walter Hickel
- 1971 – William A. Egan
- 1972 – Robert Campbell Reeve
- 1974 – Ted Stevens
- 1977 – Fred Machetanz
- 1978 – John Thomas Kelsey
- 1981 – Evangeline Atwood
  - 1987 – Rick Mystrom (Denali Award)
- 1988 – William J. Tobin
- 1991 – Lew Williams, Jr.
- 1994 – Jay S. Hammond
- 1995 – Joe Redington
- 1997 – Archbishop Francis Hurley
- 1998 – Al Swalling
- 1999 – Edward B. Rasmuson
  - 1999 – Syun-Ichi Akasofu (Denali Award)
- 2000 – Ted Stevens (awarded Alaskan of the Century for the occasion)
- 2001 – Augie Hiebert
  - 2001 – Michael Oleksa (Denali Award)
- [?] – Mahala Ashley Dickerson

=== Alaska State Chamber of Commerce awards ===
This event was eventually named the William A. Egan Alaskan of the Year Award.

- 2008 – Marc Langland
- 2009 – John Shively
- 2010 – Helvi Sandvik
- 2012 – Joseph E. Usibelli Jr.
- 2013 – Nominees: Jim Doyle, Steve Borell, Margy Johnson

=== Governor's Committee on Employment awards ===
- 2008 – Dan Bigley
