= Zhenyu Yue =

Chinese medical researcher

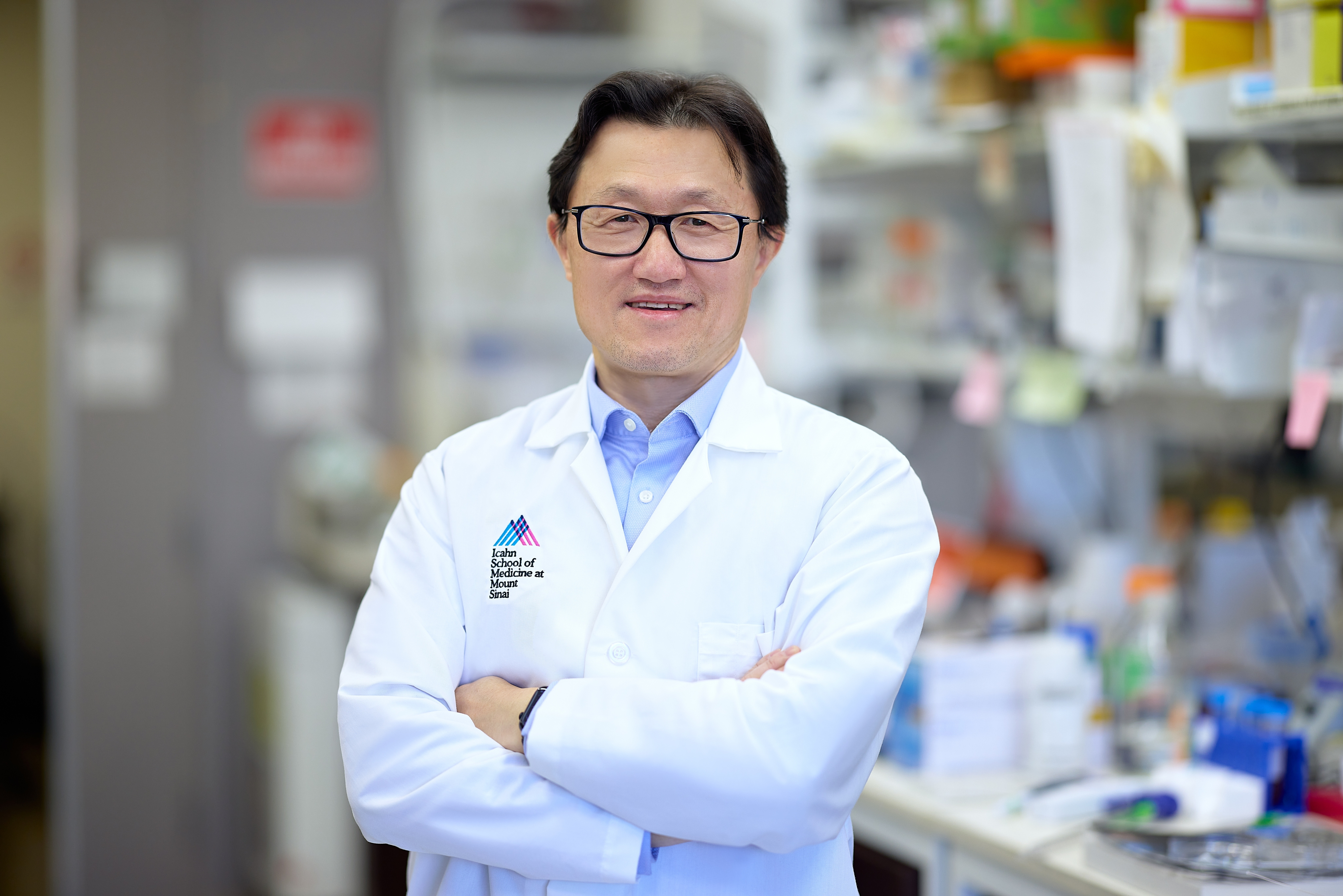
- Education: Rutgers, UMDNJ–Robert Wood Johnson Medical School (PhD); Chinese Academy of Sciences (MS); Wuhan University (BS)
- Known for: Beclin 1 autophagy neuronal and microglial autophagy
- Scientific career
- Fields: Neuroscience
- Workplaces: Icahn School of Medicine at Mount Sinai
- Doctoral advisor: Aaron J Shatkin
- Other academic advisors: Nathanial Heintz
- Website: https://labs.icahn.mssm.edu/yuelab/ https://profiles.icahn.mssm.edu/zhenyu-yue

Zhenyu Yue is a neuroscientist who studies cellular and molecular mechanisms of neurological disorders, with an emphasis on autophagy–lysosome biology in neurons and glia. He holds the Alex and Shirley Aidekman Research Professorship and is Professor of Neurology and Neuroscience at the Icahn School of Medicine at Mount Sinai, where he directs the Center for Parkinson's Disease Neurobiology and leads a laboratory investigating mechanisms of proteostasis in central nervous system, neuronal vulnerability, cellular senescence, and neuroinflammation.

== Education and career ==
Yue received a B.S. in cell biology from Wuhan University and an M.S. in vertebrate genetics from the Institute of Hydrobiology, Chinese Academy of Sciences.

He earned a Ph.D. in molecular biology and biochemistry from UMDNJ–Robert Wood Johnson Medical School (now part of Rutgers) and trained as a postdoctoral fellow in molecular biology and neuroscience at The Rockefeller University as a Howard Hughes Medical Institute postdoctoral fellow. Early in his career he held research and faculty positions in China before joining Mount Sinai, where he progressed from assistant professor to full professor and laboratory director.

Yue has held successive academic appointments at the Icahn School of Medicine at Mount Sinai, including Director of Basic and Translational Research in Movement Disorders, Professor of Neurology and Neuroscience, and (since 2022) Director of the Center for Parkinson's Disease Neurobiology.

He also serves as principal investigator on major research programmes, including an NIH-supported Udall Center for Parkinson's Disease Research at Mount Sinai.

== Research and career ==
Zhenyu Yue's research focuses on the molecular and cellular mechanisms underlying neurodegenerative diseases, particularly Parkinson's disease and Alzheimer's disease.

His work has been influential in elucidating the role of autophagy, a cellular process responsible for degrading and recycling intracellular components in maintaining neuronal health. Yue reported the first mammalian autophagy gene (BECN1) function in vivo. Yue's laboratory identified key regulators of autophagy within the Beclin 1–hVPS34 complex (class III PI3K), including Atg14L, Rubicon, and NRBF2, which are essential for controlling autophagosome formation and maturation.

Yue and his collaborators have also investigated autophagy receptors involved in neurodegenerative and psychiatric disorders. Their studies on SQSTM1/p62 clarified its role in clearing polyubiquitinated protein aggregates associated with Lewy bodies, tau tangles, and huntingtin inclusions.

More recently, his group identified AKAP11— a significant genetic risk factor for bipolar disorder and schizophrenia—as an autophagy receptor that regulates PKA-RI complex degradation through autophagy and a modulator of GSK3 activity.

His laboratory has investigated molecular pathways relevant to Parkinson's disease, including those involving LRRK2 and synaptojanin-1. Yue's research demonstrated that vitamin B12 can modulate LRRK2 kinase activity through allosteric regulation. The Yue Lab integrates multidisciplinary strategies to map the cell-type-specific transcriptomic landscape of the human substantia nigra, elucidate the mechanisms of neuronal subtype-specific vulnerability, and develop molecular biomarkers of Parkinson's disease.

== Awards ==
- In 2008, Yue was honored with the Faculty Council Award for Academic Excellence by Mount Sinai.
- Yue holds the Alex and Shirley Aidekman Family Neurological Research Professorship at Mount Sinai.
- Yue has been a recipient of the Sundaram Research Scholar Award from the Mount Sinai Medical Center in 2017, 2018, and 2019.
- Yue has been a member of Sigma Xi, The Scientific Research Honor Society, since March 2024.

== Selected publications ==
- Yue, Z.; Maldonado, E.; Pillutla, R.; Cho, H.; Reinberg, D.; Shatkin, A. J. (1997-11-25). "Mammalian capping enzyme complements mutant Saccharomyces cerevisiae lacking mRNA guanylyltransferase and selectively binds the elongating form of RNA polymerase II". Proceedings of the National Academy of Sciences of the United States of America. 94 (24): 12898–12903. Bibcode:1997PNAS...9412898Y. doi:10.1073/pnas.94.24.12898. ISSN 0027-8424. PMC 24235. PMID 9371772.
- Yue, Zhenyu; Horton, Antony; Bravin, Monica; DeJager, Philip L.; Selimi, Fekrije; Heintz, Nathaniel (2002-08-29). "A novel protein complex linking the delta 2 glutamate receptor and autophagy: implications for neurodegeneration in lurcher mice". Neuron. 35 (5): 921–933. doi:10.1016/s0896-6273(02)00861-9. ISSN 0896-6273. PMID 12372286.
- Yue, Zhenyu; Jin, Shengkan; Yang, Chingwen; Levine, Arnold J.; Heintz, Nathaniel (2003-12-09). "Beclin 1, an autophagy gene essential for early embryonic development, is a haploinsufficient tumor suppressor". Proceedings of the National Academy of Sciences of the United States of America. 100 (25): 15077–15082. Bibcode:2003PNAS..10015077Y. doi:10.1073/pnas.2436255100. ISSN 0027-8424. PMC 299911. PMID 14657337.
- Komatsu, Masaaki; Waguri, Satoshi; Koike, Masato; Sou, Yu-Shin; Ueno, Takashi; Hara, Taichi; Mizushima, Noboru; Iwata, Jun-Ichi; Ezaki, Junji; Murata, Shigeo; Hamazaki, Jun; Nishito, Yasumasa; Iemura, Shun-Ichiro; Natsume, Tohru; Yanagawa, Toru (2007-12-14). "Homeostatic levels of p62 control cytoplasmic inclusion body formation in autophagy-deficient mice". Cell. 131 (6): 1149–1163. Bibcode:2007Cell..131.1149K. doi:10.1016/j.cell.2007.10.035. ISSN 0092-8674. PMID 18083104.
- Zhong, Yun; Wang, Qing Jun; Li, Xianting; Yan, Ying; Backer, Jonathan M.; Chait, Brian T.; Heintz, Nathaniel; Yue, Zhenyu (April 2009). "Distinct regulation of autophagic activity by Atg14L and Rubicon associated with Beclin 1-phosphatidylinositol-3-kinase complex". Nature Cell Biology. 11 (4): 468–476. doi:10.1038/ncb1854. ISSN 1476-4679. PMC 2664389. PMID 19270693.
- Li, Xianting; Patel, Jyoti C.; Wang, Jing; Avshalumov, Marat V.; Nicholson, Charles; Buxbaum, Joseph D.; Elder, Gregory A.; Rice, Margaret E.; Yue, Zhenyu (2010-02-03). "Enhanced Striatal Dopamine Transmission and Motor Performance with LRRK2 Overexpression in Mice Is Eliminated by Familial Parkinson's Disease Mutation G2019S". The Journal of Neuroscience. 30 (5): 1788–1797. doi:10.1523/JNEUROSCI.5604-09.2010. ISSN 0270-6474. PMC 2858426. PMID 20130188.
- Lu, Jiahong; He, Liqiang; Behrends, Christian; Araki, Masatake; Araki, Kimi; Jun Wang, Qing; Catanzaro, Joseph M.; Friedman, Scott L.; Zong, Wei-Xing; Fiel, M. Isabel; Li, Min; Yue, Zhenyu (2014-05-22). "NRBF2 regulates autophagy and prevents liver injury by modulating Atg14L-linked phosphatidylinositol-3 kinase III activity". Nature Communications. 5 3920. Bibcode:2014NatCo...5.3920L. doi:10.1038/ncomms4920. ISSN 2041-1723. PMC 4376476. PMID 24849286.
- Grapin, C. (1989). "[Treatment of anomalies associated with ectopies]". Chirurgie Pédiatrique. 30 (3): 164. ISSN 0180-5738. PMID 2572348.
- Wold, Mitchell S.; Lim, Junghyun; Lachance, Véronik; Deng, Zhiqiang; Yue, Zhenyu (2016-12-09). "ULK1-mediated phosphorylation of ATG14 promotes autophagy and is impaired in Huntington's disease models". Molecular Neurodegeneration. 11 (1): 76. doi:10.1186/s13024-016-0141-0. ISSN 1750-1326. PMC 5148922. PMID 27938392.
- Pan, Ping-Yue; Li, Xianting; Wang, Jing; Powell, James; Wang, Qian; Zhang, Yuanxi; Chen, Zhaoyu; Wicinski, Bridget; Hof, Patrick; Ryan, Timothy A.; Yue, Zhenyu (2017-11-22). "Parkinson's Disease-Associated LRRK2 Hyperactive Kinase Mutant Disrupts Synaptic Vesicle Trafficking in Ventral Midbrain Neurons". The Journal of Neuroscience. 37 (47): 11366–11376. doi:10.1523/JNEUROSCI.0964-17.2017. ISSN 1529-2401. PMC 5700420. PMID 29054882.
- Schaffner, Adam; Li, Xianting; Gomez-Llorente, Yacob; Leandrou, Emmanouela; Memou, Anna; Clemente, Nicolina; Yao, Chen; Afsari, Farinaz; Zhi, Lianteng; Pan, Nina; Morohashi, Keita; Hua, Xiaoluan; Zhou, Ming-Ming; Wang, Chunyu; Zhang, Hui (April 2019). "Vitamin B12 modulates Parkinson's disease LRRK2 kinase activity through allosteric regulation and confers neuroprotection". Cell Research. 29 (4): 313–329. doi:10.1038/s41422-019-0153-8. ISSN 1748-7838. PMC 6462009. PMID 30858560.
- Deng, Zhiqiang; Lim, Junghyun; Wang, Qian; Purtell, Kerry; Wu, Shuai; Palomo, Gloria M.; Tan, Haiyan; Manfredi, Giovanni; Zhao, Yanxiang; Peng, Junmin; Hu, Bo; Chen, Shi; Yue, Zhenyu (May 2020). "ALS-FTLD-linked mutations of SQSTM1/p62 disrupt selective autophagy and NFE2L2/NRF2 anti-oxidative stress pathway". Autophagy. 16 (5): 917–931. doi:10.1080/15548627.2019.1644076. ISSN 1554-8635. PMC 7144840. PMID 31362587.
- Deng, Zhiqiang; Li, Xianting; Blanca Ramirez, Marian; Purtell, Kerry; Choi, Insup; Lu, Jia-Hong; Yu, Qin; Yue, Zhenyu (2021-04-06). "Selective autophagy of AKAP11 activates cAMP/PKA to fuel mitochondrial metabolism and tumor cell growth". Proceedings of the National Academy of Sciences of the United States of America. 118 (14) e2020215118. Bibcode:2021PNAS..11820215D. doi:10.1073/pnas.2020215118. ISSN 1091-6490. PMC 8040602. PMID 33785595.
- Choi, Insup; Wang, Minghui; Yoo, Seungyeul; Xu, Peng; Seegobin, Steven P.; Li, Xianting; Han, Xian; Wang, Qian; Peng, Junmin; Zhang, Bin; Yue, Zhenyu (July 2023). "Autophagy enables microglia to engage amyloid plaques and prevents microglial senescence". Nature Cell Biology. 25 (7): 963–974. doi:10.1038/s41556-023-01158-0. ISSN 1476-4679. PMC 10950302. PMID 37231161.
- Rolak, L. A. (October 1987). "Copolymer-I therapy for multiple sclerosis". Clinical Neuropharmacology. 10 (5): 389–396. doi:10.1097/00002826-198710000-00001. ISSN 0362-5664. PMID 2972360.
- Zhou, Xiaoting; Lee, You-Kyung; Li, Xianting; Kim, Henry; Sanchez-Priego, Carlos; Han, Xian; Tan, Haiyan; Zhou, Suiping; Fu, Yingxue (2022-12-04). "Integrated proteomics reveals the landscape of autophagy degradation in human neurons and autophagy receptors regulating neuronal activity". bioRxiv 10.1101/2022.12.04.519029.

== Personal life ==
Yue has been married to Yuko Kawai. They have two children.
