= Causes of Parkinson's disease =

Factors causing Parkinson's disease

Parkinson's disease (PD) is a neurodegenerative disorder that progresses over time, marked by bradykinesia (slowed movements), tremor (rhythmic shaking), and stiffness. As the condition worsens, patients may experience postural instability, finding it difficult to balance and maintain upright posture. Worldwide, Parkinson's disease affects around 3% people over 65 years of age. PD's incidence and prevalence varies widely across geographic regions and shows spatial clustering, including higher rates in North America and Europe than in Asia and Africa.

Parkinson's disease (PD) involves the gradual degeneration of dopamine producing neurons in a brain region called the substantia nigra and other related cell groups in the brainstem. This is accompanied by the accumulation of misfolded proteins such as alpha-synuclein. Alpha-synuclein is normally found in the presynaptic terminals of neurons. If alpha-synuclein is mis-folded and not cleared from cells by cellular degradation systems, it can build up to form clumps of proteins called Lewy bodies and Lewy neurites. Accumulation stimulates the release of pro-inflammatory molecules by the microglia, a protective response that can cause inflammation and neuronal damage if it becomes chronic. Neuroinflammation causes the blood-brain barrier (BBB) to become more permeable, allowing dangerous substances and inflammatory cells to enter the brain and interfere with metabolic functions. Dysfunction in mitochondria, which are central to cellular energy production, increases oxidative stress and cell death. Protein aggregation, inflammation and metabolic dysregulation in lysosomal, endosomal, and mitochondrial systems are interconnected mechanisms which create a cycle of inflammation, cellular stress and damage in Parkinson's disease.

PD has no single cause: rather, genetic and environmental factors interact and affect critical cellular processes in a complex interplay. Genetically, from 15 to 25% of people with PD report familial connections who have PD, and 10–20% report a first-degree relative with PD. PD risk is increased by variations in specific genes, many of which have been linked to specific neural mechanisms. Familial parkinsonism involving an autosomal dominant or recessive pattern commonly results in early-onset PD. Research has indicated that the risk of Parkinson's disease (PD) is increased by mutations in the genes encoding leucine-rich repeat kinase 2 (LRRK2), Parkinson's disease-associated deglycase (PARK7), PRKN, PINK1, and SNCA (alpha-synuclein).

The remaining 80-90% of PD cases are classified as sporadic or idiopathic, meaning no clear single cause or mechanism has been determined for them. The cumulative effects of many different environmental exposures over a lifetime interact with underlying genetic factors to influence PD development and progression. Both risk factors and protective factors are known to relate to Parkinson's disease. Exposures to pesticides, metals, solvents, other toxicants and air pollution are increasingly seen as major risk factors in PD development. The brain is particularly vulnerable to chemicals that are able to cross the blood-brain barrier. Body-first and brain-first models of Parkinson's disease propose that there are two distinct avenues through which environmental toxicants can enter the nervous system: (1) ingested into the gut and affecting the enteric nervous system (body-first), or (2) inhaled through the nose and affecting the olfactory bulb (brain-first). The World Health Organization (WHO) recommends reducing exposure to environmental factors associated with PD, including pesticides, trichloroethylene (TCE), and air pollution. Traumatic brain injury and Type 2 diabetes are additional risk factors. Exercise, coffee consumption, and diets rich in fruits, vegetables, whole grains, and fish are protective factors associated with lower risk of PD.

== Genetic factors ==
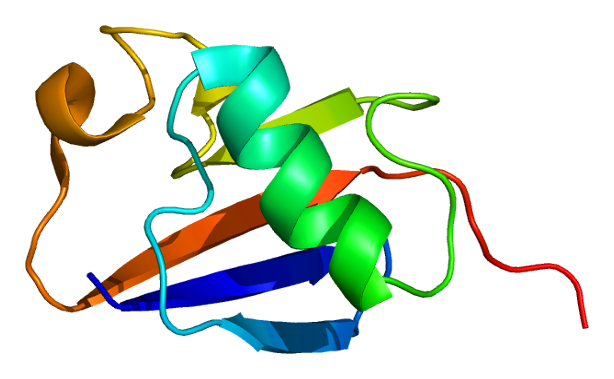
PDB rendering of Parkin (ligase)

Traditionally, Parkinson's disease has been considered a non-genetic disorder. However, between 15 and 25% of people with PD report familial connections who have PD, and from 10 to 20% have a first-degree relative with PD. No single-gene mutation in PD causes PD, but multiple genetic factors can increase susceptibility and the risk of developing either familial or sporadic PD. More penetrant PD mutations with a higher risk of developing the disease, tend to be rare but are often associated with familial PD (e.g. rare SNCA variants). A second group of variants (including GBA and LRRK2 variants) are uncommon and carry an intermediate level of risk in a significant minority of PD cases. A third group of genetic variants occur often but carry low risk.

Unequivocal links to PD pathogenesis have been found for mutations in at least six genes: LRRK2, SNCA, and VPS35 (dominant forms) and PRKN/Parkin, PINK1, and PARK7/DJ1 (recessive forms). The most extensively studied PD-related genes are LRRK2 and SNCA.

At least 16 genes display "causal" variants associated with genetic predisposition for PD, through higher familial inheritance of PD or development of early-onset PD symptoms. An additional 44 novel risk loci have been associated with sporadic PD.

Both autosomal dominant and autosomal recessive gene mutations have been implicated in the development of PD. Autosomal dominant genes include SNCA (PARK1, PARK4, NCAP) and VPS35 (PARK17, MEM3), which are rare but highly penetrant, and CHCHD2. LRRK2 (PARK8, DARDARIN) and GBA (GBA1) are pathogenic but have variable penetrance. Dominant genes associated with PD but now believed unlikely to be pathogenic include HTRA2, UCHL1 (PARK5), GIGYF2 (PARK11), and EIF4G1. Autosomal recessive genes include PRKN (PARK2, PARKIN), PINK1 (PARK6), PARK7 (DJ-1), ATP13A2 (PARK9), PLA2G6 (PARK14, IPLA2), FBXO7 (PARK15, FBX7), DNAJC6 (PARK19, DJC6), SYNJ1 (PARK20), and VPS13C (PARK23).

Most common risk genes (like GBA) affect both sexes equally. The overall genetic risk for PD appears to be similar for males and females. However, there are sex- and gender-related differences between men and women in PD clinical features, disease development and response to treatment. Men are consistently found to have a higher occurrence of Parkinson's disease, with an estimated prevalence rate 1.5 times greater among males than females across all ages. These differences appear to reflect complex interactions among hormones, gene regulation, and other biological, environmental and sociocultural factors. Some sex-linked factors may differently affect brain activity and dopamine pathways. In adult males, the SRY gene (Sex-determining Region on the Y chromosome) is involved in regulation of dopamine, and SRY overactivity may increase PD risk. In women, hormones such as estrogen have been suggested to have a protective effect against PD, but little research has been done.

=== Autosomal dominant genes ===
==== SNCA gene ====
The SNCA gene encodes alpha-synuclein. The role of the SNCA gene is significant in PD because the alpha-synuclein protein is the main component of Lewy bodies, which appear as a primary biomarker in the disease. Missense mutations of the gene (in which a single nucleotide is changed), and duplications and triplications of the locus containing it, have been found in different groups with familial PD. Level of alpha-synuclein expression correlates with disease onset and progression, with SNCA gene triplication advancing earlier and faster than duplication. Missense mutations in SNCA are rare. On the other hand, multiplications of the SNCA locus account for around 2% of familial cases. Multiplications have been found in asymptomatic carriers, which indicate that penetrance is incomplete or age-dependent.

==== LRRK2 gene ====
The LRRK2 gene (PARK8) encodes for the protein leucine-rich repeat kinase 2 (LRRK2/dardarin). Mutations in the LRRK2 gene account for the majority of autosomal-dominant Parkinson's disease cases. These mutations are the most common known cause of familial and sporadic PD, accounting for approximately 5% of individuals with a family history of the disease and 1% of apparently sporadic cases.

Many individuals carrying LRRK2 mutations do not develop PD, and estimates of the likelihood of developing PD vary widely with different mutations. LRRK2 is reported to have over 100 genetic coding variants. Of these, only six (G2019S, I2020T, R1441C/G/H, and Y1699C) have been reliably shown to be pathogenic, based on PD family groupings, and three more (I1372V, R1628P, and G2385R) are suspected to be PD genetic risk factors. The occurrence of LRRK2 variants differs based on population and ethnicity. G2019S is found in most countries, with higher frequency in Ashkenazi Jewish and Berber populations. R1628P and G2385R appear in Asian populations.

LRRK2 is involved in the protein uptake, movement and clearance activities of the endolysosomal system, which degrades and removes unwanted proteins, preventing toxic build-up. LRRK2 and alpha-synuclein interact. Some LRRK2 mutations have been linked to dysfunctional protein degradation and clearance. For example, G2019S mutations appear to reduce the ability to clear alpha-synuclein, the protein which forms Lewy bodies. G2019S may also be linked to tau pathology.

==== VPS35 ====
VPS35 (PARK17, MEM3) is involved in cellular transport mechanisms such as endosomal trafficking, the sorting and recycling of proteins in the cell. Such recycling is essential to normal cell functioning. Normally VPS35 regulates the sorting and transport of proteins controlling mitochondrial fusion and fission. Absence or mutation of VPS35 can cause mitochondrial fragmentation, the accumulation of damaged mitochondria within the cell, and impaired function. The VPS35 D620N mutant further interferes with the activity of PINK1 and PRKN in recycling damaged mitochondria. VPS35 mutations are related to a number of diseases that involve disruptions of normal mitochondrial and retromer activity, including PD. VPS35-related PD is extremely rare.

==== GBA gene ====
The GBA gene is associated with lysosome storage and autophagy. GBA encodes the enzyme glucocerebrosidase (GCase), necessary for breaking down glucosylceramide (GlcCer). Mutations in GBA can cause modifications in GCase protein structure, decreases in GCase activity and protein levels, and the accumulation of GlcCer in the cell. Approximately 5–15% of PD patients have mutations in the GBA gene. Mendelian genetics are not strictly observed in GBA mutations in PD. Both gain-of-function and loss-of-function GBA mutations are associated with increased risk of PD.

GBA is one of a number of pleiotropic genes which have multiple effects in the body, that have been linked to PD risk. Mutations in GBA1 can cause either complete loss‐of‐function and the lysosomal disorder Gaucher's disease, or partial loss‐of‐function with an increased risk for PD. Mutations in EPG5 are implicated in a range of dysfunctions, from severe (Vici syndrome), to moderate (atypical parkinsonism) and mild (typical PD). Microdeletions at 22q11.2 have been variously linked to PD, schizophrenia, and DiGeorge syndrome.

=== Autosomal recessive genes ===
==== PINK1, PARK7, PRKN ====
PINK1 (PARK6), PARK7 (DJ-1), and PRKN (PARK2, PARKIN) are all involved in mitochondrial activity. Mutations in these genes may cause mitochondrial dysfunction, an element of both idiopathic and familial PD.

In addition, the PRKN gene encodes E3 ubiquitin ligase, which is involved in degradation of damaged proteins by ubiquitin. Many different PRKN-related mutations occur, leading to loss of protein or to protein-related loss of function. PRKN is the most common cause of autosomal-recessive PD, accounting for nearly 50% of typical early-onset parkinsonism. PRKN mutations account for 77% of juvenile PD cases.

PINK1 encodes PTEN-induced putative kinase 1, and is the second-most common cause of autosomal-recessive PD.

The PARK7 gene is located on chromosome 1p36 and encodes the DJ-1 protein. The DJ-1 protein is involved in cellular sensing of oxidative stress. DJ-1 related PD is rare, occurring in 0.4% - 1% of patients with early-onset PD.

=== Genes underlying familial Parkinson's disease ===
Genes underlying familial PD
HGNC symbol	Gene	Locus	Function	Mutations	Clinical Presentations	Neuropathology	Age at onset	Inheritance
PARK1/PARK4	SNCA (α-synuclein)	4q21	Unknown synaptic function	Duplications	Idiopathic PD; some postural tremor; slow progression	LBs	Mid 20s – 30	Dominant
	SNCA	4q22	instructions for making a small protein called alpha-synuclei may play a role in maintaining supply of synaptic vesicles in presynaptic terminals; may regulate release of dopamine	Triplications	PD (Parkinson's Disease); PD with dementia;diffuse LBs disease;aggressive course; can develop cognitive dysfunction, autonomic failure, and myoclonus	LBs and Lewy neurites; ± glial inclusions; hippocampal CA2 and CA3 loss	Mid 20s – 30s	
				A53T, A30P E46K	Idiopathic PD; early onset parkinsonism and diffuse LBs	LBs and LNs; ± tau inclusions; amyloid plaques	30–60	
PARK2	Parkin		E3 ubiquitin ligase	200+ possible mutations including: Inactivating somatic mutations; Frequent intragenic deletions	Early onset parkinsonism; slow progression PD	variable presence of LBs	Juvenile to 40	Recessive
PARK5	UCHL1		deubiquitinating enzyme	Missense: Ile93Met	PD; late onset parkinsonism	Unknown; various abnormal protein aggregations	30–50	Dominant
PARK6	PINK1		mitochondrial Ser-Thr Kinase	40+ mutations -Mostly point mutations -Deletions on C-terminus Kinase domain	Parkinsonism	Unknown	30–50	Recessive
PARK7	DJ-1		oxidative stress response?	-10 point mutations including C46A, C53A, C106 & WT regions: Large deletion in L166P	Early onset parkinsonism	Unknown	20–40	Recessive
PARK8	LRRK2 (dardarin)	12q12	unknown protein kinase	G2019S most common	late-onset Parkinson's Disease	Diffuse LBs; LNs; ± tau inclusions; ± amyloid plaques	40–60	Dominant

== Environmental risk factors ==
Exposures to pesticides, metals, solvents (trichloroethylene), other toxicants (carbon disulfide), and air pollution are known factors in the development of Parkinson's disease. The World Health Organization (WHO) recommends reducing exposure to environmental factors associated with PD, including pesticides, trichloroethylene (TCE), and air pollution.

Pesticides, TCE and some air pollutants appear to trigger PD pathology through their effects on key mechanisms involved in mitochondrial dysfunction, oxidative stress, and neuroinflammation. The cumulative effects of many different environmental exposures over a lifetime (the exposome) interact with underlying genetic factors to influence the development and progression of neurodegenerative diseases. The brain is particularly vulnerable to compounds that are able to cross the blood-brain barrier. Body-first and brain-first models of Parkinson's disease indicate possible connections between known environmental risk factors and PD mechanisms. Toxicants such as pesticides, industrial chemicals, and air pollution are usually inhaled, ingested, or both. In the nasal cavity and gut, they engage directly with mucosal surfaces where inflammation can occur. Pathways which can carry inflammation and toxins from the olfactory system and gut to the brain are well established. Key mechanisms are increasingly understood.

=== Pesticides ===
Pesticides include a wide variety of chemical compounds, used in both agriculture and non-agricultural contexts. Globally, roughly 4,000 chemical compounds are officially registered as being designed for biological activity as pesticides. Pesticides are broadly categorized into plant protection products for countering pests and diseases, and biocidal products such as disinfectants, which may be used domestically to control harmful organisms. Agricultural pesticides are further grouped into herbicides (used against plants), fungicides (used against fungi and spores), and insecticides (against insects). The properties targeted by pesticides are often shared by both the intended targets and other non-target species, including humans. Both those working with pesticides and those living near areas of application are at increased risk.

Evidence from epidemiological, animal, and in vitro studies suggests that exposure to pesticides increases the risk for Parkinson's disease. Numerous meta‐analyses and epidemiological studies have reported an increased risk ratio or odds ratio for being exposed to pesticides. PD prevalence is associated with local pesticide use. Length of duration of pesticide exposure is associated with increased PD risk, while high proximity and frequent pesticide exposure are associated with earlier age of onset. Pesticide exposure after diagnosis may accelerate disease progression.

Herbicides such as paraquat, diquat, rotenone and glyphosate are the most clearly established environmental toxicants for PD and are likely causal. Dithiocarbamate fungicides are also associated with increased PD risk. Organochlorine pesticides such as DDT were banned in the United States in 1972; pesticides such as dieldrin are also associated with increased PD risk and still may be used elsewhere. Organophosphates such as chlorpyrifos and diazinon are linked with increased PD risk, and have been banned in the European Union. Concerns have been raised about pyrethroid pesticides such as cypermethrin, which are globally used both agriculturally and domestically, often as a replacement for organophosphates.

Rural living, well-drinking, and farming are all associated with Parkinson's, which may be partly explained by local pesticide exposure through direct contact and contaminated air or ground water. These factors are pertinent to many communities, including Brazilian and South Asian populations. Organochlorine pesticides continue to be associated with increased risk for Parkinson's disease in Asia.

In France, Parkinson's disease was officially recognized as an occupational disease of agricultural workers in 2012. A Decree acknowledging a causal link between pesticides and PD entered into force on 7 May 2013. In March 2024, Germany formally adopted a similar recommendation for the occupational disease category of "Parkinson's Disease caused by pesticides", no longer using the term "idiopathic" PD. Since 2019, the Movement Disorder Society (MDS) has included "regular pesticide exposure" as a risk factor in the MDS research criteria for prodromal Parkinson's disease.

Many pesticides are mitochondrial toxins. Paraquat, for instance, structurally resembles metabolized MPTP, which selectively kills dopaminergic neurons by inhibiting mitochondrial complex 1. It is widely used to model PD. A widely used herbicide, Paraquat has been epidemiologically linked to higher Parkinson's risk, and rodent studies show it causes mitochondrial dysfunction, oxidative stress, and dopaminergic neuron loss. Rotenone, a naturally derived insecticide, inhibits mitochondrial complex 1 and selectively damages dopaminergic neurons in the substantia nigra. Rodent studies show both temporary and chronic exposure can produce Parkinson-like pathology, including enteric nervous system changes. The dithiocarbamate fungicide Maneb, the second most commonly used pesticide in Brazil, interferes with mitochondrial respiration.

==== Environmental–genetic factors ====
There is a relationship between CYP450 gene polymorphisms and pesticide metabolism. Several CYP450 enzymes, including CYP3A4, CYP2B6, CYP2D6 (G1934A), CYP1A1, and CYP1A2, can modify the detoxification or bioactivation of pesticides. The CYP2D6 gene is primarily expressed in the liver and is responsible for the enzyme cytochrome P450 2D6. CYP2D6 is involved in pesticide metabolism and associated with increased risk for Parkinson's disease in populations exposed to pesticides due to occupational use.

=== Metals ===
Heavy metals, such as lead (Pb), manganese (Mn), iron (Fe), copper (Cu), mercury (Hg), aluminum (Al), bismuth (Bi), zinc (Zn) and selenium (Se) have been linked to PD. They cross the blood-brain barrier, and can disrupt cellular mechanisms, leading to neuroinflammation, oxidative stress, and mitochondrial dysfunction. While some metals like manganese are needed in small amounts for healthy cellular functioning, others like lead are considered toxic at any level of exposure.

Lead is considered "one of the most harmful pollutants for human health". Lead-based paint in the United States was banned in 1978. Tetraethyllead was added to gasoline in the United States until the 1990s. As a result, lead was released into the air as part of vehicle exhaust. Lead pipes continue to introduce lead contaminants into water supplies and household water. Following exposure, lead is absorbed into the body where it accumulates in blood, bones, teeth, and soft tissues such as the brain, liver, and kidney. Lead remains in the body and can cause both acute and chronic lead poisoning. Lead is known to damage the central nervous system in a variety of ways, with children being particularly vulnerable. Population studies suggest that higher levels of lead in bone and blood are associated with a higher risk of PD. Lead may be linked to PD through oxidative stress and mitochondrial dysfunction. Regulatory actions and public health measures have contributed to a substantial decrease in the levels of lead exposure measured in the US population since the 1970s.

People can be exposed to manganese (Mn) through inhalation of dust from mining, welding, smelting, or other occupational use, forest fires and volcanic eruptions, pollution in groundwater and air, ingesting contaminated food or water, and by taking illicit drugs cut with manganese. At very low levels, Mn is essential to healthy energy metabolism and antioxidant function. However, overexposure to Mn is neurotoxic. High levels of Mn interfere with mitochondrial respiration and cause oxidative stress and other effects. Mn overexposure leads to both motor and cognitive dysfunction, displaying similarities to symptoms of Parkinson's Disease. Similarities and differences between manganism (toxicity), manganese-related parkinsonism, and Parkinson's disease (neurodegenerative) are a matter of research and debate. Concentrations of Mn and timing of exposure (acute or chronic) may be related to different mechanisms, effects, and diagnosis. Acute exposure to high levels of Mn primarily affects the globus pallidus. Chronic lifetime exposure at low levels may affect brain areas more broadly, including the substantia nigra. A patient's occupational history is important for distinguishing cases of toxicity from neurodegenerative disease, and identifying appropriate treatment.

=== Solvents ===
Since 2019, the Movement Disorder Society (MDS) has included "occupational solvent exposure" as a risk factor in the MDS research criteria for prodromal Parkinson's disease. Solvents include trichloroethylene (TCE) and tetrachloroethylene (PCE).

Trichloroethylene (TCE) is a volatile organic compound (VOC), a carbon-based chemical that easily vaporizes. As a chemical solvent it is used primarily as a degreasing agent and to produce refrigerants. It also has been used in textile production, dry cleaning, carpet cleaning, automotive care products, spray coatings, decaffeination of coffee, and as an obstetric anaesthetic.

TCE is a naturally colorless liquid that easily vaporizes and is persistent in soil and groundwater. TCE can evaporate from soil or groundwater to enter buildings as a vapor, and can contaminate both indoor and outdoor air. TCE has been detected in up to one-third of drinking water in the United States. TCE readily crosses biological membranes. People can be exposed to TCE by swallowing contaminated food or water, breathing contaminated air, and through skin contact.

TCE has been identified as a cause or risk factor for multiple diseases. The activity of TCE has been linked to disruption of mitochondrial function, oxidative stress, and neuroinflammation, mechanisms that contribute to Parkinson's disease. TCE was one of the main chemicals involved in water contamination at Marine Corps Base Camp Lejeune in North Carolina. Over a period of decades, chemicals were improperly disposed of and contaminated the water supply. Those exposed to the TCE-contaminated water had a 70% higher risk of developing Parkinson's disease decades later, compared to veterans who trained at other locations.

On January 9, 2023, the United States Environmental Protection Agency (EPA) concluded that TCE presents an unreasonable risk of causing injury to human health. In December 2024 the EPA issued a final rule to ban the use of trichloroethylene. However, under the Trump administration, this has been delayed.

=== Other toxicants ===
Carbon disulfide is a risk factor and has been identified in industrial worker case studies and has induced parkinsonism in mice. It is mainly used in the manufacture of viscose rayon and rubber. Carbon disulfide has been mixed with carbon tetrachloride for use in the fumigation of grain.

=== Air pollution ===
As defined by the World Health Organization, air pollution is "contamination of the indoor or outdoor environment by any chemical, physical or biological agent that modifies the natural characteristics of the atmosphere." Polluted air is a mixture of gases and particulate matter whose composition varies with local conditions and sources of contaminants. Concentrations of pollutants, components of particulate matter, and duration and timing of exposure to them, vary with location and time, both regionally and seasonally. Both indoor and outdoor (ambient) air can be polluted.

Particulate matter (PM) contains both solids and liquids and is defined in terms of the size of its particles: PM_{10}, diameter <10 μm); PM_{2.5}, < 2.5 μm; or ultrafine, <0.1 μm. Particles PM_{2.5} or smaller can cross the blood-air barrier in the lungs and the blood-brain barrier in the olfactory system, routes by which they can enter the brain.

Particulate matter can be made up of multiple components, some of which are linked to specific types of sources. These include black carbon (combustion processes), ammonium (agriculture), NO_{2} (traffic‐related pollution), secondary organic aerosols (long‐range transport), and metals such as iron, manganese and lead (e.g. mineral dust). Chemicals in pesticides can be released into air or water, and some can vaporize from water into air, contributing to air pollution. Polycyclic aromatic hydrocarbons (PAHs) are released from incomplete combustion of wood, fossil fuels, and petroleum products, including by smoking and cooking.

Long-term exposure to air pollution may increase the risk of developing Parkinson's disease (PD). Components including particulate matter (PM_{2.5}) and gases such as nitrogen dioxide (NO_{2}), nitrogen oxides generally, ozone (O_{3}) and carbon monoxide (CO) are associated with increased risk for PD. Higher PM_{2.5} levels correlate with increased PD hospitalization rates, for both short-term and long-term exposure.

Air pollution is linked to Parkinson's disease through mechanisms of oxidative stress. PM_{2.5}, NO_{x}, and polycyclic aromatic hydrocarbons (PAHs) can cause the formation of reactive oxygen species (ROS). If there is an imbalance between the production of reactive oxygen species (ROS) and the body's ability to detoxify itself, this can lead to neuronal damage. Long-term exposure to air pollutants may lead to chronic oxidative stress and contribute to the progressive development of PD.

Air pollution is also linked to increased risk of Parkinson's disease through mechanisms of systemic inflammation, neuroinflammation, and neuronal loss. Components of air pollution, particularly smaller particles, can reach the brain directly and contribute to PD pathology through direct neurotoxic effects or neuroinflammation. Exposure to air pollution can also cause peripheral inflammation of the lungs and other tissues, which can lead to systemic inflammation, weakening of the blood–brain barrier (BBB), and increased neuroinflammation.

== Medical risk factors ==
=== Inflammation ===
Neuroinflammation is considered a contributing mechanism in Parkinson's disease. Research has shown lasting activation of the brain's immune cells, microglia, in regions affected by the disease, suggesting that inflammation may play a role in the gradual loss of dopamine-producing neurons. While immune responses can be protective in the short term, chronic inflammation may damage neurons over time. Dopaminergic neurons appear to be particularly vulnerable under inflammatory conditions. The normal production and breakdown of dopamine already place these cells under higher stress than other neurons. When inflammation is present, this may increase the neurons' susceptibility to damage and speed up degeneration. Changes in dopamine signaling may then influence immune activity in the brain, creating a feedback loop to further worsen neuronal loss.

=== Brain injury ===
There are similarities in what happens in the brain over time in Parkinson's disease and after a traumatic brain injury (TBI). PD is a progressive disorder, while TBI is an acute event that can be followed by both short- and long-term changes. Mechanisms common to both include changes in protein regulation, increased protein misfolding, protein aggregation, inflammation, and neurodegeneration. A history of TBI is reported as a risk factor for developing PD, but how mechanisms interact and whether TBI affects PD onset, development or progression are unclear.

=== Type 2 diabetes ===
Type 2 diabetes mellitus (T2DM) and PD may involve common disease mechanisms such as mitochondrial dysfunction, insulin resistance, and oxidative stress. T2DM has been associated with an increased risk of PD and faster disease progression, in particular motor decline.

== Lifestyle protective factors ==
Exercise and caffeine consumption are known to help decrease the risks of PD. Diet can also affect the level of risk: eating patterns rich in fruits, vegetables, whole grains, and fish, are associated with reduced risk of Parkinson's disease, while diets high in red meats and processed foods are associated with increased risk.

=== Exercise ===
While many environmental factors may exacerbate Parkinson's disease, exercise is considered to be one of the main protective factors for neurodegenerative disorders, including Parkinson's disease. The use of exercise can reduce risk or delay development of PD (primary prevention). Higher levels of moderate to vigorous physical activity are associated with a lowered risk of PD. There are also indications that exercise may slow or halt PD progression (secondary prevention). For example, increased levels of physical activity have been associated with slower deterioration on measures of daily living activities. This was found regardless of people's initial physical activity levels. Finally, exercise may help to reduce some symptoms of PD (tertiary prevention). Underlying protective mechanisms are not yet understood.

Types of exercise that have been studied include aerobic exercise, resistance exercise, and balance and gait exercises. Respectively, they improve aerobic capacity, muscle strength, and postural stability/balance. Aerobic exercise includes physical activity that increases the heart rate. Resistance training uses tools like weights, bands, or bodyweight to challenge muscles, increasing strength and function over time. Goal-based exercises are often developed with the guidance of a physical therapist to target specific outcomes such as balance and gait. Recommendations are to include multiple types of exercise in exercise programs, and to prescribe exercise as early as possible in addition to medication, to gain the benefits of regular, long-term activity.

Aerobic and resistance training exercise guidelines for Parkinson disease recommend 3–5 days per week of aerobic training (doing 20–60 minutes at moderate intensity) and 2–3 days per week of resistance training (doing 1-3 sets, of 8-12 repetitions, at between 40%-50% of the maximum for 1 repetition). Exercise is generally considered safe, with studies in PD reporting no serious adverse events and a very low risk of other events such as soreness, joint inflammation, fatigue, dizziness, or falls. Drop-out rates were comparable for exercising and non-exercising controls, with a generally high rate of exercise adherence.

=== Coffee consumption ===
Epidemiological studies show that coffee consumption is associated with decreased mortality and lower rates of some neurological diseases, including Parkinson's disease and type 2 diabetes. Coffee beans and roasted coffee can contain hundreds of individual compounds, including caffeine, chlorogenic acid (CGA), quercetin, trigonelline, caffeic acid, and phenylindane. Underlying mechanisms are not yet understood.

=== Diet ===
Emerging research suggests that diet may influence the risk of developing Parkinson's. A 2023 study found that adherence to a Western dietary pattern—characterized by high consumption of red and processed meats, fried foods, high-fat dairy products, and refined grains—is associated with an increased risk of Parkinson's. Individuals with the highest adherence to this dietary pattern had significantly higher odds—approximately seven times—of developing the disease. Conversely, diets rich in fruits, vegetables, whole grains, and lean proteins have been associated with a reduced risk of Parkinson's. Biological mechanisms related to possible cognitive protective effects are currently unknown.
