= Ling Qi =

Chinese-American scientist and department chair

Ling Qi (齐岭) is a Chinese-American biomedical scientist and academic specializing in endoplasmic-reticulum-associated protein degradation (ERAD) and its role in cellular homeostasis and disease. He is currently Chair of the Department of Molecular Physiology and Biological Physics at the University of Virginia School of Medicine, where he holds the Andrew P. Somlyo Distinguished Professorship in Molecular Physiology.

Qi's research focuses on the intersection of protein quality control, metabolism, and disease, including diabetes, obesity, and neurodevelopmental disorders.

== Early life and education ==
Qi received his B.S. in Microbiology from Fudan University in Shanghai. He earned a Ph.D. in Immunology from the University of Maryland, Baltimore County in 2001, conducting research under immunologist Suzanne Ostrand-Rosenberg. He completed postdoctoral training in telomere biology and cancer with Carol Greider at Johns Hopkins University (2001–2004), followed by work on transcriptional regulation in metabolism with Marc Montminy, a member of the National Academy of Sciences.

== Career and research ==
Qi launched his independent research program in 2007 at Cornell University's Division of Nutritional Sciences, where he was promoted to tenured Associate Professor in 2013. He moved to the University of Michigan Medical School in 2016 and was recruited in 2023 to the University of Virginia School of Medicine.

His work has focused on the ERAD pathway, particularly the SEL1L-HRD1 complex. His group demonstrated its essential role in maintaining endoplasmic reticulum (ER) function and organismal homeostasis. His lab later showed that ERAD regulates mitochondrial dynamics in brown adipocytes using 3D imaging techniques.

In 2023, Qi's lab delineated the role of SEL1L-HRD1 ERAD in innate immunity by regulating STING signaling. The findings were highlighted in expert perspectives.

His group has also identified genetic variants of SEL1L-HRD1 ERAD in human patients with neurodevelopmental disorders. In the same year, his team published the structural resolution of the SEL1L-HRD1 core complex in mammalian cells.

As of 2025, Qi has authored over 100 peer-reviewed publications and 10 invited reviews. His work has been continuously funded by the National Institutes of Health and other organizations since 2007, with total support exceeding $25 million, including a recent grant from the National Institute on Aging.

According to Google Scholar, his h-index is 55.

== Recognition and service ==
Qi was elected a Fellow of the American Association for the Advancement of Science (AAAS) in 2021 for "distinguished contributions to the fields of immunometabolism and cellular stress pathways." He has received awards from the American Diabetes Association, American Federation for Aging Research, and American Society for Nutrition.

He has served as Chair of NIH study sections and as President of the Chinese American Diabetes Association. At the University of Michigan, he chaired the Biomedical Research Council.

== Mentorship and teaching ==
Qi has mentored over 100 trainees, including undergraduate and graduate students as well as postdoctoral fellows. He received the SUNY Chancellor's Award for Excellence in Teaching in 2014 and twice served as faculty speaker at Cornell's Nutritional Sciences graduation ceremonies.
