= Proteasome adapter and scaffold protein ECM29 =

Protein-coding gene in the species Homo sapiens

ECPAS

Identifiers
- Aliases: ECPAS, ECM29, Ecm29 proteasome adaptor and scaffold, KIAA0368
- External IDs: OMIM: 616694; MGI: 2140220; GeneCards: ECPAS

Gene location (Human)
Chr.	Chromosome 9 (human)
Band	9q31.3	Start	111,360,685 bp
Band	9q31.3	End	111,484,745 bp

Gene location (Mouse)
Chr.	Chromosome 4 (mouse)
Band	4|4 B3	Start	58,798,911 bp
Band	4|4 B3	End	58,912,749 bp
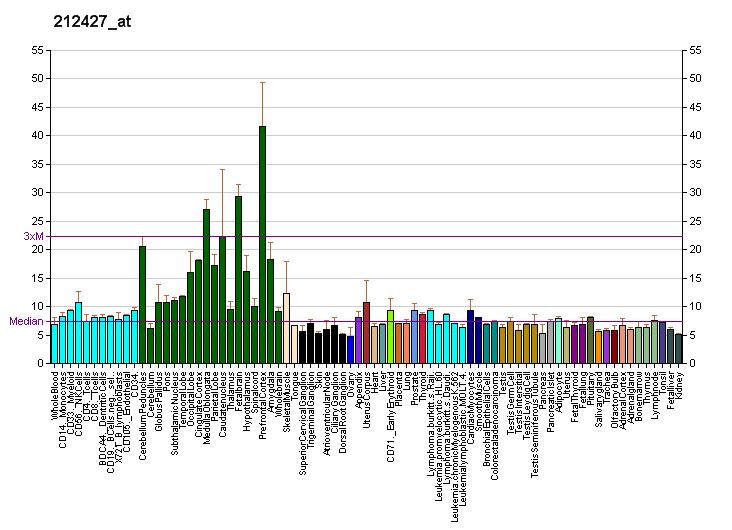

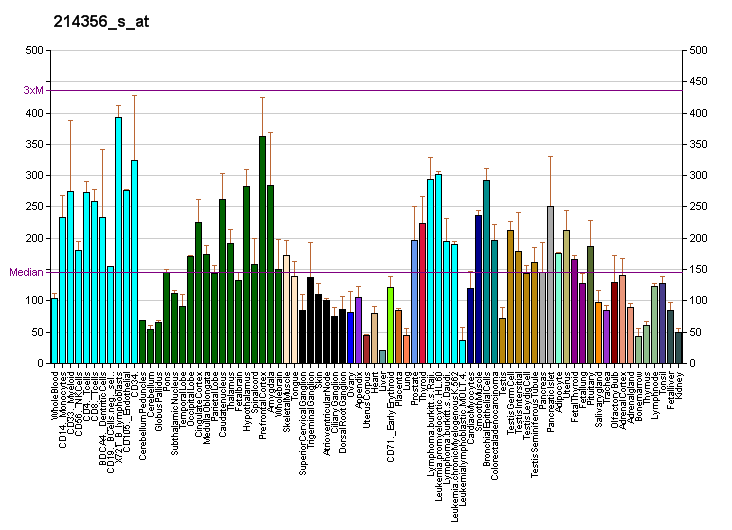

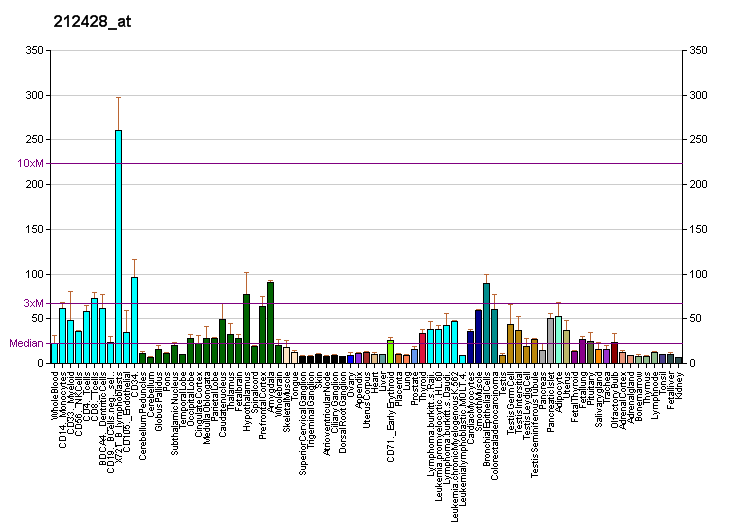
RNA expression pattern
Bgee	Human / Mouse (ortholog); Top expressed in: gastrocnemius muscle; tendon of biceps brachii; buccal mucosa cell; muscle of thigh; glutes; Skeletal muscle tissue of rectus abdominis; Skeletal muscle tissue of biceps brachii; deltoid muscle; internal globus pallidus; endothelial cell / Top expressed in: muscle of thigh; plantaris muscle; aortic valve; extensor digitorum longus muscle; secondary oocyte; zygote; cardiac muscle tissue of left ventricle; primary oocyte; ascending aorta; quadriceps femoris muscle; More reference expression data
BioGPS	More reference expression data
Gene ontology
Molecular function	protein binding; molecular adaptor activity; proteasome binding
Cellular component	cytoplasm; multivesicular body; endosome; late endosome; centrosome; membrane; endocytic vesicle; microtubule organizing center; trans-Golgi network; early endosome; endoplasmic reticulum; proteasome complex; COPII-coated ER to Golgi transport vesicle; cytoskeleton; nucleus; endoplasmic reticulum-Golgi intermediate compartment; cytoplasmic vesicle
Biological process	ubiquitin-dependent ERAD pathway; proteasome assembly
Sources:Amigo / QuickGO
Orthologs
Databases	NCBI: entry; OMA: entry
Species	Human	Mouse
Entrez	23392	230249
Ensembl	ENSG00000136813	ENSMUSG00000050812
UniProt	Q5VYK3	Q6PDI5
RefSeq (mRNA)	NM_001080398; NM_001363756; NM_001364929; NM_001364930; NM_001364931	NM_172381; NM_001355696; NM_001355697
RefSeq (protein)	NP_001073867; NP_001350685; NP_001351858; NP_001351859; NP_001351860	NP_759013; NP_001342625; NP_001342626
Location (UCSC)	Chr 9: 111.36 – 111.48 Mb	Chr 4: 58.8 – 58.91 Mb
PubMed search
- Wikidata
View/Edit Human	View/Edit Mouse

Proteasome adapter and scaffold protein ECM29 is a protein that in humans is encoded by the ECPAS gene. The protein ECM29 is a scaffold protein that binds to different proteins depending on the location within the cell, such as motor proteins or the 26S proteasome. It may be involve in endoplasmic-reticulum-associated protein degradation.
