= Denali (disambiguation) =

Denali (federally designated as Mount McKinley) is a mountain in Alaska, and the highest in North America.

Denali may also refer to:

== Places ==
- Denali National Park and Preserve, within which the mountain is located
- Denali Borough, Alaska, in which the mountain and most of the park are located
- Denali Fault, intracontinental strike-slip fault
- Denali Highway, Alaska State Highway 8
- Denali State Park, a state park near the national park
- Denali, Alaska, a former mining settlement near Valdez Creek approximately 50 miles east of Cantwell.

== Art, entertainment, and media ==
- Denali (band), an American band
  - Denali (album), self-titled album by the band
- Denali, the great Mastodon from the 1980s television series Gumby
- Denali (drag queen), a drag performer who appeared on season 13 of RuPaul's Drag Race
- Molly of Denali, an animated children's television show

== Computing ==
- Denali (operating system), computer software from University of Washington
- Denali Software, a semiconductor design and software company
- Denali, the internal codename for version 11.0 of Microsoft SQL Server

== Transportation ==
- Denali (Alaska Railroad station), a station on the Denali Star rail line
- Denali - The Alaska Gas Pipeline, a proposed natural gas pipeline by BP and ConocoPhillips
- GMC Denali, the nameplate for some luxury versions of GMC trucks and SUVs
- ZB 304, or floating dock Denali, a barge in use at Dutch Harbor, Alaska
- Denali Scout, a two-seat STOL aeroplane by American Champion Aircraft
- Beechcraft Denali, a light aeroplane by Textron subsidiary Beechcraft

== Other uses ==
- Denali Award (disambiguation), any of several awards
- Denali fleabane, a flower

== See also ==
- Kali Denali Music, a music label and production company founded by rapper Bohemia
