= CHCH (disambiguation) =

CHCH refers to the Canadian television station CHCH-DT.

CHCH may also refer to:

- CHCH Television Tower, television tower in Canada
- CHCHD2, protein that in humans is encoded by the CHCHD2 gene
- CHCHD10, protein that in humans is encoded by the CHCHD10 gene

== See also ==
- ChCh, an abbreviation for Christchurch, New Zealand
