= Denali Award =

Denali Award may refer to:

- Denali Award, the top honor that the Alaska Federation of Natives bestows to non-Natives
- Denali Award, the highest award in Varsity Scouting
- Denali Award, one form of the Alaskan of the Year awards
