= William Tobin (journalist) =

American journalist (1927–2009)

William Joseph Tobin (July 28, 1927 – April 5, 2009) was an American newspaper journalist, reporter and editor. Tobin was the first correspondent for The Associated Press to be based in Juneau, Alaska.

== Biography ==
=== Early life ===
Tobin was born in Joplin, Missouri, on July 28, 1927. He received his bachelor's degree in journalism from Butler University in 1948.

=== Career ===
Tobin's career briefly began at the Indianapolis Star before he joined The Associated Press in 1948. His early work at the Associated Press included transfers from Indianapolis to AP bureaus in New York City and Louisville, Kentucky.

Tobin was transferred to Juneau, Alaska, in 1958, when he was 28 years old. In doing so, Tobin became the first Associated Press correspondent to be based in Juneau, the capital city of Alaska. In a statement released at the time of Tobin's posting in Juneau, Frank J. Starzel, the Associated Press' then general manager, stated, "This forward step reflects The Associated Press' recognition of the increased importance and growth of the territory."

Tobin covered Alaska's transition from territory to state in 1959, which he later wrote was, "was a thrilling job for me." He covered the visit of Vice President Richard Nixon's 1958 visit to Alaska. He also accompanied then Senator John F. Kennedy's 1960 campaign stops through Alaska, during the first U.S. presidential election in which Alaskans could fully participate.

Tobin was promoted to the Associated Press' assistant bureau chief in Baltimore, Maryland, in 1960. He was transferred again one year later, this time becoming the bureau chief in Helena, Montana, in 1961.

By the early 1960s, Tobin, who was married with three sons at the time, was looking for a more permanent job and residence, where he could raise his family. Tobin called the owner of the Anchorage Times, Robert "Bob" Atwood in 1963 to inquire about any job prospects in Alaska. Atwood gave Tobin the position of managing editor at the newspaper. Tobin would later be promoted editor-in-chief and assistant publisher. Tobin remained with the Anchorage Times until the newspaper ceased publication in 1992.

Following the closure of the Anchorage Times, the owner of the Times began paying for a "daily conservative, half-page op-ed" piece in the rival Anchorage Daily News. The new op-ed space in the Anchorage Daily News was called the Voice of the Times. Tobin was the senior editor of the Voice of the Times from 1992 until the op-ed piece was discontinued in October 2008.

During his long career as an Alaskan journalist, Tobin covered the 1964 Alaska earthquake and its aftermath, the construction of the trans-Alaska pipeline and the discovery of oil in the Alaska North Slope. He also was on the boards of directors of c. 40 civic organizations at various times during his career.

=== Death ===
Bill Tobin was diagnosed with esophageal cancer in October 2008, the same month that the Voice of the Times ceased to be published in the Anchorage Daily News. Tobin died from the disease on April 5, 2009, at his home in Anchorage at the age of 81.

Tobin's funeral was held at the Cathedral of the Holy Family in Anchorage. He was survived by his wife of nearly 57 years, Marjorie, their three sons, Mike, Dave and Jim; and six grandchildren.
