= Pathophysiology of Parkinson's disease =

Neuronal Death in the PD brain
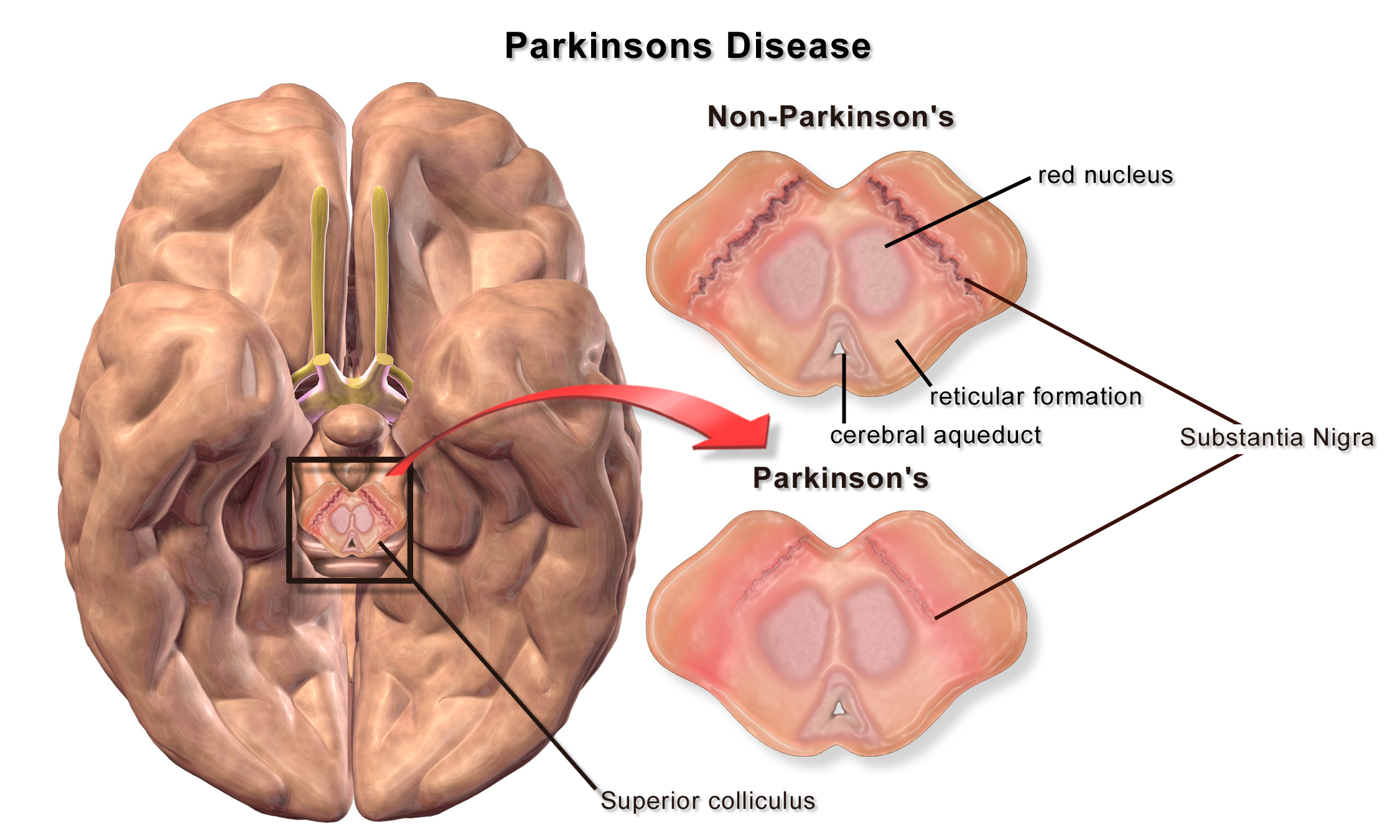
- A brain without and with Parkinson's Disease compared in Substantia Nigra

The pathophysiology of Parkinson's disease involves the gradual degeneration of dopamine producing neurons in a brain region called the substantia nigra and other related cell groups in the brainstem. This is accompanied by the accumulation of misfolded proteins such as alpha-synuclein. Alpha-synuclein is normally found in the presynaptic terminals of neurons. If alpha-synuclein is mis-folded and not cleared from cells by cellular degradation systems, it can build up to form clumps of proteins called Lewy bodies and Lewy neurites. Accumulation stimulates the release of pro-inflammatory molecules by the microglia, a protective response that can cause inflammation and neuronal damage if it becomes chronic. Neuroinflammation causes the blood-brain barrier (BBB) to become more permeable, allowing dangerous substances and inflammatory cells to enter the brain and interfere with metabolic functions. Dysfunction in mitochondria, which are central to cellular energy production, increases oxidative stress and cell death.

PD has no single cause: rather, genetic and environmental factors interact and affect a complex interplay of critical cellular processes. The cumulative effects of many different environmental exposures over a lifetime interact with underlying genetic factors to influence PD development and progression. Protein aggregation, inflammation and metabolic dysregulation in lysosomal, endosomal, and mitochondrial systems are interconnected mechanisms which create a self-perpetuating cycle of inflammation, cellular stress and damage in Parkinson's disease.

== Protein aggregation ==
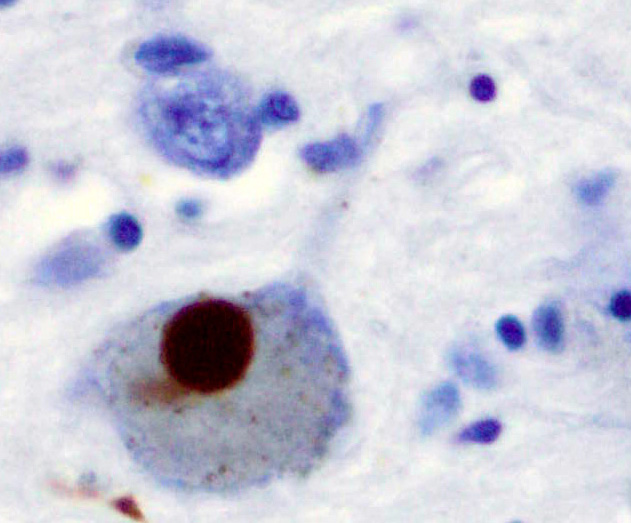
A brain tissue with Lewy bodies

The first major proposed cause of neuronal death in Parkinson's disease involves the bundling (oligomerization) and mis-folding of proteins. The protein alpha-synuclein, which is encoded by the SNCA gene, has increased presence in the brains of Parkinson's Disease patients where it aggregates to form Lewy bodies (shown to left) in neurons. Lewy bodies are recognized as a pathological marker of Parkinson's disease.

Alpha-synuclein appears to be a key link between reduced DNA repair and Parkinson's disease. Alpha-synuclein activates ATM (ataxia-telangiectasia mutated), a major DNA damage repair signaling kinase. Alpha-synuclein binds to breaks in double-stranded DNA and facilitates the DNA repair process of non-homologous end joining. Reduced expression of α-Syn may lead to increased formation of DNA double-strand breaks (DSBs) and reduced ability to repair DSBs. Cytoplasmic aggregation of alpha-synuclein to form Lewy bodies may reduce alpha-synuclein availability in the nucleus leading to decreased DNA repair, increased DNA double-strand breaks and increased programmed cell death of neurons.

The activity of alpha-synuclein is not limited to a single area of the brain. The neuropathology of Lewy bodies is known to progress and spread. Both body-first and brain-first models of Lewy body disorders have been proposed. In the body-first model, damage to alpha-synuclein originates in the enteric nervous system, in the lining of the gastrointestinal tract, and then spreads to the brain. In the brain-first model, pathogenic alpha-synuclein first appears inside the central nervous system, possibly via the olfactory bulb and amygdala, from which it spreads to the lower brainstem and the autonomic division of the peripheral nervous system. It has been suggested that body-first and brain-first models may describe different clinical subtypes of PD.

Body-first and brain-first models potentially explain the connection of PD mechanisms with known environmental risk factors such as exposure to pesticides, industrial chemicals, and air pollution. Most toxicants are inhaled, ingested, or both. In the nasal cavity and gut, they engage directly with mucosal surfaces where inflammation can occur. Pathways from the olfactory system and gut to the brain are well established.

== Autophagy disruption ==
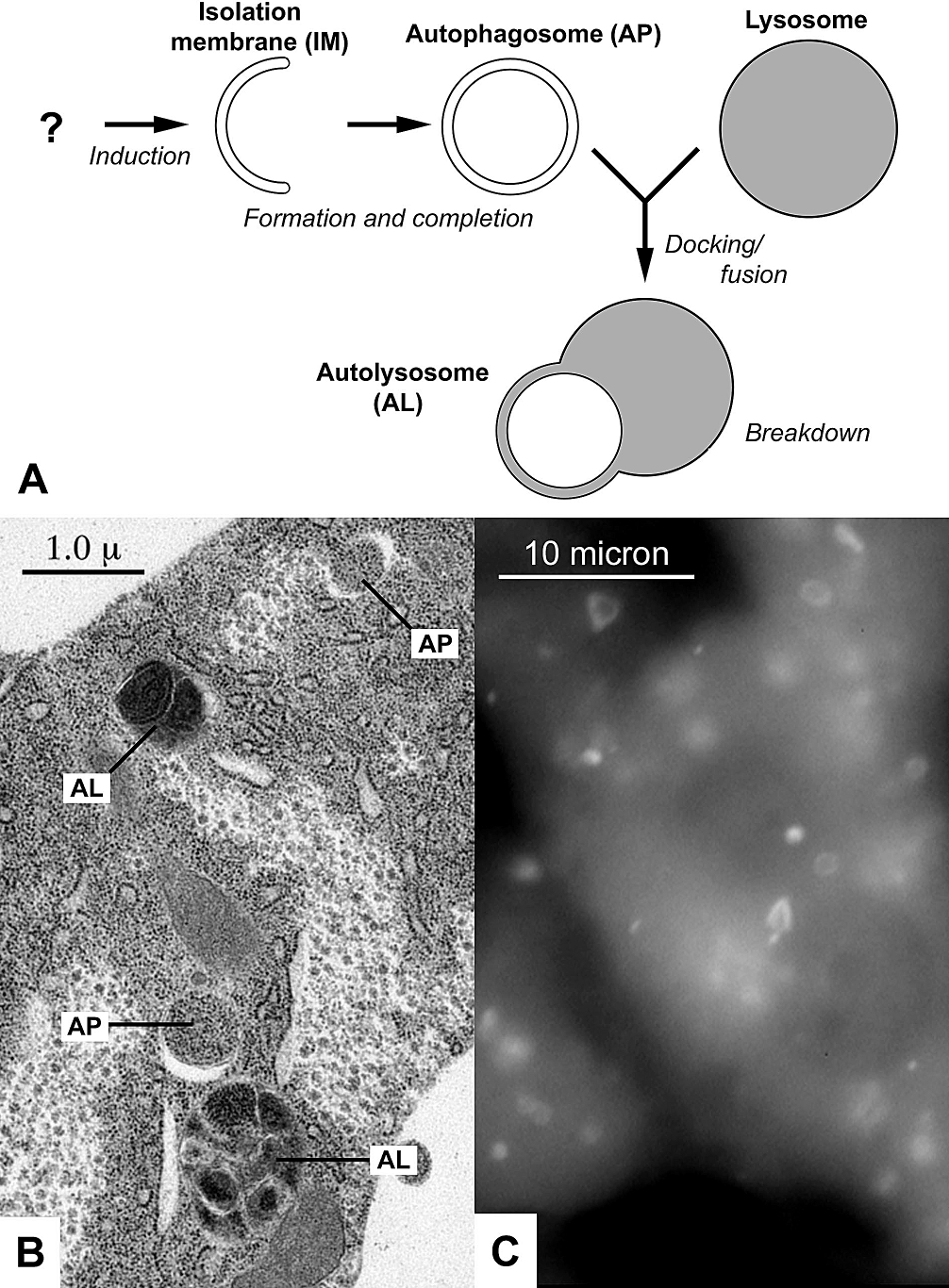
An image illustrating autophagy

The second major proposed mechanism for neuronal death in Parkinson's disease, autophagy, is a mechanism by which inner components of the cell are broken down and recycled for use. Autophagy has been shown to play a role in brain health, helping to regulate cellular function. Disruption of the autophagy mechanism can lead to several different types of diseases including Parkinson's disease. Autophagy dysfunction in Parkinson's disease also has been linked to dysregulated mitochondria degradation (mitophagy).

== Mitochondrial dysfunction ==
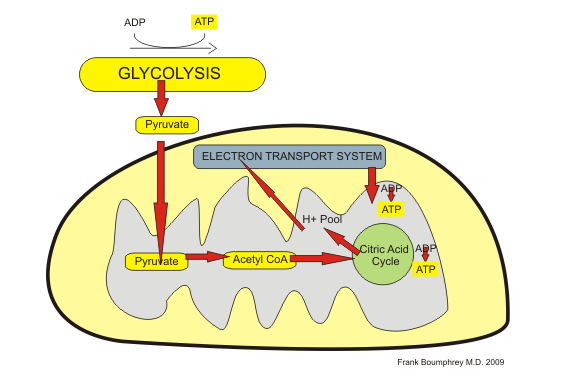
A simplified illustration of energy production in a mitochondrion

The third major proposed cause of cell death in Parkinson's disease involves the energy-generating mitochondrion organelle. In Parkinson's disease, mitochondrial function is disrupted, inhibiting energy production and resulting in death.

One mechanism behind mitochondrial dysfunction in Parkinson's disease involves the PINK1 and Parkin pathway, which tags damaged mitochondria for removal (mitophagy). PINK1 accumulates on the outer surface of impaired mitochondria. Ubiquitin is phosphorylated by PINK1 to activate Parkin, which tags mitochondrial proteins for degradation. In Parkinson's disease, mutations of the genes coding PINK1 and Parkin impair normal mitochondrial function, leading to defective clearance of damaged mitochondria. Mitochondrial DNA (mtDNA) mutations have been shown to accumulate with age indicating that susceptibility to this mechanism of neuronal death increases with age.

Another mitochondrial-related mechanism for cell death in Parkinson's disease is the increased generation of Reactive oxygen species (ROS). Mitochondrial dysfunction in PD patients reduces adenosine triphosphate (ATP) synthesis and increases generation of ROS, damaging mitochondrial membranes and releasing factors involved in apoptosis. With increasing age, mitochondria lose their ability to remove ROS yet still maintain their production of ROS, causing an increase in net production of ROS and eventually cell death.

Mitochondrial dysfunction disrupts cellular energy production and increases oxidative stress. Oxidative stress causes oxidative DNA damage. Oxidative stress appears to have a role in mediating multiple separate pathological events in pathways that ultimately result in cell death in PD. Alpha-synuclein and dopamine levels are involved in amplifying oxidative stress.

Mitochondrial dysfunction also triggers inflammation by activating damage-associated molecular patterns (DAMPs), inflammatory cells, and intracellular protein complexes inside inflammatory cells called inflammasomes.

== Neuroinflammation ==
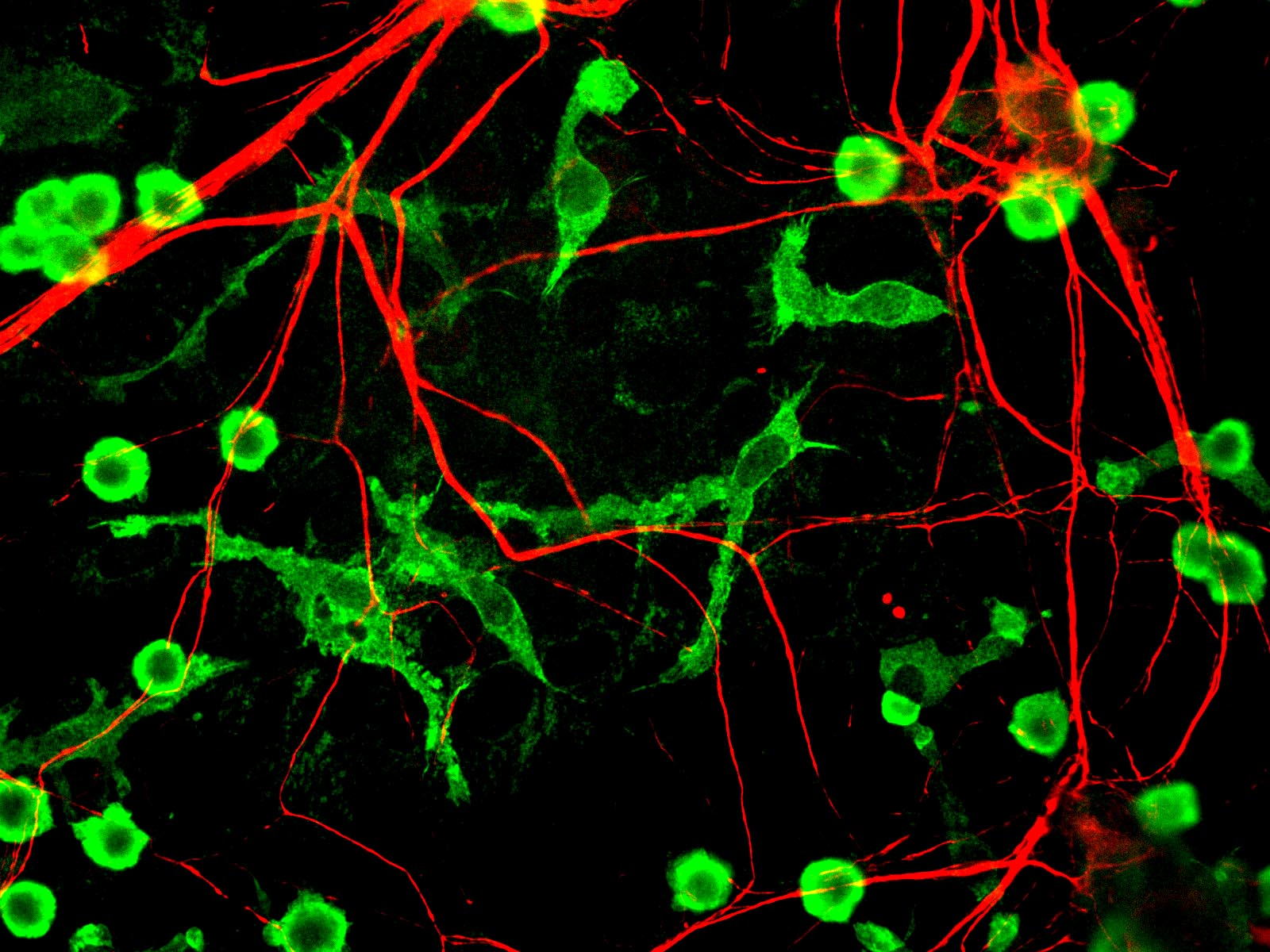
Microglia (green) interacting with neurons (red)

Neuroinflammation is considered a contributing mechanism in Parkinson's disease as well as other neurodegenerative diseases. One major cell type involved in neuroinflammation is the microglia, which are the innate immune cells of the central nervous system. Research has shown lasting activation of the brain's microglia in regions affected by the disease, suggesting that inflammation may play a role in the gradual loss of dopamine-producing neurons. While immune responses can be protective in the short term, chronic inflammation may damage neurons over time. Dopaminergic neurons appear to be particularly vulnerable under inflammatory conditions. The normal production and breakdown of dopamine already place these cells under higher stress than other neurons. When inflammation is present, this may increase the neurons' susceptibility to damage and speed up degeneration. Changes in dopamine signaling may then influence immune activity in the brain, creating a feedback loop to further worsen neuronal loss. Microglia generate reactive oxygen species (ROS) and release signals to recruit peripheral immune cells for an inflammatory response.

== Blood–brain barrier breakdown ==
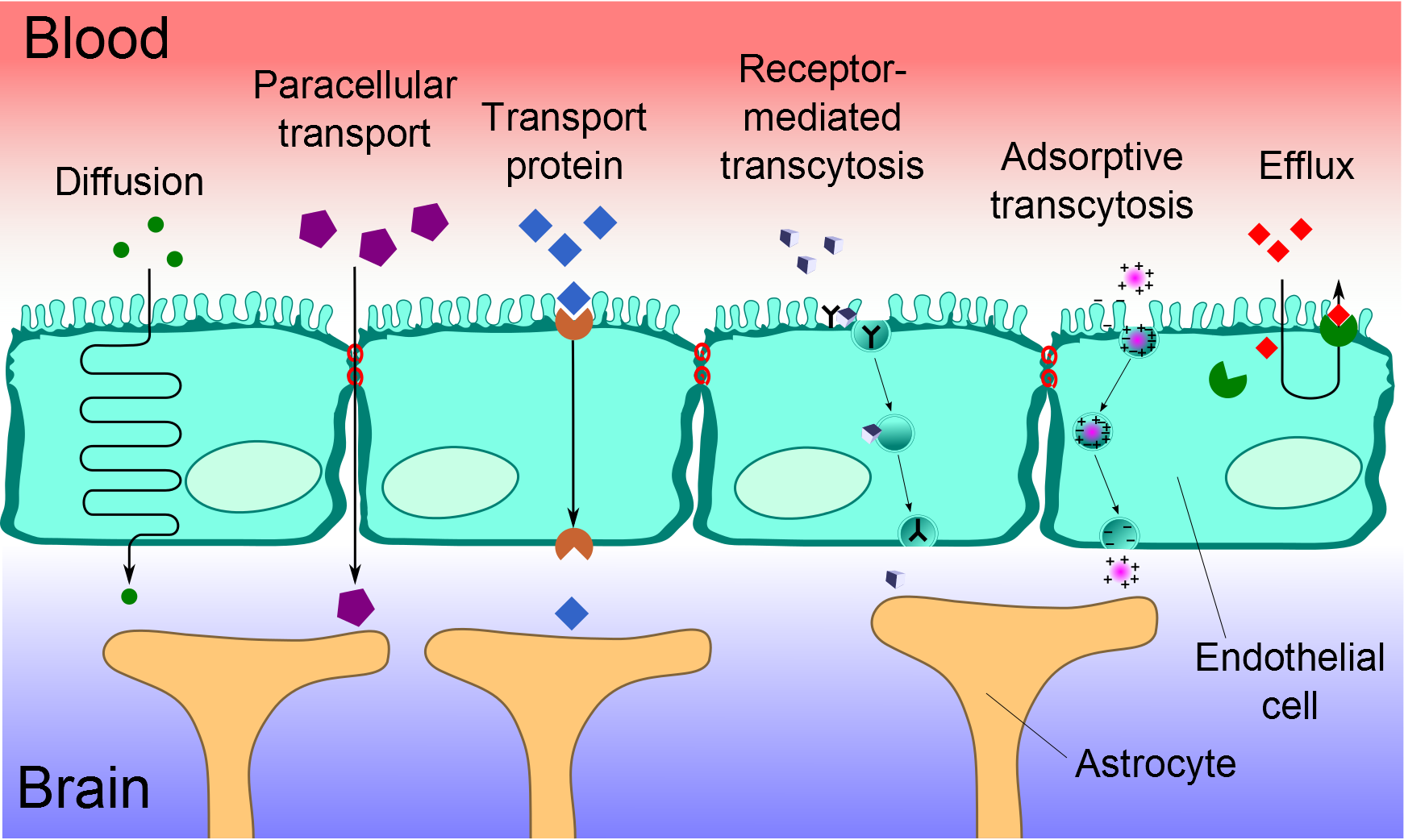
An image depicting blood–brain barrier shape and function

The fifth proposed major mechanism for cell death is the breakdown of the blood–brain barrier (BBB). The BBB has three cell types which tightly regulate the flow of molecules in and out of the brain: endothelial cells, pericytes, and astrocytes. In neurodegenerative diseases, BBB breakdown has been measured and identified in specific regions of the brain, including the substantia nigra in Parkinson's disease and hippocampus in Alzheimer's disease. Neuroinflammation causes the BBB to become more permeable, allowing dangerous substances and inflammatory cells to enter the brain and interfere with metabolic functions.

Vascular endothelial growth factor (VEGF) and VEGF receptors and dopamine signaling are considered critical to vascular and neural health. Interaction between the VEGF protein and its receptors regulates the proliferation, migration, and survival of endothelial cells. Disruption can interfere with cell growth and prevent new capillary formation via angiogenesis. Cell receptor disruption can also affect the ability for cells to adhere to one another with adherens junctions. Without new capillary formation, the existing capillaries break down and cells start to dissociate from each other. This in turn leads to the breakdown of gap-junctions. Gap junctions in endothelial cells in the BBB help prevent large or harmful molecules from entering the brain by regulating the flow of nutrients to the brain. However, as gap junctions break down, plasma proteins are able to pass through into the brain. This mechanism is also known as vascular leakiness, where capillary degeneration leads to blood and blood proteins "leaking" into the brain. Vascular leakiness can eventually cause neurons to alter their function and shift towards apoptotic behavior or cell death.

== Impact on locomotion ==
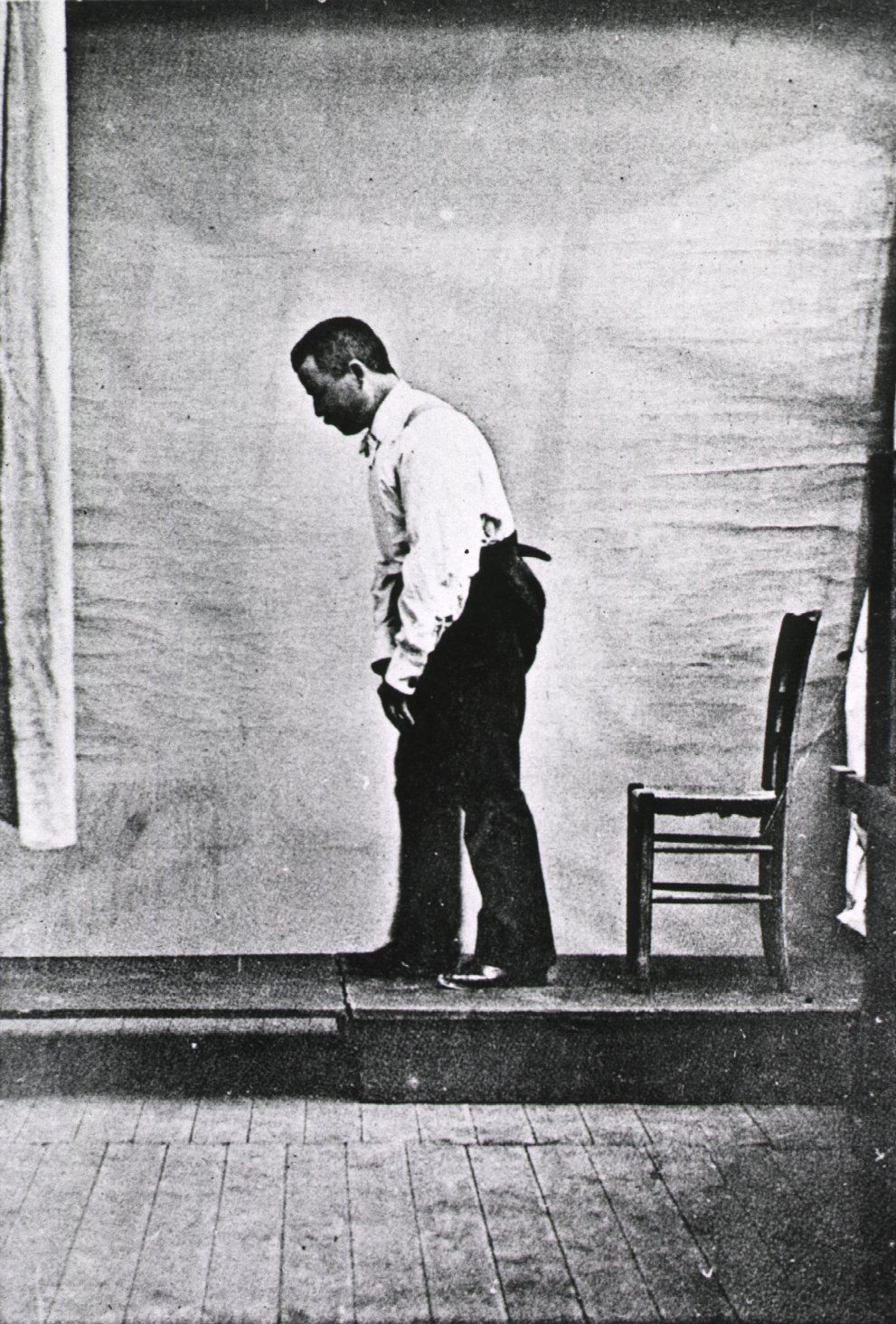
An image depicting Parkinsonian gait

Coordinated movement is a complex spatiotemporal activity. The motor cortex, basal ganglia (including the substantia nigra), thalamus, and cerebellum interact to promote precise voluntary movement.

Dopamine is a neurotransmitter which modulates the activity of motor neurons in the central nervous system. The regulation of dopamine release is critical for locomotor activity. Dopamine is involved in the activity of both direct and indirect pathways in the circuits of the basal ganglia, activating the direct pathway (via D1 receptors) while inhibiting the indirect pathway (via D2 receptors). The two pathways work synergistically to initiate and control movement.

Parkinson's disease involves abnormalities in the function of the basal ganglia, including degeneration of dopamine-producing neurons in the substantia nigra and significantly reduced dopamine levels in the basal ganglia. This interferes with motor planning, execution, and adaptability, causing impairments in gait parameters such as walking speed, stride length, cadence, and variability.

== See also ==
- Causes of Parkinson's disease
