= Evangeline Atwood =

American activist, and philanthropist(1906–1987)

- Born: Maud Evangeline Rasmuson; 1906; Sitka, Alaska, United States
- Died: November 1987
- Occupation: Historian
- Known for: Author of numerous works on contemporary Alaska history, namesake of the concert hall at the Alaska Center for the Performing Arts
- Spouse: Robert Bruce Atwood (m. 1932)
- Relatives: Elmer E. Rasmuson (brother)

Evangeline Atwood (1906–1987) was an American historian, activist, and philanthropist. She was the co-founder of numerous organizations in Alaska, including the Alaska Statehood Association, the Anchorage League of Voters, the Alaska World Affairs Council, Parent-Teacher Council of Anchorage, and the Cook Inlet Historical Society. She was awarded Historian of the Year by the Alaska Historical Society in 1975. In 2009, she was named to the Alaska Women's Hall of Fame. Her husband was Robert Atwood and was the co-owner, alongside him, of the Anchorage Times.

== Early life and work ==
Maud "Evangeline" Rasmuson was born in 1906 in Sitka, Alaska. Her parents were Edward Anton Rasmuson and Jenny Olsen. She had one brother, Elmer. She attended the University of Washington and the University of Chicago, where she received her Bachelor of Arts and Master of Arts, respectively. After graduation, she worked as a social worker in Springfield, Illinois.

She married Robert Atwood on April 2, 1932, whom she met while working in Springfield. They moved to Anchorage, Alaska, in 1935. She became a historian focusing on Alaskan history. She would write six books about the history of Alaska and its culture, including one about James Wickersham. She also wrote for the Anchorage Times, in which she had two columns, "Alaska Women in Politics" and "Historically Speaking." She founded the Alaska World Affairs Council. She would serve as a board member and event planner for the organization. In 1935, she gave birth to Marilyn Jeanette Atwood. In 1940, she had another daughter, Sara "Elaine" Atwood. In 1947, she and Robert bought the Anchorage Hotel.

In the mid-1940s, she founded the Alaska Statehood Association, to support Ernest Gruening to gain statehood for Alaska. She became president of the organization, which had representation in ten cities in the state. The organization funded George Sundborg to produce a research study that would be used to explain to voters why they should make Alaska a state. It was used in the Alaska statehood elections of 1946, and the referendum was approved.

Atwood started the Anchorage League of Voters in 1950. Atwood stored the majority of her documents and papers at home, including documents related to her work at the Anchorage Times. The majority of her papers and the family archives were destroyed during the 1964 Alaska earthquake.

== Later life and legacy ==
She was named Alaskan of the Year in 1981. Atwood died in November 1987.

A manuscript about the history of Alaska's newspapers was started by Atwood, and completed by journalist Lew M. Williams, Jr., upon her death. In 2009, Atwood was inaugurated into the Alaska Women's Hall of Fame. The Anchorage Museum named the Bob and Evangeline Atwood Alaska Resource Center after her and her husband. The Atwood family papers are held in the collection of the University of Alaska Anchorage. The Atwood Concert Hall at the Alaska Center for the Performing Arts is named after Atwood. The Alaska Historical Society awards the Evangeline Atwood Award for excellence in Alaska history.
