= ZB 304 =

History
- Name: ZB 304
- Owner: Zidell Barges, a subsidiary of Zidell Marine
- Operator: ABS Ocean
- Builder: Bergeron Industries
- Yard number: 1504
- Launched: 1982
- Out of service: 1997
- Fate: Ran aground
- Status: Used as floating dock Denali at Dutch Harbor, Alaska

General characteristics
- Class & type: Freight barge
- Tonnage: 4238 GT
- Length: 300 ft (91 m)
- Beam: 90 ft (27 m)
- Height: 18.5 ft (5.6 m)

The 300-foot × 90-foot × 18.5-foot US-flagged, ABS Ocean deck barge ZB 304 was "heavy-built" in 1982 for Zidell Barges by Bergeron Industries with a spoon bow and stern rake integrating three longitudinal and seven transverse bulkheads and using 1/2-inch sides and bottom plate and 5/8-inch deck plate.

ZB 304 was lost under tow in 1997 as a result of a parted towline and grounded during heavy weather near Alsek River in the Gulf of Alaska 38 miles east of Yakutat, Alaska. A salvage crew was dispatched by air to the casualty to evaluate the situation and prepare the barge for refloating. M/V Salvage Chief, operated by Fred Divine Diving and Salvage Company, responded from Astoria, Oregon with specialized salvage gear which was transferred by helicopter and connected to fittings previously installed on ZB 304. Three six-ton salvage anchors were deployed and three tow lines were connected to ZB 304, which was refloated and towed to Yakutat. The cargo was transferred to a second barge and delivered to its destination by Dunlap Towing Company. The barge was declared a total loss but over $3 million worth of cargo and equipment was saved through the efforts of Fred Divine Diving and Salvage Company.

== Floating Dock Denali ==
ZB 304 was towed back to Puget Sound where the American Construction Company of Everett, Washington refitted the barge and sold it in 2005 to Magone Marine Services of Dutch Harbor, Alaska where it serves as floating dock Denali. Marcon International Incorporated of Coupeville, Washington was the broker in the sale.
