= GIGYF2 =

Protein-coding gene in the species Homo sapiens

Identifiers
- Aliases: GIGYF2, GYF2, PARK11, PERQ2, PERQ3, TNRC15, GRB10 interacting GYF protein 2
- External IDs: OMIM: 612003; MGI: 2138584; GeneCards: GIGYF2

Gene location (Human)
Chr.	Chromosome 2 (human)
Band	2q37.1	Start	232,697,299 bp
Band	2q37.1	End	232,860,605 bp

Gene location (Mouse)
Chr.	Chromosome 1 (mouse)
Band	1|1 C5- D	Start	87,254,720 bp
Band	1|1 C5- D	End	87,378,518 bp
RNA expression pattern
Bgee	Human / Mouse (ortholog); Top expressed in: Achilles tendon; sural nerve; epithelium of colon; testicle; right testis; left testis; corpus callosum; islet of Langerhans; bone marrow cell; ventricular zone / Top expressed in: zygote; tail of embryo; genital tubercle; neural layer of retina; yolk sac; ventricular zone; dentate gyrus of hippocampal formation granule cell; granulocyte; primary visual cortex; spermatocyte; More reference expression data
BioGPS	n/a
Gene ontology
Molecular function	protein binding; proline-rich region binding; RNA binding; cadherin binding
Cellular component	membrane; cytoplasm; endosome; endoplasmic reticulum; Golgi apparatus; cytosol; cytoplasmic stress granule; integral component of membrane; vesicle; perikaryon; proximal dendrite; protein-containing complex
Biological process	adult locomotory behavior; homeostasis of number of cells within a tissue; negative regulation of translation; spinal cord motor neuron differentiation; post-embryonic development; mitotic G1 DNA damage checkpoint signaling; feeding behavior; musculoskeletal movement; multicellular organism growth; neuromuscular process controlling balance; posttranscriptional gene silencing; insulin-like growth factor receptor signaling pathway; mRNA destabilization
Sources:Amigo / QuickGO
Orthologs
Databases	NCBI: entry; OMA: entry
Species	Human	Mouse
Entrez	26058	227331
Ensembl	ENSG00000204120	ENSMUSG00000048000
UniProt	Q6Y7W6	Q6Y7W8
RefSeq (mRNA)	NM_001103146; NM_001103147; NM_001103148; NM_015575	NM_001110212; NM_146112
RefSeq (protein)	NP_001096616; NP_001096617; NP_001096618; NP_056390	NP_001103682; NP_666224
Location (UCSC)	Chr 2: 232.7 – 232.86 Mb	Chr 1: 87.25 – 87.38 Mb
PubMed search
- Wikidata
View/Edit Human	View/Edit Mouse

GRB10-interacting GYF protein 2 is a protein that in humans is encoded by the GIGYF2 gene (previously TNRC15). The GIGYF2 protein is a core part of the 4EHP-GYF2 complex, a complex made out of multiple proteins which inhibits the initiation of RNA to protein translation.
