= LRRK2 =

Protein kinase found in humans

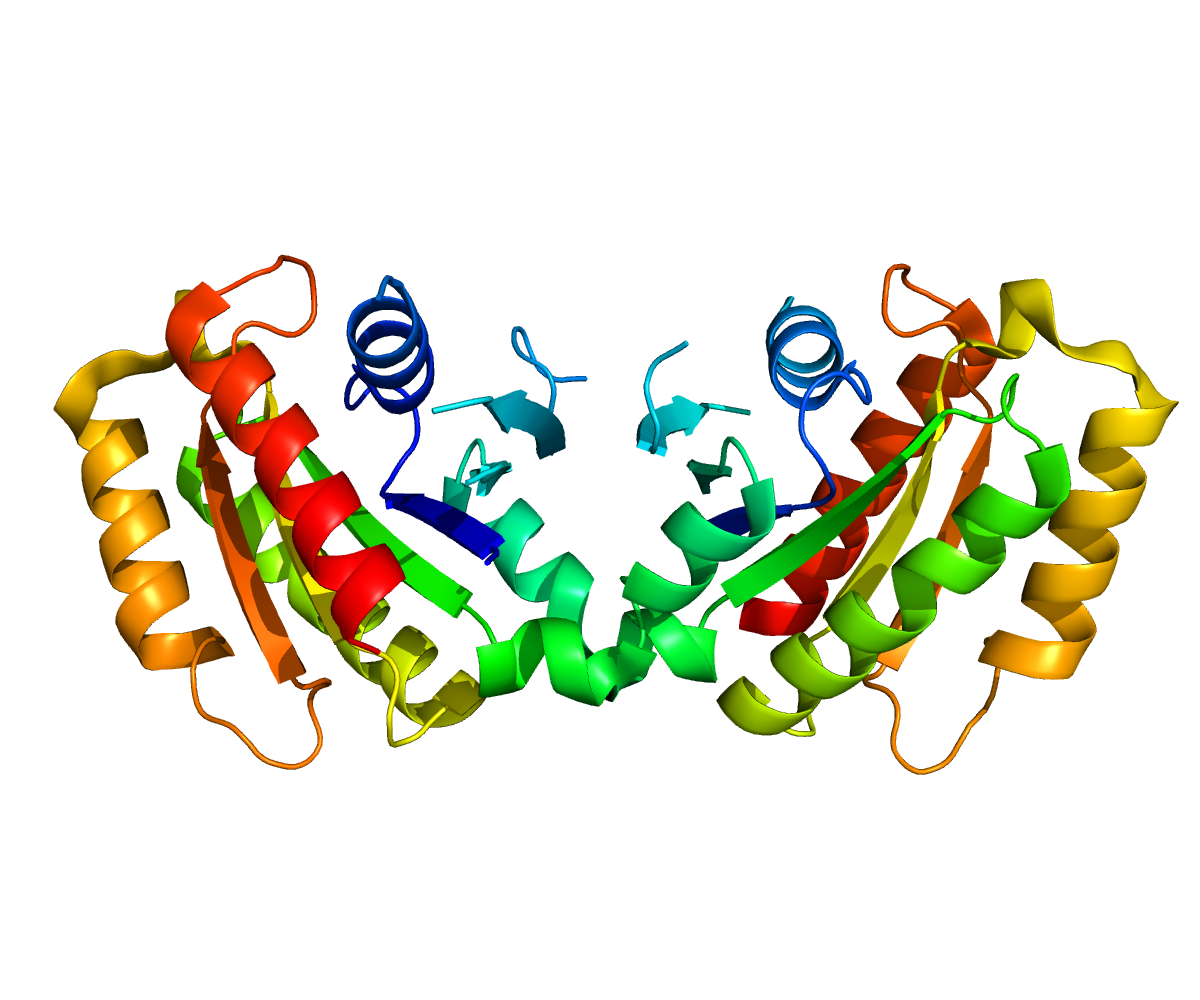

Identifiers
- Aliases: LRRK2, AURA17, DARDARIN, PARK8, RIPK7, ROCO2, leucine-rich repeat kinase 2, leucine rich repeat kinase 2
- External IDs: OMIM: 609007; MGI: 1913975; GeneCards: LRRK2
Available structures
PDB	Ortholog search: PDBe RCSB
PDB	List of PDB id codes 2ZEJ, 3D6T
Enzyme activity
EC #	BRENDA	ExPASy	KEGG	MetaCyc
2.7.11.1	↗	↗	↗	↗
2.7.11.1	↗	↗	↗	↗

Gene location (Human)
Chr.	Chromosome 12 (human)
Band	12q12	Start	40,196,744 bp
Band	12q12	End	40,369,285 bp

Gene location (Mouse)
Chr.	Chromosome 15 (mouse)
Band	15|15 E3	Start	91,557,378 bp
Band	15|15 E3	End	91,700,323 bp
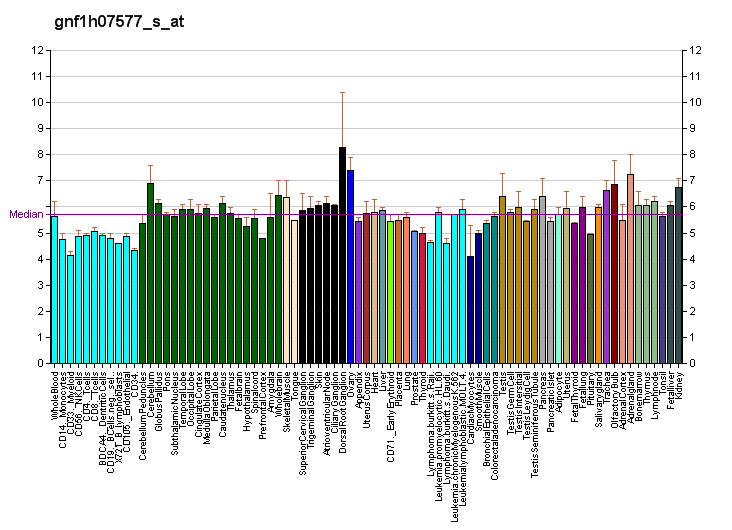

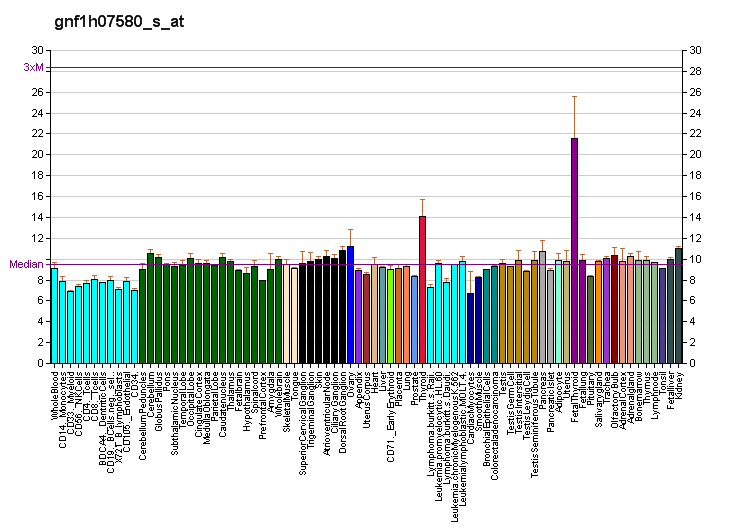
RNA expression pattern
Bgee	Human / Mouse (ortholog); Top expressed in: buccal mucosa cell; monocyte; lower lobe of lung; blood; upper lobe of lung; upper lobe of left lung; right lung; Achilles tendon; granulocyte; visceral pleura / Top expressed in: granulocyte; human kidney; proximal tubule; left lung; left lung lobe; right kidney; superior frontal gyrus; lumbar spinal ganglion; spleen; right lung; More reference expression data
BioGPS	More reference expression data
Gene ontology
Molecular function	protein homodimerization activity; signaling receptor complex adaptor activity; clathrin binding; co-receptor binding; transferase activity; GTPase activator activity; protein kinase activity; protein kinase A binding; peroxidase inhibitor activity; SNARE binding; nucleotide binding; identical protein binding; GTPase activity; syntaxin-1 binding; protein serine/threonine kinase activity; tubulin binding; transmembrane transporter binding; microtubule binding; MAP kinase kinase activity; GTP binding; ATP binding; GTP-dependent protein kinase activity; beta-catenin destruction complex binding; protein binding; kinase activity; actin binding; magnesium ion binding
Cellular component	cytoplasmic vesicle; endosome; extracellular exosome; Wnt signalosome; soma; trans-Golgi network; mitochondrial membranes; synapse; cytoplasm; mitochondrial outer membrane; synaptic vesicle membrane; perikaryon; endoplasmic reticulum; plasma membrane; microvillus; mitochondrial matrix; dendrite cytoplasm; growth cone; cell projection; dendrite; lysosome; neuron projection; Golgi-associated vesicle; mitochondrion; mitochondrial inner membrane; autolysosome; terminal bouton; intracellular anatomical structure; membrane; membrane raft; axon; amphisome; multivesicular body, internal vesicle; synaptic vesicle; inclusion body; cell junction; cytoplasmic side of mitochondrial outer membrane; cytosol; Golgi apparatus; postsynapse; extracellular space; nucleus; intracellular membrane-bounded organelle; caveola neck; endoplasmic reticulum exit site; glutamatergic synapse; presynaptic cytosol; ribonucleoprotein complex
Biological process	lysosome organization; response to oxidative stress; cellular response to dopamine; regulation of autophagy; positive regulation of autophagy; positive regulation of dopamine receptor signaling pathway; regulation of neuroblast proliferation; intracellular distribution of mitochondria; negative regulation of protein processing; negative regulation of protein processing involved in protein targeting to mitochondrion; protein localization to mitochondrion; positive regulation of canonical Wnt signaling pathway; autophagy; neuromuscular junction development; phosphorylation; positive regulation of protein binding; regulation of branching morphogenesis of a nerve; mitochondrion localization; positive regulation of protein autoubiquitination; regulation of synaptic vesicle transport; positive regulation of protein phosphorylation; regulation of kidney size; regulation of synaptic vesicle exocytosis; positive regulation of MAP kinase activity; peptidyl-threonine phosphorylation; MAPK cascade; Wnt signalosome assembly; protein phosphorylation; regulation of synaptic transmission, glutamatergic; excitatory postsynaptic potential; negative regulation of hydrogen peroxide-induced cell death; regulation of dopamine receptor signaling pathway; regulation of membrane potential; protein autophosphorylation; regulation of mitochondrial fission; regulation of neuron maturation; reactive oxygen species metabolic process; positive regulation of programmed cell death; regulation of neuron death; regulation of mitochondrial depolarization; cellular response to oxidative stress; negative regulation of late endosome to lysosome transport; intracellular signal transduction; regulation of lysosomal lumen pH; negative regulation of GTPase activity; locomotory exploration behavior; Golgi organization; canonical Wnt signaling pathway; neuron projection morphogenesis; positive regulation of protein ubiquitination; regulation of canonical Wnt signaling pathway; exploration behavior; cellular response to organic cyclic compound; tangential migration from the subventricular zone to the olfactory bulb; regulation of protein kinase A signaling; calcium-mediated signaling; negative regulation of thioredoxin peroxidase activity by peptidyl-threonine phosphorylation; negative regulation of endoplasmic reticulum stress-induced intrinsic apoptotic signaling pathway; positive regulation of proteasomal ubiquitin-dependent protein catabolic process; negative regulation of neuron death; negative regulation of protein targeting to mitochondrion; peptidyl-serine phosphorylation; determination of adult lifespan; negative regulation of excitatory postsynaptic potential; negative regulation of protein phosphorylation; neuron death; GTP metabolic process; negative regulation of autophagosome assembly; olfactory bulb development; cellular response to starvation; regulation of dendritic spine morphogenesis; cell differentiation; endocytosis; negative regulation of protein binding; mitochondrion organization; cellular response to manganese ion; negative regulation of macroautophagy; regulation of locomotion; positive regulation of GTPase activity; regulation of retrograde transport, endosome to Golgi; regulation of CAMKK-AMPK signaling cascade; positive regulation of histone deacetylase activity; endoplasmic reticulum organization; spermatogenesis; regulation of gene expression; negative regulation of neuron projection development; striatum development; regulation of protein stability; positive regulation of nitric-oxide synthase biosynthetic process; regulation of ER to Golgi vesicle-mediated transport; protein localization to endoplasmic reticulum exit site; neuron projection arborization; regulation of synaptic vesicle endocytosis; positive regulation of synaptic vesicle endocytosis; positive regulation of microglial cell activation; protein import into nucleus
Sources:Amigo / QuickGO
Orthologs
Databases	NCBI: entry; OMA: entry
Species	Human	Mouse
Entrez	120892	66725
Ensembl	ENSG00000188906	ENSMUSG00000036273
UniProt	Q5S007	Q5S006
RefSeq (mRNA)	NM_198578	NM_025730
RefSeq (protein)	NP_940980	NP_080006
Location (UCSC)	Chr 12: 40.2 – 40.37 Mb	Chr 15: 91.56 – 91.7 Mb
PubMed search
- Wikidata
View/Edit Human	View/Edit Mouse

Leucine-rich repeat kinase 2 (LRRK2), also known as dardarin (from the Basque word "dardara" which means trembling) and PARK8 (from early identified association with Parkinson's disease), is a large, multifunctional kinase enzyme that in humans is encoded by the LRRK2 gene. LRRK2 is a member of the leucine-rich repeat kinase family. Variants of this gene are associated with an increased risk of Parkinson's disease and Crohn's disease.

== Function ==
The LRRK2 gene encodes a protein with an armadillo repeats (ARM) region, an ankyrin repeat (ANK) region, a leucine-rich repeat (LRR) domain, a kinase domain, a RAS domain, a GTPase domain, and a WD40 domain. Possible cellular functions of LRRK2 include the cytoskeleton, membrane trafficking, iron homoeostasis and mitochondrial function.

LRRK2 interacts with the C-terminal R2 RING finger domain of parkin, and parkin interacted with the COR domain of LRRK2. Expression of mutant LRRK2 induced apoptotic cell death in neuroblastoma cells and in mouse cortical neurons.

Expression of LRRK2 mutants implicated in autosomal dominant Parkinson's disease causes shortening and simplification of the dendritic tree in vivo and in cultured neurons. This is mediated in part by alterations in macroautophagy, and can be prevented by protein kinase A regulation of the autophagy protein LC3. The G2019S and R1441C mutations elicit post-synaptic calcium imbalance, leading to excess mitochondrial clearance from dendrites by mitophagy. LRRK2 is also a substrate for chaperone-mediated autophagy.

Disease-associated mutant alleles of LRRK2 (R1441C, G2019S, I2020T) generally show elevated kinase activity.

LRRK2 activity has been tied to generation of reactive-oxygen species (ROS) which are associated with Parkinson's disease pathogenesis. This activity is dependent on LRRK2-mediated phosphorylation of NADPH oxidase 2 (NOX2). Specifically, LRRK2 activity promotes activatory phosphorylation of the p47^{phox} subunit of NOX2 at S345.

== Clinical significance ==
Mutations in this gene have been associated with Parkinson's disease type 8.

The G2019S mutation results in enhanced kinase activity, and is a relatively common cause of familial Parkinson's disease in Caucasians. It may also cause sporadic Parkinson's disease. The mutated Gly amino acid is conserved in all kinase domains of all species.

The G2019S mutation is one of a small number of LRRK2 mutations proven to cause Parkinson's disease. Of these, G2019S is the most common in the Western World, accounting for ~2% of all Parkinson's disease cases in North American Caucasians. This mutation is enriched in certain populations, being found in approximately 20% of all Ashkenazi Jewish Parkinson's disease patients and in approximately 40% of all Parkinson's disease patients of North African Berber Arab ancestry. In 2024, a genetic study supported and extended prior studies suggesting that LRRK2 p.G2019S heterozygotes are descendants of a common ancestral founder that originated in North African Berber Arabs at least 40 (95% CI 28–52) generations ago (1200 YBP 95% CI 840–1560).

Unexpectedly, genome-wide association studies have found an association between LRRK2 and Crohn's disease as well as with Parkinson's disease, suggesting that the two diseases share common pathways.

Attempts have been made to grow crystals of the LRRK2 aboard the International Space Station, as the low-gravity environment renders the protein less susceptible to sedimentation and convection, and thus more crystallizable.

Mutations in the LRRK2 gene is the main factor in contributing to the genetic development of Parkinson's disease, and over 100 mutations in this gene have been shown to increase the chance of PD development. These mutations are most commonly seen in North African Arab Berber, Chinese, and Japanese populations.

=== Therapeutics development ===
Multiple preclinical studies have found that inhibition or silencing of LRRK2 may be therapeutically beneficial for treatment of Parkinson's disease. There have been efforts to develop therapeutics for Parkinson's disease targeting LRRK2, including LRRK2 inhibitors and antisense oligonucleotides (ASOs) targeting LRRK2.

In May 2026, Denali and Biogen halted development of BIIB122 after a clinical trial failed to meet its primary or secondary endpoints, despite success at inhibiting LRRK2 kinase. Other clinical trials continued.
