= Anchorage Times =

Newspaper in Anchorage, Alaska

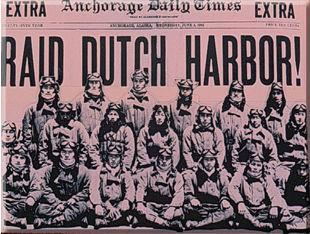
- Imagery associated with the Aleutian Islands campaign, which includes the front page headline of the June 3, 1942 edition of the Times.
- Type: Daily newspaper
- Publisher: Robert Atwood
- Editor: Robert Atwood
- Founded: 1915
- Ceased publication: 1992
- Language: English
- Headquarters: Anchorage, Alaska

The Anchorage Times was a daily newspaper published in Anchorage, Alaska, that became known for the pro-business political stance of longtime publisher and editor, Robert Atwood. Competition from the McClatchy-owned Anchorage Daily News forced it out of business in 1992.

== History ==
=== Origins ===
In October 1914, The Sward Gateway Company, publisher of The Seward Gateway, purchased the Seward Tribune and shipped its printing plant aboard the SS Alameda to Knik, Alaska for the purpose of launching a new paper in that city. The first issue of The Knik News was published on October 17, 1914. Ted Needham was editor. A year later he traveled to Juneau after his wife grew ill and L. Frank Shaw took over the paper's management. Shaw soon moved the paper to Ship Creek.

In May 1915, Bernard E. Stone bought out Charles E. Herron and then become the company's sole owner. Stone then sold Knick News to Cook Inlet Publishing Co. On May 27, 1915, an extra edition of the paper called the Cook Inlet Pioneer and Knik News was launched. On June 5, 1915, the first official edition of the Pioneer and News was published in Anchorage by the Cook Inlet Publishing Co. In September 1915, the company purchased the plant of the defunct Cordova Alaskan from Will Steel and planned to ship it to Anchorage to relaunch the Pioneer as a daily, which officially appeared on Oct. 1, 1915.

Herron acquired the Pioneer in May 1916 and named Harry G. Steel as editor. On May 24, Herron changed its name to The Anchorage Daily Times & Cook Inlet Pioneer. On May 29, 1917, it became the Anchorage Daily Times. In December 1924, the Times was sold at public auction cover debts to a group headed by Bank of Alaska president Edward A. Rasmuson and Jacob B. Gottstein.

=== Bob Atwood takes the reins ===
In June 1935, 28-year-old Robert Bruce Atwood, Edward Rasmuson's son-in-law, arrived in Anchorage from Worcester, Massachusetts. Atwood had been brought to Alaska by Rasmuson to assume the position of editor-publisher of the paper, which at that time had a circulation of 650. He would hold the position until 1990.

During the war years, Anchorage's population swelled from less than 8,000 to over 43,000, overtaking Fairbanks as Alaska's largest city, and making the Times Alaska's largest daily newspaper.

In 1947, Alaska territorial governor Ernest Gruening appointed Atwood to chair the Alaska Statehood Committee. In Atwood's hands, the Anchorage Daily Times became a prominent voice for statehood.

=== Competition ===
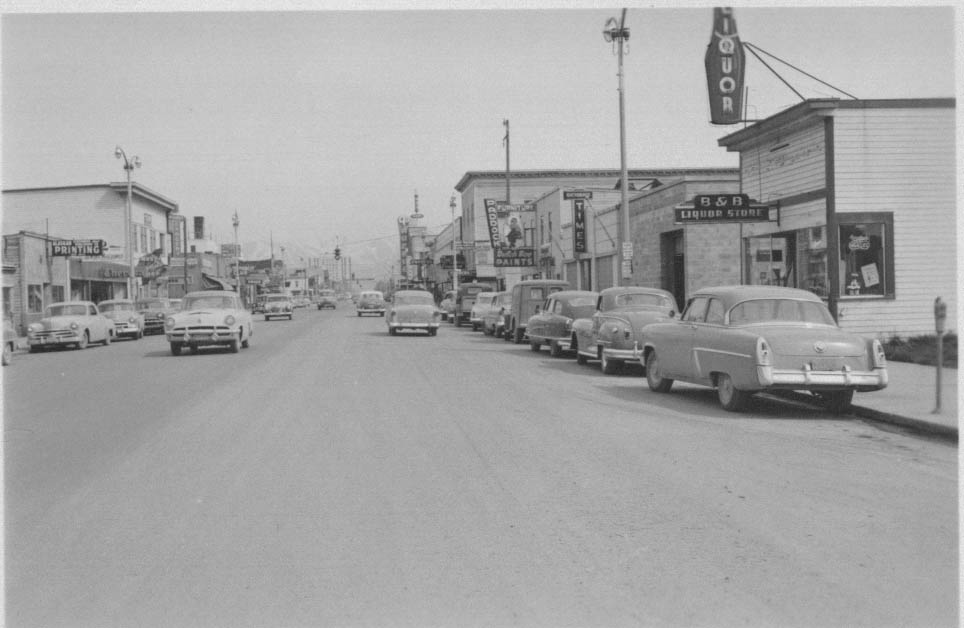
Fourth Avenue in Anchorage in 1953, looking east from near I Street. The offices of the Times are several buildings down on the right. The Times would remain in that location until its closing, greatly expanding its offices and plant during the 1970s. That latter building stands today as the administrative headquarters of the Alaska Court System.

A rival, the Anchorage Daily News, began publishing in 1948, having begun as a weekly two years earlier. Although initially more of an editorial challenge than a competitive threat, the contest would influence the course of both newspapers over the next few decades. In 1974, the Times and the Daily News entered into a joint operating agreement in order to reduce costs. Later that year, the Times would begin issuing a Sunday edition. The Daily News had been publishing Sundays since 1965.

The Anchorage Daily Times was renamed the Anchorage Times in 1976. In 1977, the Daily News filed suit against the Times, claiming violations of the joint operating agreement. Atwood countered that the Daily News was really to blame for their own troubles, citing the discontinuation of subsidies to the paper by Ted Field, the son of Daily News publisher Kay Fanning and heir to the Marshall Field fortune.

The papers reached an out-of-court settlement in 1978, and the agreement was terminated in 1979. In the short term, this was a setback for the struggling Daily News, which was compelled to seek outside investors. The Sacramento-based McClatchy newspaper chain, bought the Anchorage Daily News that same year.

McClatchy's investment fueled an all-out circulation war. By 1984, readership of the Times had fallen behind that of the Daily News. In an interview with the Alaska Journal of Commerce, Times editor and assistant publisher, Bill Tobin, traced the paper's ultimate failure to the late 1980s, and to publisher Robert Atwood's resistance of the morning format. The Times remained an afternoon paper, whereas the Daily News had been publishing a morning edition since 1964.

=== Veco and the Voice of the Times ===
In 1989, Atwood sold the Times to Veco Corporation, an oilfield service company seeking to invest its profits from the clean-up efforts following the Exxon Valdez oil spill. The new management was not able to turn the paper around, and after two and a half years and claimed losses of $10 million, the newspaper was sold to McClatchy, which then made the decision to shut down the Anchorage Times. The last issue of the Anchorage Times was published on June 3, 1992.

A ten-year deal was inked to maintain the editorial voice of the defunct paper by way of a half-page Voice of the Times section opposite the Daily News editorial page. In 2002, this deal was renewed for another five years. On May 10, 2007, several days after Veco CEO and Voice of the Times publisher Bill Allen pleaded guilty to political bribery charges, the Daily News announced that it would terminate the agreement at the end of that month. In June, the Voice of the Times began publishing an exclusively online edition. In October 2008, the Voice of the Times announced that it would stop publishing, with a probable final date of November 1, 2008.

== Known editors ==
- Frank L. Shaw (or L.F. Shaw), 1915–1916, 1916–1919
- Harry G. Steel, 1916
- James Wilbur Ward, 1919–1920
- Edgar L. Bedell, 1920–1925
- Roy Gratton Southworth, 1925–1927, 1931–1933
- Charles Fisk, 1927–1931
- Charles Settlemier, 1933–1935
- Robert Atwood, 1935–1990
- Bill Tobin, 1963–1992
- Fred Dickey, 1980–1981
- J. Randolph Murray, 1989–1992

== See also ==
- Alaska Statehood Act
- History of Anchorage, Alaska
- List of defunct newspapers of the United States
