= Knik =

Knik may refer to the following entities in Alaska:

== Landforms and natural phenomena ==
- Knik Arm, the northernmost extension of Cook Inlet
- Knik Glacier, a glacier in the Chugach Mountains
- Knik River, which runs from Knik Glacier to Knik Arm
- Knik wind

== Media ==
- KMVN, a radio station at 105.7 FM, licensed to Anchorage, known by the call letters KNIK-FM from 1961 to 2009
- KNIK-LD, a low-power television station on channel 6, licensed to Anchorage
- Knik TV Mast, a guyed mast located between Anchorage and Wasilla which transmits multiple Anchorage-area radio and television stations

== Populated places in Matanuska-Susitna Borough ==
- Knik-Fairview, Alaska, a census-designated place (CDP) south of Wasilla
- Knik River, Alaska, a CDP southeast of Butte and Palmer
- Knik Site (Old Knik), a former settlement and museum listed on the National Register of Historic Places

== Proposed development projects ==
- Knik Arm Bridge, a proposal for a bridge across Knik Arm
- Knik Arm ferry, a proposal to make the same crossing of Knik Arm with a ferry

== Other ==
- Knik Tribal Council, see Denaʼina § Language and bands
