= ATP13A2 =

Protein-coding gene found in humans

Identifiers
- Aliases: ATP13A2, CLN12, HSA9947, KRPPD, PARK9, ATPase 13A2, SPG78, ATPase cation transporting 13A2
- External IDs: OMIM: 610513; MGI: 1922022; GeneCards: ATP13A2

Gene location (Human)
Chr.	Chromosome 1 (human)
Band	1p36.13	Start	16,985,958 bp
Band	1p36.13	End	17,011,928 bp

Gene location (Mouse)
Chr.	Chromosome 4 (mouse)
Band	4|4 D3	Start	140,714,184 bp
Band	4|4 D3	End	140,734,641 bp
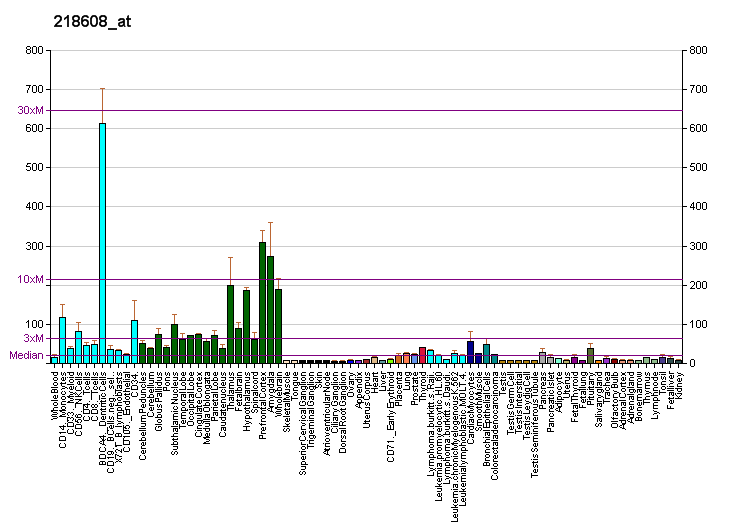
RNA expression pattern
Bgee	Human / Mouse (ortholog); Top expressed in: right frontal lobe; right hemisphere of cerebellum; prefrontal cortex; anterior cingulate cortex; pons; Brodmann area 9; anterior pituitary; amygdala; hypothalamus; nucleus accumbens / Top expressed in: external carotid artery; internal carotid artery; stroma of bone marrow; dorsal tegmental nucleus; perirhinal cortex; neural layer of retina; motor neuron; entorhinal cortex; superior colliculus; superior frontal gyrus; More reference expression data
BioGPS	More reference expression data
Gene ontology
Molecular function	nucleotide binding; metal ion binding; ATPase activity; protein binding; hydrolase activity; ATP binding; cupric ion binding; phosphatidic acid binding; zinc ion binding; phosphatidylinositol-3,5-bisphosphate binding; manganese ion binding; P-type calcium transporter activity; ATPase-coupled cation transmembrane transporter activity
Cellular component	integral component of membrane; membrane; vesicle membrane; integral component of plasma membrane; transport vesicle; lysosomal lumen; lysosome; vesicle; multivesicular body; neuron projection; integral component of lysosomal membrane; multivesicular body membrane; autophagosome; late endosome; soma; lysosomal membrane
Biological process	cellular cation homeostasis; cation transport; ion transmembrane transport; regulation of autophagy of mitochondrion; regulation of autophagosome size; regulation of endopeptidase activity; regulation of mitochondrion organization; cellular response to oxidative stress; cellular calcium ion homeostasis; cellular response to manganese ion; cellular iron ion homeostasis; protein autophosphorylation; cellular zinc ion homeostasis; autophagosome organization; regulation of glucosylceramidase activity; regulation of chaperone-mediated autophagy; negative regulation of neuron death; zinc ion homeostasis; regulation of macroautophagy; regulation of intracellular protein transport; positive regulation of protein secretion; positive regulation of exosomal secretion; peptidyl-aspartic acid autophosphorylation; negative regulation of lysosomal protein catabolic process; cellular response to zinc ion; calcium ion transmembrane transport; regulation of lysosomal protein catabolic process; extracellular exosome biogenesis; polyamine transmembrane transport
Sources:Amigo / QuickGO
Orthologs
Databases	NCBI: entry; OMA: entry
Species	Human	Mouse
Entrez	23400	74772
Ensembl	ENSG00000159363	ENSMUSG00000036622
UniProt	Q9NQ11; Q8N4D4	Q9CTG6
RefSeq (mRNA)	NM_001141973; NM_001141974; NM_022089	NM_001164366; NM_029097; NM_001379619; NM_001379620; NM_001379621 NM_001379622
RefSeq (protein)	NP_001135445; NP_001135446; NP_071372; NP_001135445.1; NP_001135446.1	NP_001157838; NP_083373; NP_001366548; NP_001366549; NP_001366550 NP_001366551
Location (UCSC)	Chr 1: 16.99 – 17.01 Mb	Chr 4: 140.71 – 140.73 Mb
PubMed search
- Wikidata
View/Edit Human	View/Edit Mouse

Probable cation-transporting ATPase 13A2 is an enzyme that in humans is encoded by the ATP13A2 gene that is involved in the transport of divalent transition metal cations. It appears to protect cells from manganese and zinc toxicity, possibly by causing cellular efflux and/or lysosomal sequestration; and from iron toxicity, possibly by preserving lysosome integrity against iron-induced lipid peroxidation. However, it potentiates the toxic effects of cadmium and nickel on developing neurites, and of the widely used herbicide paraquat possibly by increasing polyamine uptake.

Deficiency is associated with spastic paraplegia and Kufor-Rakeb syndrome, in which there is progressive parkinsonism with dementia.
