= CHCHD2 =

Protein-coding gene in humans

Identifiers
- Aliases: CHCHD2, C7orf17, MNRR1, NS2TP, PARK22, coiled-coil-helix-coiled-coil-helix domain containing 2, MIX17B
- External IDs: OMIM: 616244; MGI: 1261428; GeneCards: CHCHD2

Gene location (Human)
Chr.	Chromosome 7 (human)
Band	7p11.2	Start	56,101,573 bp
Band	7p11.2	End	56,106,476 bp

Gene location (Mouse)
Chr.	Chromosome 5 (mouse)
Band	5|5 G1.3	Start	129,909,997 bp
Band	5|5 G1.3	End	129,916,311 bp
RNA expression pattern
Bgee	Human / Mouse (ortholog); Top expressed in: right adrenal cortex; left adrenal gland; left adrenal cortex; gonad; Brodmann area 9; gastrocnemius muscle; anterior pituitary; ganglionic eminence; mucosa of transverse colon; right frontal lobe / Top expressed in: right kidney; proximal tubule; quadriceps femoris muscle; neural tube; mesencephalon; heart; muscle of thigh; muscle tissue; human kidney; primary oocyte; More reference expression data
BioGPS	n/a
Gene ontology
Molecular function	sequence-specific DNA binding; transcription factor binding; protein binding
Cellular component	nucleus; mitochondrial intermembrane space; mitochondrion
Biological process	regulation of cellular response to hypoxia; transcription, DNA-templated; positive regulation of transcription by RNA polymerase II; mitochondrion organization
Sources:Amigo / QuickGO
Orthologs
Databases	NCBI: entry; OMA: entry
Species	Human	Mouse
Entrez	51142	14004
Ensembl	ENSG00000106153	ENSMUSG00000070493
UniProt	Q9Y6H1	Q9D1L0
RefSeq (mRNA)	NM_016139; NM_001320327	NM_024166
RefSeq (protein)	NP_001307256; NP_057223	NP_077128
Location (UCSC)	Chr 7: 56.1 – 56.11 Mb	Chr 5: 129.91 – 129.92 Mb
PubMed search
- Wikidata
View/Edit Human	View/Edit Mouse

Coiled-coil-helix-coiled-coil-helix domain containing 2 is a protein that in humans is encoded by the CHCHD2 gene.

== Function ==
The protein encoded by this gene belongs to a class of eukaryotic CX(9)C proteins characterized by four cysteine residues spaced ten amino acids apart from one another. These residues form disulfide linkages that define a CHCH fold. In response to stress, the protein translocates from the mitochondrial intermembrane space to the nucleus where it binds to a highly conserved 13 nucleotide oxygen responsive element in the promoter of cytochrome oxidase 4I2, a subunit of the terminal enzyme of the electron transport chain.

In concert with recombination signal sequence-binding protein J, binding of this protein activates the oxygen responsive element at four percent oxygen. In addition, it has been shown that this protein is a negative regulator of mitochondria-mediated apoptosis. In response to apoptotic stimuli, mitochondrial levels of this protein decrease, allowing BCL2-associated X protein to oligomerize and activate the Caspase Cascade. Pseudogenes of this gene are found on multiple chromosomes. Alternative splicing results in multiple transcript variants. [provided by RefSeq, Feb 2016].
