= Bob Atwood =

American journalist (1907–1997)

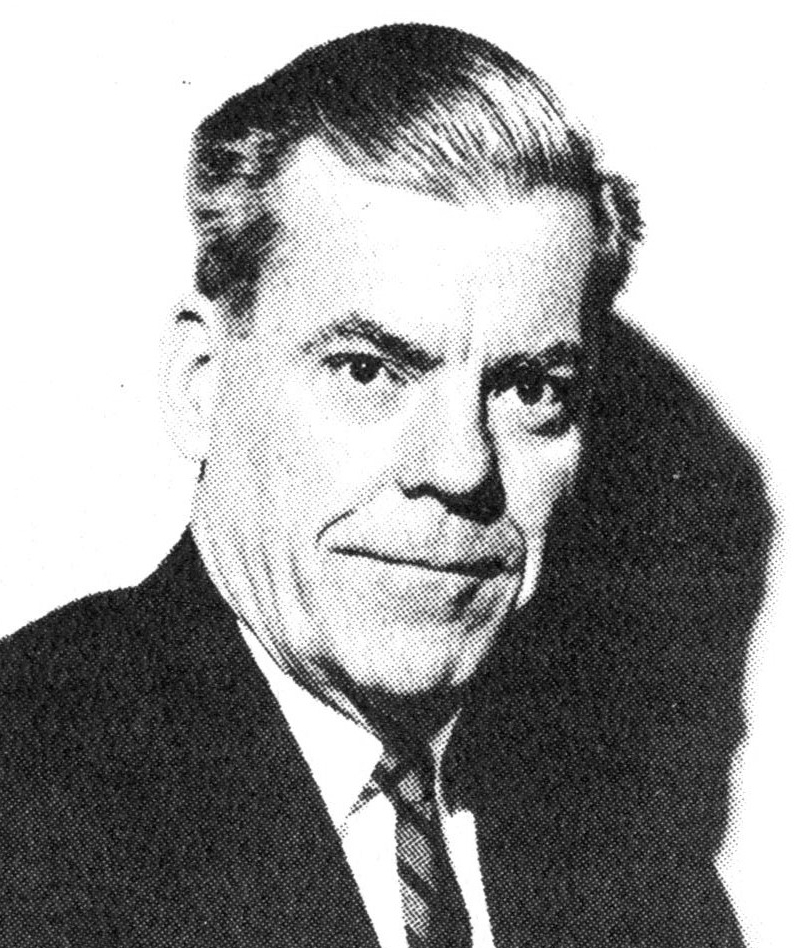
- Born: Robert Bruce Atwood; March 31, 1907; Chicago, Illinois, U.S.
- Died: January 10, 1997 (aged 89); Anchorage, Alaska, U.S.
- Education: Clark University
- Spouse: Evangeline Atwood
- Children: 2

Robert Bruce Atwood (March 31, 1907 – January 10, 1997) was an American journalist who served as the long-time editor and publisher of the Anchorage Times. He was also an early advocate of Alaska statehood.

== Biography ==
Robert Bruce Atwood, known as Bob Atwood or Robert Atwood, was born on March 31, 1907, in Chicago, Illinois. He graduated from Clark University with a Bachelor of the Arts degree in journalism, and in 1932, married social worker Evangeline Atwood (née Rasmuson), the older sister of Anchorage Mayor Elmer E. Rasmuson. They had two daughters, Marilyn and Elaine.

=== Anchorage Times and Alaska statehood ===
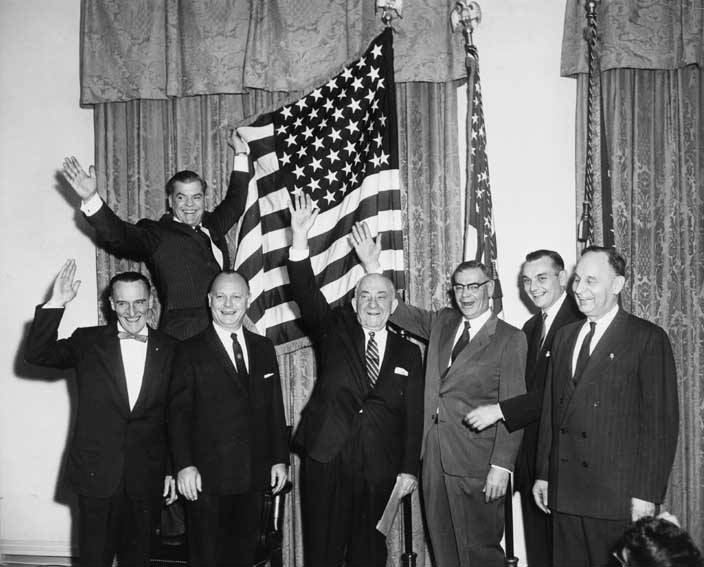
Bob Atwood (top) unfurls the 49-star U.S. flag following President Dwight D. Eisenhower's signing of Alaska's statehood proclamation, January 3, 1959

Atwood moved to Anchorage, Alaska, in 1935. With the help of his father-in-law, he purchased the struggling Anchorage Daily Times. Under his guidance, it became Alaska's largest daily newspaper.

In 1949, the Alaska Territorial Legislature formed the Alaska Statehood Committee, appointing Atwood as chairman. His pro-statehood lobbying efforts included visits to Washington, D.C., and a steady stream of articles in his newspaper, such as a 1955 editorial where he argued that whereas commonwealth status was "wonderful" for Puerto Rico, "it wouldn't give Alaskans self-government, control of resources, tax exemptions or any of a number of benefits claimed by its supporters here."

In 1954, Atwood partnered with his brother-in-law Elmer E. Rasmuson to invest in the lease of potential oil fields on the Kenai Peninsula. The investment generated a fortune after Richfield Oil Corporation discovered oil in 1957 near the Swanson River.

On June 30, 1958, the United States Senate passed the Alaska Statehood Act, and President Eisenhower signed it on July 7. Atwood's Anchorage Daily Times celebrated with a headline in six-inch type: “WE’RE IN”, which became a defining finish to the fight for Alaskan statehood.

On January 3, 1959, Atwood was present (along with Senators Bob Bartlett and Ernest Gruening, Representative Ralph Julian Rivers and Territorial Governors Waino Hendrickson and Mike Stepovich) in the Cabinet Room when President Dwight D. Eisenhower signed the proclamation that made Alaska the 49th state admitted into the United States.

=== Philanthropy ===
In 1962, Atwood endowed the Atwood Foundation to promote education and the arts. In 1979, he established the Atwood Chair of Journalism at the University of Alaska Anchorage.

The Alaska Center for the Performing Arts was constructed in 1989, with the largest performance space designated as the Evangeline Atwood Concert Hall.

== Later life ==
Beginning in 1959 and continuing until the 1980s, Atwood unsuccessfully campaigned for the capital of Alaska to be moved from Juneau to Anchorage, due to Anchorage's growing influence as the population center of the state, with the Anchorage Metropolitan Area holding half of the state's population.

In 1990, Robert Atwood stepped down as editor and sold the Anchorage Times to oil tycoon Bill Allen.

== Death ==
Atwood died in Anchorage, Alaska, on January 10, 1997, ten years after the death of his wife.

== Legacy ==
At the time of his death, Robert Atwood was collaborating with journalist John Strohmeyer on a biography. After Atwood's death, Strohmeyer completed the work under the title Alaska Titan. But before it could be published, Atwood's daughter, Elaine, sued to prevent it from being distributed. In 1999, Strohmeyer and Elaine Atwood entered into an agreement giving Elaine Atwood two years to produce her own biography, to be entitled Bob Atwood's Alaska. Bob Atwood's Alaska did not appear until after Elaine Atwood's death in 2003.

In 1998, the Robert B. Atwood Building at 550 W. Seventh Avenue in Anchorage was named by the Alaska State Legislature. The Atwood name also appears in the Atwood Center at Alaska Pacific University.

== Bibliography ==
- Atwood, Robert B. Bob Atwood's Alaska: The Memoirs of a Legendary Newspaper Man 2003 (ISBN 0-9740036-1-1)
