= Citizen Power =

2008 book by Mike Gravel

Citizen Power: A Mandate for Change
- Author: Mike Gravel
- Language: English
- Genre: Politics
- Publisher: Authorhouse
- Publication date: January 23, 2008
- Publication place: United States
- Media type: Paperback
- Pages: 256
- ISBN: 978-1-4343-4315-4
- OCLC: 192170621
- Dewey Decimal: 320.60973 22
- LC Class: JK271 .G728 2008

Citizen Power: A Mandate for Change is a 2008 book on American politics by 2008 United States presidential candidate Mike Gravel, published by Authorhouse. It describes the numerous efforts that Gravel has experienced throughout his political career as an Alaska state legislator and United States Senator from the 1960s, 1970s, and into the 1980s. His blueprint for a ballot initiative within the Federal government of the United States, known as the National Initiative, is also detailed greatly. Ralph Nader introduces the former senator in a foreword.

Cover of the 1972 edition.

The book is a reissue and revision of Citizen Power: A People's Platform, which was authored by Gravel and published in 1972 by Holt, Rinehart and Winston (284 pages, ISBN 0-03-091465-5). The original edition was published at the height of Gravel's national visibility following his actions against the Nixon administration regarding the Pentagon Papers and the Vietnam War. It discussed not just Nixon and Vietnam, but also issues such as the environment, energy policy, taxation policy, governmental reform, and health care and other socio-economic matters, and Gravel's proposed solutions to them. The book's focus was on the benefits that would come with greater citizen participation in government, and its proposal for a constitutional amendment to permit enactment of federal laws by public referendum would presage much of Gravel's future political efforting.

The 2008 edition also expands on ideas that he has been able to realize when he was off the scene of American politics for more than two decades. Gravel also points out that some of his views on issues from the 1970s are still relevant in the 21st century, and still play a part in modern society. He also on some issues points out that his opinion was naïve, and expands on what he currently believes the actual answer should be. Finally, he describes the process Americans can undertake to become empowered as lawmakers in partnership with their elected legislators.

Gravel explicitly used his 2008 presidential campaign to promote the release of the book, even after switching from the Democratic Party to Libertarian Party in March 2008.
