= 1974 United States Senate election in Alaska =

- November 5, 1974
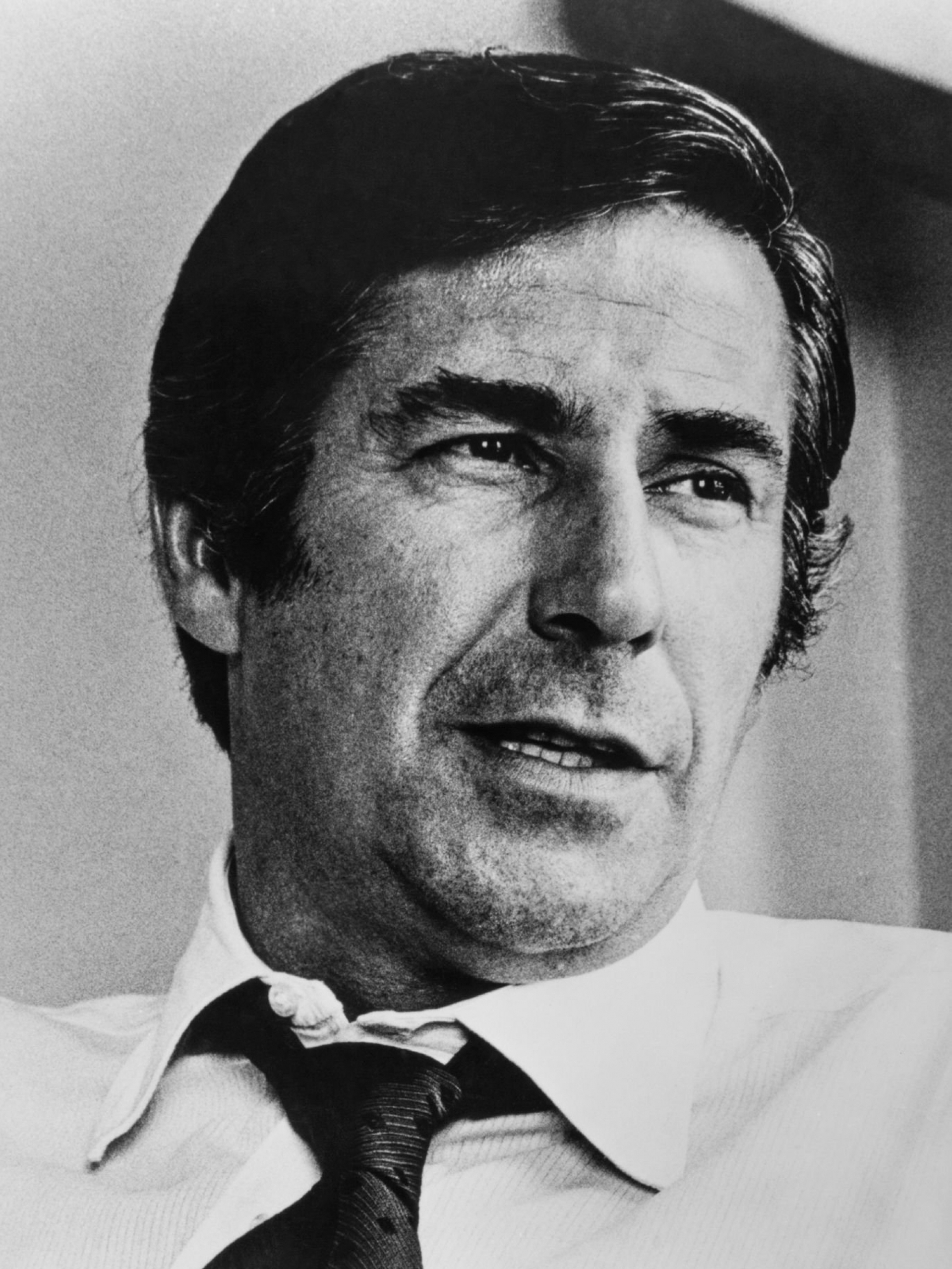

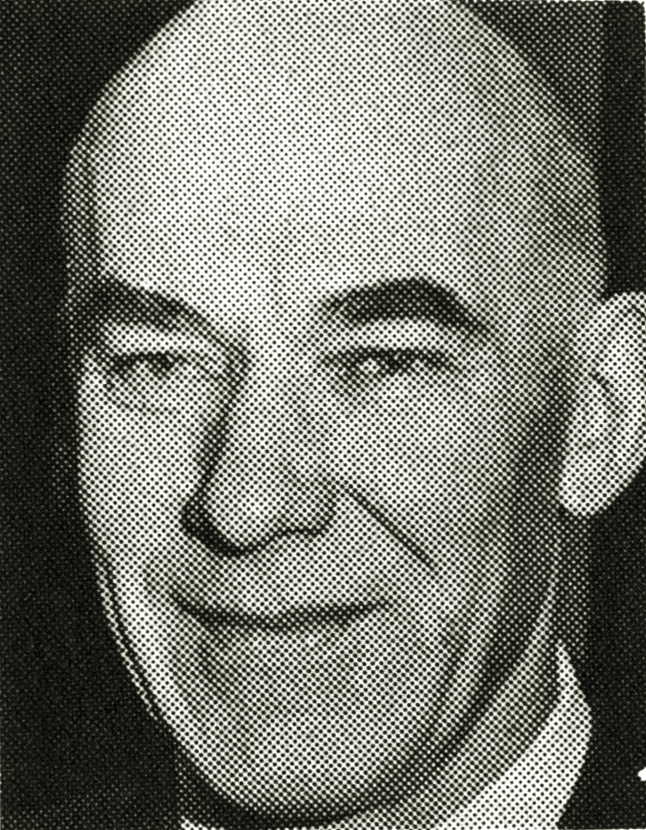
Nominee	Mike Gravel	C. R. Lewis
Party	Democratic	Republican
Popular vote	54,361	38,914
Percentage	58.28%	41.72%
- Gravel: 50–60% 60–70% 70–80% 80–90% Lewis: 50–60%
U.S. senator before election
Mike Gravel
Democratic
Elected U.S. Senator
Mike Gravel
Democratic

The 1974 United States Senate election in Alaska took place on November 5, 1974. Incumbent Democratic U.S. Senator Mike Gravel was re-elected to a second term in office, defeating Republican State Senator Clyde "C.R." Lewis. This is the last time that a member of the Democratic Party has won the Class 3 Senate seat in Alaska. It is also the last time a person not named Murkowski has won this seat. This was the last time Democrats won an Alaska U.S. Senate race until 2008.

== Primary election ==
=== Democratic ===
- Mike Gravel, incumbent U.S. senator
- Dick Greuel, former speaker of the Alaska House of Representatives
- Gene Guess, former speaker of the Alaska House of Representatives and candidate for Senate in 1972
- Donald W. Hobbs

==== Results ====
U.S. Senate primary results
Party	Candidate	Votes	%
Democratic	Mike Gravel (incumbent)	22,834	54.3
Democratic	Gene Guess	15,090	35.9
Democratic	Dick Greuel	3,367	8.0
Democratic	Donald W. Hobbs	756	1.8
Total votes		42,047	100.00

=== Republican ===
- Bob Aaron
- Merle Gnagy
- Clyde "C.R." Lewis, state senator from Anchorage
- Terry Miller, state senator from North Pole
- Red Stevens

==== Results ====
U.S. Senate primary results
Party	Candidate	Votes	%
Republican	Clyde "C.R." Lewis	21,065	52.6
Republican	Terry Miller	16,336	40.8
Republican	Red Stevens	2,207	5.5
Republican	Bob M. Aaron	203	0.5
Republican	Merle W. Gnagy	192	0.4
Total votes		40,003	100.00

== General election ==
1974 United States Senate election in Alaska
Party	Candidate	Votes	%	±%
Democratic	Mike Gravel (incumbent)	54,361	58.28%	
Republican	Clyde "C.R." Lewis	38,914	41.72%	
Total votes		93,275	100.00%	
Democratic hold		Swing		

== See also ==
- 1974 United States Senate elections
