= Dick Greuel =

American politician

Richard Joseph Greuel (April 18, 1928 – December 3, 2013) was an American radio announcer, real estate businessman, and Democratic politician in the U.S. territory and state of Alaska. Greuel served as speaker of the Alaska Territorial House of Representatives during the last territorial legislature, and would also serve in the Alaska House of Representatives following statehood.

== Biography ==
Richard Greuel was born in New Holstein, Wisconsin on April 18, 1928. Greuel came to Fairbanks, Alaska through his service in the U.S. Army and stayed there after leaving the Army. He spent a number of years working for Fairbanks radio station KFAR as an announcer and program director. He would later go on to work in real estate. Greuel was Presbyterian.

== Political career ==
Greuel was a member of the Alaska Territorial House of Representatives from 1953 to 1958, serving as Speaker from 1957 to 1958. He was later a delegate to the 1960 Democratic National Convention that nominated John F. Kennedy for President of the United States. Greuel would later serve in the state House of Representatives in 1959. He also served on one of Governor William A. Egan's advisory redistricting boards.

== Personal life ==
Richard Greuel was first married to Viola "Val" Forth, who was a fellow announcer at KFAR. He later married Patricia McSwaggerty in June 1962 and they remained married until his death on December 3, 2013. He was in the real estate business in Fairbanks, Alaska and also served on the Fairbanks City Council from 1951 until 1957 and in 1973. He died in Anoka, Minnesota.
