= National initiative =

Organization

National Initiative for Democracy
- Founder: Mike Gravel
- Type: Public
- Purpose: A government that allows the people to work in partnership with elected officials.
- Location: Philadelphia, Pennsylvania
- Region served: United States
- Key people: Mike Gravel (Chair) Tom Lombardi (Treasurer)
- Website: National Initiative for Democracy

The National Initiative is a proposed process to petition an initiative at the federal level in the United States via a national vote on the national ballot measure. While some U.S. states allow direct or indirect initiatives, there are currently no national initiatives in the United States.

The process and system for a national initiative was proposed in the early 2000s by the late Mike Gravel, a former U.S. Senator, and the Democracy Foundation, a non-profit non-governmental organization. The set of proposals, referred to by its proponents as the National Initiative for Democracy (and later renamed National Citizens Initiative for Democracy in 2012), gathered endorsements from author, activist and former independent candidate for President of the United States Ralph Nader; linguist, philosopher, political activist and author Noam Chomsky; author of The Tao of Democracy and co-director of the non-profit Co-Intelligence Institute Tom Atlee; and socialist thought-leader and author of A People's History of the United States Howard Zinn.

== National Initiative for Democracy (USA) ==
The National Initiative for Democracy (NI4D) is a proposed constitutional amendment (Democracy Amendment) which recognizes the people's right to make laws at the local, state and federal level of every jurisdiction in the country and a federal law (Democracy Act) which spells out orderly procedures for the people to develop and vote on laws.

"The National Initiative does not change or eliminate Congress, the President, or the Judicial Branch of government. Laws created by initiative must still stand up in the courts just like laws created by Congress." The National Initiative adds an additional check—the people—to America's system of checks and balances, while setting up a working partnership between the People and their elected representatives.

The framers of the National Initiative for Democracy believe the law-making branch of government (Congress) no longer effectively represents the will of the American people. They believe as America continues to grow and diversify, Congress can only become less and less effective in representing the masses; that the gap between the elite decision-making few and the ever diversifying average citizen can only be bridged through direct citizen participation in governing. They contend that while "voting out" representatives from office or enacting term limits is a good idea, those actions do not address the basic, fundamental flaw of governing an enormous, increasingly heterogeneous population by a tiny, elite few. They believe that recent technological advances have made it possible for all Americans to voice their opinions on policies and laws which affect their lives; technology that did not exist in 18th century America, when the Constitution was written.

The National Initiative for Democracy believes direct citizen participation in law-making is the sovereign right of all Americans and should no longer be the exclusive right of Congress (at the federal level). Since it does not seek to abolish Congress, the States' Constitutional right to a representative form of government stated in Article I, Section 1, remains unaffected. The Supreme Court has recognized the Constitutional right of citizens to make laws at the state level but oddly, not at the federal. The National Initiative believes most of the existing state initiative processes have the right idea but are terribly flawed. NI4D designed their proposal to specifically address those shortcomings. Their proposal encompasses a unique, multi-step, deliberative process, by which citizens can initiate and enact laws. A process they believe has eliminated, to the further extent possible, the feared "mob rule" mentality.

By 2009, 24 US states had an initiative process in place at the state level. The proposed National Initiative would be somewhat similar to those already in place at the state level, but they would differ in the following significant ways:

1. An independent Electoral Trust would be established consisting of a Board of Trustees and a Director. The Board of Trustees shall consist of 53 members: one member elected by the citizens of each of the 50 states, the District of Columbia, Puerto Rico and the Territories of the United States. The Director, except for the first Director, shall be appointed by majority vote of the Board of Trustees. The Board of Directors of the Democracy Foundation shall appoint the first Director. A variety of safeguards are written into the Democracy Act to prevent abuses by Trustees or the Director which include: Trustees and the Director serve a single term and cannot be re-elected; Trustees can be removed from office in a recall election or if three-fourths of the Trustees vote for removal; Trustees can recall the Director with a supermajority and all Electoral Trust meetings are open to the public.
2. The Electoral Trust would be responsible for establishing procedures and regulations to register eligible citizens for lifetime voter registration, to assist sponsors in preparing initiatives for qualification (drafting), to process initiatives, to distribute information on proposed initiatives to every registered voter via various media outlets, to administer initiative elections and to administer elections and recall elections of the Board of Trustees and the Director. The Director is acting CEO of the Electoral Trust and is responsible for its day-to-day management and operations, consistent with the policies established by the Board of Trustees.
3. Only citizens of the United States who are registered to vote may sponsor an initiative. The sponsor shall be identified on the initiative, on any petition, and on any qualifying poll. Any communication, regardless of the medium through which conveyed, that promotes or opposes an initiative shall conspicuously identify the person(s) responsible for that communication, in a manner specified by the Electoral Trust. Only U.S. citizens may contribute funds, services or property in support of or in opposition to an initiative. Financial disclosures and monetary thresholds will be established by the Electoral Trust. Contributions from corporations including, but not limited to, industry groups, labor unions, political parties, PACs, organized religions and associations are prohibited. Such entities are also prohibited from coercing or inducing employees, clients, customers, members, or any other associated person to support or oppose an initiative. Violations of the prohibitions shall constitute a felony. The initiative itself shall address one subject pertaining to public policy only, but may include related or mutually dependent parts. The initiative shall contain no more than five thousand words.
4. Before being put to a national vote, an initiative would need to qualify in one of 3 ways: a public opinion poll, a petition or legislative resolution. The Electoral Trust in the relevant jurisdictions will determine the number of yeas or signatures needed for qualification by polling and petition. A simple majority in the legislative body of the relevant jurisdiction is all that will be needed for qualification by legislative resolution. The sponsor may withdraw an initiative from further consideration and processing at any time prior to a deadline established by the Electoral Trust.
5. After an initiative qualifies, before it is voted on publicly, multiple hearings on the initiative will be conducted. A public hearing will be held with representatives of the sponsor and representatives of the legislative body of the relevant jurisdiction. Testimony on the initiative will be given by citizens, proponents, opponents, and experts which can be solicited. Their testimony shall be published as the Hearing Record. After the Public Hearing is completed, the Electoral Trust shall convene a Deliberative Committee (much like Oregon's Citizens' Initiative Review) to review the initiative. The Committee shall consist of citizens selected at random from the voter registration rolls of the relevant jurisdiction maintained by the Electoral Trust and balanced as fairly as possible. Committee members are not required to participate (like jurors) and will be compensated for time spent and expenses incurred in performance of their duties should they choose to participate. The Deliberative Committee shall review the Hearing Record, secure expert advice, deliberate the merits of the initiative, and prepare a written report and recommendations. By two-thirds vote, the Committee may alter the initiative, provided that the changes are consistent with its stated purpose.
6. Each initiative, together with its Hearing Record and report of the Deliberative Committee, shall be transmitted to the legislative body of the relevant jurisdiction (local or state) or Congress (federal) for an advisory vote. Upon completion of the Legislative Advisory Vote, or 90 days after the initiative has been delivered to the legislative body, whichever comes first, the Electoral Trust shall publish a schedule for the election of the initiative.
7. The Electoral Trust will take advantage of modern technologies in developing procedures for voting and validating those votes. Voters may use multiple modern technologies from anywhere in the world using the most sophisticated encryption and security protections available that day. The Electoral Trust shall establish and maintain a web site for each qualified initiative that will contain, at a minimum, a summary of the Hearing Record, the report of the Deliberative Committee, the result of the Legislative Advisory Vote, statements prepared by the sponsor, other proponents and opponents, and a balanced analysis of the pros and cons of the initiative, its social, environmental, and economic implications, costs and benefits. Voters can use this information to make informed decisions before they cast their votes.
8. An initiative that modifies the Constitution or a charter would be enacted by affirmative vote of more than half the registered voters of the relevant jurisdiction in each of two successive elections. If such initiative is approved in the first election, the second election shall occur no earlier than six months and no later than a year after the first election. Half of the electorate, not merely half the people who care to vote, must vote yes, twice, in order to change a constitution or a charter.
9. An initiative that enacts, modifies or repeals statute law assumes the force of law when approved by more than half the voters in the relevant jurisdiction participating in an election. This means that in the case of statutes, the majority of the votes received will be counted as the favorable opinion (as opposed to modifying the Constitution, which will require more than 50% of all registered voters).

=== Background ===
The Democracy Foundation and the Philadelphia II Corporation are non-profit organizations established by former United States Senator Mike Gravel (Democratic Party, Alaska, 1969–1981). These organizations were established in conjunction to promote direct democracy through the enactment of a Constitutional amendment and a related Federal statute. If enacted, the amendment would both assert and codify the people's right to make laws, and outline the structure of the Electoral Trust. The "Democracy Act" or federal statute would outline the details with which the constitutional amendment would be implemented.

The Democracy Foundation is the sponsor of the Democracy Amendment and the Democracy Act. It is also responsible for fundraising and educational efforts. The Philadelphia II Corporation was established separately to administer the national vote the organization hopes to use to enact the proposed legislation through the method of 'direct decree by the People'.

Direct decree
The process of direct decree is the legal basis proposed by The Democracy Foundation with which it hopes to sustain its proposed enactments. Direct decree is premised with the fact that 'people's sovereignty' implemented the US political system by direct decree in the United States Constitution. It cites that document's opening clause, "We the people" as evidence of the same premise. By proposed logical extension, having legally created the government of the United States the people may alter it at any time in similar fashion.

The concept of direct decree further posits that although the authority of the United States Congress is limited by the constitution, the authority of the people is inherently sovereign and above the authority of the state. By such a theory any measure voted upon and approved by the popular majority of the people is posited to be legally binding and authoritative over all other law. NI4D does not accept the long-held belief that the two ways spelled out in Article V of the U.S. constitution are the only ways in which the constitution can be amended. The argument for bypassing Article V is that Article V dictates the means which representatives can amend the constitution but does not expressly forbid amendment by the popular vote of the People in its wording. This notion is supported by constitutional scholar Akhil Reed Amar: "...Article V nowhere prevents the People themselves, acting apart from ordinary government, from exercising their legal right to alter or abolish government, via the proper legal procedures. Article V presupposes this background right of the People, and does nothing to interfere with it. It merely specifies how ordinary government can amend the constitution without recurring to the people themselves, the true and sovereign source of all lawful power."

=== Summary of the proposal ===
The National Initiative for Democracy is a proposed Amendment to the US Constitution that recognizes the people's right to make laws, and an accompanying Federal Law that spells out the procedures for the people to develop and vote on laws. This proposed law making is supplemental to those means existing and established through the institutions of representative government (i.e. Congress and the President).

If enacted, the proposed Amendment and the proposed Act, a Federal Statute would become law.

The proposed amendment to the Constitution:

1. asserts the legislative powers of the people to make laws
2. allows the people to amend the constitution by holding two successive elections, more than six months but less than one year apart
3. legitimizes the national election conducted by Philadelphia II, a non-profit IRS 501 C (4) corporation, to enact the Democracy Amendment and the Democracy Act (see below),
4. creates The Electoral Trust to administer the procedures established by the Democracy Amendment and the Democracy Act,
5. outlaws the use of funds not from natural persons in initiative elections under this article, and
6. outlaws non-natural persons from sponsoring initiatives under this article.

The proposed Federal Statute:

1. sets out deliberative procedures to be used by citizens to create laws by initiative,
2. describes the responsibilities of The Electoral Trust to administer these procedures on behalf of the people,
3. appropriates the funds from The Treasury for The Electoral Trust, and
4. defines the threshold of affirmative votes needed to enact this legislation (see below).

This legislation considers itself to be enacted when it has received a number of affirmative votes greater than half the total number of votes cast in the presidential election occurring immediately prior to its certification. The United States Constitution (via Article VII) also self-enacted.

This is neither a government held nor a government sanctioned election. As of this writing, there is currently no official method laid out in the United States Constitution for the people to hold such an election. However, the authority for effecting such a constitutional reform is proposed to derive from:

- the people's sovereignty as the creators of the United States Constitution,
- the First Amendment's right for the people to petition the government for redress, and
- Article VII of the US Constitution.

=== History ===
Although seeking broad public support, the National Initiative for Democracy has been largely spearheaded by the work of Mike Gravel. As well as establishing both The Democracy Foundation and the Philadelphia II corporation, he also authored the bulk of the draft text of the Amendment and Act. Both were vetted publicly at the Democracy Symposium held February 16–18, 2002 in Williamsburg, Virginia.

== In popular culture ==
A proposal for a national initiative is featured as part of the plot in the 1977 film Billy Jack Goes to Washington, the fourth and last of the Billy Jack series. In the film, Billy Jack is appointed a United States Senator. Seeking to keep him out of the Senate on a day when a controversial energy bill is being voted on, another Senator suggests he meet with a grassroots group that day instead. The group is working to pass a national initiative and Billy Jack becomes convinced of their cause. Billy Jack ends up filibustering in the Senate giving a long speech supporting a national initiative.

Mike Gravel and the National Initiative are featured in the documentaries Dear America, directed by Nico Holthaus, and It's Time We Talked.

== Mike Gravel presidential campaign for 2008 ==
The former United States Senator Mike Gravel in 2006 declared his candidacy for the 2008 Democratic nomination for President of the United States motivated primarily by his ardent support for direct democracy and the National Initiative proposal with which he is closely associated.

== Tom Steyer presidential campaign for 2020 ==
Steyer's platform included creating a process for national initiative.
