= Alaska Women's Hall of Fame =

Hall of fame

The Alaska Women's Hall of Fame (AWHF) recognizes women natives or residents of the U.S. state of Alaska for their significant achievements or statewide contributions. It was conceived by the board of directors of the Alaska Women's Network (AWN) in commemoration of the 50th anniversary of Alaska's statehood. The large inaugural class of fifty women were inducted weeks after that anniversary, on March 6, 2009, with subsequent classes inducted every year since. As of the class of 2015, 135 women and one organization, the Sisters of Providence, have been honored. The principal organizations involved with the AWHF are the Zonta Club of Anchorage, the YWCA, Alaska Women for Political Action, the Anchorage Women's Commission, the University of Alaska Anchorage, Alaska Women's Network and the ATHENA Society.

== Inductees ==
Alaska Women's Hall of Fame
| Name | Image | Birth–Death | Year | Area of achievement | Ref(s) |
|---|---|---|---|---|---|
| Vera Alexander | | (1932–2023) | 2024 | Marine sciences | |
| Carol Beery | | (1890–1990) | 2024 | Arts | |
| Tina DeLapp | | (1946–) | 2024 | Healthcare, education | |
| Barbara Doty | | (1955–) | 2024 | Healthcare | |
| Jo Heckman | | (1958–) | 2024 | Banking, education | |
| Janis Johnson | | (1949–) | 2024 | Education | |
| Rhonda McBride | | (1955–) | 2024 | Journalism | |
| Nellie Moore | | (1954–2024) | 2024 | Journalism | |
| Mary Anita Nordale | | (1934–2024) | 2024 | Native right, politics | |
| Vi Waghiyi | | (1959–) | 2024 | Environment | |
| Adelheid Becker | | (1942–) | 2023 | Arts, business, philanthropy | |
| carolyn V. Brown | | (1937–) | 2023 | Healthcare | |
| Victoria D'Amico | | (1956–) | 2023 | Law | |
| Hiroko Harada | | (1954–) | 2023 | Education | |
| Dorothy Isabell | | (1943–1996) | 2023 | Community development, native culture | |
| Ada Johnson | | (1932–2024) | 2023 | Public service, equality | |
| Diane Kaplan | | (1957–) | 2023 | Arts, community development, education, healthcare | |
| Mary Navitsky | | (1947–2015) | 2023 | Arts, education, healthcare, native culture | |
| Esther Petrie | | (1945–) | 2023 | Healthcare, humanities | |
| Libby Riddles | | (1956–) | 2023 | Author, motivational speaker | |
| Martha Rutherford | | (1951–) | 2023 | Public service to Alaska | |
| Barbara Berner | | (1945–) | 2022 | Healthcare, education, community | |
| Pat Branson | | (1948–) | 2022 | Community, senior citizen advocacy. Mayor of Kodiak. | |
| Etheldra Davis | | (1930–2020) | 2022 | Education, community. First African-American teacher, and later, principal, of Anchorage School District. | |
| Shirley Fraser | | (1934–) | 2022 | Healthcare, neurology. Founder of first EEG lab and first sleep lab in Alaska. | |
| Brenda Itta-Lee | | (1943–) | 2022 | Government, native culture, advocacy | |
| DeeDee Ann Stout Jonrowe | | (1953–) | 2022 | Athletics and mushing | |
| Rebecca Parker | | (1950–) | 2022 | Business, philanthropy, community development | |
| Karen Perdue | | (1954–) | 2022 | Government service | |
| Sheila Toomey | | (1940–) | 2022 | Journalist at Anchorage Daily News | |
| Roxy Wright | | (1950–) | 2022 | Athlete and dog musher | |
| Agnes Coyle | | (1939–2020) | 2021 | Alaska native art, philanthropy | |
| Brideen Crawford Milner | | (1921–1997) | 2021 | Philanthropy, banking | |
| Linda Curda | | (1949–) | 2021 | Education, Alaska native arts | |
| Lynn E. Hartz | | (1952–) | 2021 | Nursing, health care policy and programs | |
| Ermalee Hickel | | (1925–2017) | 2021 | Social services. First Lady of Alaska. | |
| Barbara Hood | | (1955–) | 2021 | Public interest and human rights attorney | |
| Lucille Hope | | (1953–) | 2021 | Education, community service. Advocate of children with developmental disabilities. | |
| Margaret Murie | | (1902–2003) | 2021 | Wildlife. conservationist; notably advocated for protection of Arctic National Wildlife Range. | |
| Cindy Roberts | | (1946–) | 2021 | Government service | |
| Mary Ann Warden | | (1942–2020) | 2021 | First Alaska native woman Presbyterian minister | |
| Monica M. Anderson | | (1942–) | 2020 | Chaplain. | |
| Reyne Marie Athanas | | (1951–) | 2020 | Artist and activist in Bethel. | |
| Sarah Eliassen | | (1925–2023) | 2020 | Educator/Girl Scout leader | |
| April S. Ferguson | | | 2020 | Executive VP, general counsel for Bristol Bay Native Corporation | |
| Maragret Norma (Campbell) Goodman | | (1930–2007) | 2020 | Television host; on-air personality at KTVA for 53 years | |
| Ann "Nancy" (Desmond) Gross | | (1931–2001) | 2020 | Community activist in Anchorage. City manager in Akutan, Unalaska. | |
| Karleen (Alstead) Grummett | | (1941–) | 2020 | Author | |
| Jennifer "Jane" Wainwright Mears | | (1880–1953) | 2020 | Founder of the public school system in Anchorage | |
| Peggy Mullen | | (1964–) | 2020 | Environmental activist, Soldotna city council member founder of League of Women Voters and Planned Parenthood local chapters. | |
| Sandy Poulson | | (1940–) | 2020 | Newspaper owner-civic leader | |
| Frances Helaine Rose | | (1937–) | 2020 | University of Alaska regent | |
| Judith “Judi” Anne Slajer | | (1941–2022) | 2020 | First woman manager of the Ketchikan Gateway Borough | |
| Virginia Blanchard | | (1909–1986) | 2019 | Juneau vice mayor; first woman on the city council | |
| Marie Qaqaun Carroll | | (1953– ) | 2019 | Iñupiaq Eskimo from Utqiaġvik, Alaska; Alaska Eskimo Whaling Commission; President and CEO of Arctic Slope Native Association; spearheaded development of a hospital in the North Slope | |
| Heather Flynn | | (1943– ) | 2019 | Anchorage school board member. Director of Alaska Women’s Resource Center and the Abused Women’s Aid in Crisis Shelter, member of the Anchorage Assembly | |
| Abigale Hensley | | (1945– ) | 2019 | Founder of Best Beginnings that provided 2 million free books to Alaska's pre-schoolers | |
| Beverly Hoffman | | (1951–) | 2019 | Yup’ik and European descent, community activist who helped secure funding for the Yukon-Kuskokwim Regional Aquatic Health and Safety Center. | |
| Mary K. Hughes | | (1949–) | 2019 | Anchorage Municipal Attorney, Alaska State Director for US Senator Lisa Murkowski, Association of American Governing Boards of Universities and Colleges, Board of Regents of the University of Alaska | |
| Roxanna Lawer | | (1949–) | 2019 | Board chair and CEO of First National Bank Alaska | |
| Vera Metcalf | | (1951–) | 2019 | Native peoples advocate; Eskimo Walrus Commission executive director; instrumental in the return of ancestral remains from the Smithsonian Institution | |
| Mary Pete | | (1957–2018) | 2019 | President Barack Obama appointee to the U.S. Arctic Research Commission. Developed a bachelor's’ degree program for the Yup’ik language. | |
| Margaret Pugh | | (1946–) | 2019 | Commissioner of Alaska Department of Corrections | |
| Poldine Carlo | | (1920–2018) | 2018 | Author and an elder of the Koyukon subgroup of Athabaskans, native people of Alaska. | |
| Jeanmarie Larson Crumb | | (1945–) | 2018 | Education. President/Executive Director of the Cook Inlet Native Association, forerunner of the Southcentral Foundation | |
| Frederica de Laguna | | (1906–2004) | 2018 | Anthropologist of Native Alaskan cultures. | |
| Mary Laurie Espinosa Epperson | | (1922–2016) | 2018 | Community Arts, Education. | |
| Alice Stevenson Green | | (1917–2020) | 2018 | Advocacy, Education, Religion. Presbyterian leader, social justice advocate. | |
| Lorrie Louise Angelo Horning | | (1942–2020) | 2018 | Community Arts, Community Service. Founder of Alaska Junior Theater in Anchorage | |
| Mary Lou King | | (1929–) | 2018 | Environmental conservation. Protection of Admiralty Island, hike/bike trails around Juneau, President of local Audubon Society. | |
| Margaret Lowe | | (1929–) | 2018 | Advocacy for Children with developmental disabilities, Education, Mental Health | |
| Edna Ahgeak MacLean | | (1944–) | 2018 | Iñupiaq Language | |
| Dorothy G. Page | | (1921–1989) | 2018 | Community Activism, Historic Preservation, Political Activism, Writing | |
| Michelle Ridgway | | (1963–2018) | 2018 | Conservation, Education, Exploration, Marine Ecology | |
| Beatrice Rose | | (1921–2007) | 2018 | Education, Social Justice. Founding member of Anchorage’s first Jewish synagogue. Speech therapist in Anchorage schools for 25 years. | |
| Dixie Johnson Belcher | | (1940–) | 2017 | | |
| Kathryn Brown | | (1950–) | 2017 | | |
| Paula Easley | | (1936–) | 2017 | | |
| Elizabeth Fuller Elsner | | (1923–) | 2017 | | |
| Kay Muriel Townsend Linton | | (1933–2003) | 2017 | Community Organizing, Leadership, Volunteering | |
| Tennys Thornton Bowers Owens | | (1940–) | 2017 | | |
| Elizabeth Parent | | (1941–) | 2017 | | |
| Cathryn Robertson Rasmuson | | (1946–) | 2017 | | |
| Teri Rofkar | | (1956–2016) | 2017 | Tlingit weaver and educator from Sitka, Alaska. | |
| Elsa Saladino Malapit Sargento | | (1946–) | 2017 | | |
| Kathryn Dyakanoff Seller | | (1884–1980) | 2017 | Educator | |
| Carol Swartz | | (1950–) | 2017 | | |
| Annie Aghnaqa (Akeya) Alowa | | (1924–1999) | 2016 | Yupik Alaskan environmental activist, healer, and leader in health and justice advocacy for indigenous peoples. | |
| Kathleen Dalton | | (1925–2019) | 2016 | Community activist | |
| Sandy Harper | | (1940–) | 2016 | Art advocate and cultural entrepreneur | |
| Juanita Lou Helms | | (1941–2009) | 2016 | Mayor of the Fairbanks North Star Borough from 1985 to 1991. | |
| Crystal Brilliant Jenne | | (1884–1968) | 2016 | Member of the Alaska Territorial House of Representatives | |
| Margy K. Johnson | | (1948–) | 2016 | Mayor of Cordova and president of the Alaska State Chamber of Commerce | |
| Eliza Peter Jones | | (1938–) | 2016 | Koyukon Athabascan linguist | |
| Anne P. Lanier | | (1940–2017) | 2016 | Cancer researcher | |
| Janet McCabe | | (1935–) | 2016 | Justice system reformer and preservationist | |
| Jo Michalski | | (1947–) | 2016 | Businesswoman and philanthropist | |
| Alice Petrivelli | | (1929–2015) | 2016 | Advocate for the Aleut people | |
| Shirley Mae Staten | | (1946–) | 2016 | Performer, educator, and cultural activist | |
| Nancy Sydnam | | (1929–2022) | 2016 | Physician, pilot, and dog trainer | |
| Laura Bergt | | (1940–1984) | 2015 | Activist who pushed for the Alaska Native Claims Settlement Act | |
| Daisy Lee (Andersen) Bitter | | (1928–2023) | 2015 | Science educator | |
| L. Arlene "Buddy" Clay | | (1912–2016) | 2015 | Judge | |
| Lucy Evelyn (Huie Hon) Cuddy | | (1889–1982) | 2015 | Anchorage civic leader | |
| Marie (Hanna) Darlin | | (1925–2018) | 2015 | Senior citizens' advocate | |
| Dolly Farnsworth | | (1922–2014) | 2015 | Soldotna community leader | |
| Alice Johnstone | | (1925–2024) | 2015 | Conservationist | |
| Alice Dove (Montgomery) Kull | | (1897–1991) | 2015 | Social worker | |
| Marie (Nick) Meade (Arnaq) | | (1947–) | 2015 | Yup'ik elder | |
| Ramona Gail (McIver) Phillips | | (1944–2021) | 2015 | Alaska House speaker and majority leader | |
| Ruth Anne Marie Schmidt | | (1916–2014) | 2015 | Geologist | |
| Ann Mary (Cherrington) Stevens | | (1929–1978) | 2015 | Community activist | |
| Elvera Voth | | (1923–2024) | 2015 | Choral conductor | |
| Eleanor Andrews | | (1944–) | 2014 | Civic entrepreneur | |
| Jane Ruth Angvik | | (1948–) | 2014 | Former member of the Anchorage Assembly and the Anchorage Charter Commission | |
| Beverly D. Dunham | | (1932–) | 2014 | Journalist and community advocate< | |
| Mary Jane (Evans) Fate | | (1933–2020) | 2014 | Koyukon leader who lobbied for the Alaska Native Land Claims Settlement Act, co-chair of the Alaska Natives Commission | |
| Katie John | | (1915–2013) | 2014 | Ahtna elder and culture bearer who advocated for Native subsistence rights | |
| V. Kay Lahdenpera | | (1936–) | 2014 | Public health nurse | |
| Janie Leask (Gyetm Wilgoosk) | | (1948–) | 2014 | Former president and CEO of the Alaska Federation of Natives | |
| Kay Muriel (Townsend) Linton | | (1933–2003) | 2014 | Organizer and volunteer | |
| Jane Vallett Sutherland Niebergall | | (1931–2024) | 2014 | Rural education advocate | |
| Verna E. Pratt | | (1930–2017) | 2014 | Educator on native flora | |
| Barbara Sweetland Smith | | (1936–2013) | 2014 | Russian scholar | |
| Francine Conat Lastufka Taylor | | (1937–) | 2014 | Advocate and preserver of Alaskan arts, history and culture | |
| Gertrude M. Wolfe | | (1933–2007) | 2014 | Community activist active in health care and education | |
| Arne (Buckley) Beltz | | (1917–2013) | 2013 | Public health nurse. Second wife of Bill Beltz, the first president of the Alaska Senate following statehood. The building housing the Anchorage municipal health department (the original location of what is now Alaska Regional Hospital) is named for her. | |
| Judith "Judy" (King) Brady | | (1941–) | 2013 | Public policy director | |
| Daphne Elizabeth Brown | | (1948–2011) | 2013 | Architect | |
| Carolyn Covington | | (1936–) | 2013 | Educator and advocate for women | |
| Diddy R. M. (Seyd) Hitchins | | (1945–) | 2013 | International relations educator, political science professor at the University of Alaska Anchorage | |
| Karen L. (Lueck) Hunt | | (1938–) | 2013 | Judge and educator | |
| Joan Hurst | | (1927–2003) | 2013 | Youth advocate | |
| Dorothy M. (Knee) Jones | | (1923–2015) | 2013 | Anthropologist | |
| Jewel Jones | | (1943–) | 2013 | Public health and community development leader | |
| Mary Joyce | | (1899–1976) | 2013 | Entrepreneur and adventurer | |
| Thelma (Perse) Langdon | | (1925–2012) | 2013 | Educator, advocate for mental health and elder care | |
| Emily Morgan | | (1878–1960) | 2013 | Public health nurse | |
| Ruth E. Moulton | | (1931–2006) | 2013 | Community activist and educator | |
| Marie (Matsuno) Nash | | (1943–) | 2013 | Human rights advocate | |
| S. Anne Newell | | (1946–) | 2013 | Police officer and detective | |
| Audrey Aanes | | (1944–) | 2012 | Advocate for the physically disabled | |
| Gretchen T. Bersch | | (1944–) | 2012 | Adult education advocate | |
| Connie Boochever | | (1919–1999) | 2012 | Patron of the arts. | |
| Carolyn Floyd | | (1933–2022) | 2012 | First president Kodiak Community College | |
| Wilda G. "Burch" Hudson | | (1924–2012) | 2012 | Anchorage City Council and Municipal Assembly, public service, volunteerism | |
| Carolyn E. Jones | | (1941–) | 2012 | Human rights advocate | |
| Louise Kellogg | | (1903–2001) | 2012 | Dairy farmer, philanthropist (particularly benefiting Alaska Pacific University), Women's Army Corps veteran | |
| Leonie von Meusebach–Zesch | | (1882–1944) | 2012 | Early 20th century dentist. | |
| Ellen Evak Paneok | | (1959–2008) | 2012 | Aviation | |
| Sharon Richards | | (1941–) | 2012 | Community activist in non-profit organizations | |
| Irene Sparks Rowan | | (1941–) | 2012 | Leading advocate and organizer in Alaska Native Claims Settlement Act | |
| Lisa Howell Starr Rudd | | (1933–1985) | 2012 | Alaska House of Representatives, sponsored bill to create Alaska Commission on the Status of Women, was serving as a member of the cabinet of Governor Bill Sheffield at the time of her death | |
| Susan L. Ruddy | | (1941–) | 2012 | Founded the Alaska chapter of the Nature Conservancy | |
| Hannah Paul Solomon | | (1908–2011) | 2012 | Matriarchal elder of the Athabascan people; first female mayor of Fort Yukon. Mother of Jonathan Solomon. | |
| Pauline Utter | | (1942–2005) | 2012 | Women's rights advocate | |
| Rosita Worl | | (1937–) | 2012 | Advocate for Alaska native cultures | |
| Elaine Abraham | | (1929–2016) | 2011 | First registered nurse from the Tlingit people. | |
| Katharine "Kit" Crittenden | | (1921–2010) | 2011 | Urban beautification and historic preservation | |
| Betti Cuddy | | (1924–2010) | 2011 | Member of the family which runs First National Bank Alaska, patron of the arts. Mother of David Cuddy. | |
| Nan Elaine "Lanie" Fleischer | | (1938–) | 2011 | Community activist, was the primary advocate for establishing the Chester Creek trail system in Anchorage | |
| Joerene Savikko Hout | | (1934–2022) | 2011 | From a longstanding Douglas family, influenced by childhood experiences at Tsimshian Indian village, became an advocate for health education and care for native peoples. | |
| Lael Morgan | | (1936–2022) | 2011 | Author, historian, journalist, wrote biographies of Ray Mala and Tundra Times founder Howard Rock | |
| Ruth Elin Hall Ost | | (1886–1953) | 2011 | Ran missions and children's homes; one of the founders of Elim. Grandmother of Gail Phillips, the second (and most recent) female speaker of the Alaska House of Representatives. | |
| Leah Webster Peterson | | (1908–2007) | 2011 | Pioneer educator on Kodiak Island. In 1976, her home in downtown Anchorage became the site (and she became the namesake) of the Peterson Tower, an office/condominium highrise where she continued to reside. | |
| Martha M. Roderick | | (1931–2008) | 2011 | Educator, president of Anchorage School Board. Mother of Libby Roderick. | |
| Clare Swan | | (1931–2025) | 2011 | Advocate for Kenaitze Indian Tribe fishing rights | |
| Helen Stoddard Whaley | | (1924–1971) | 2011 | Children's medicine and care | |
| Caroline Wohlforth | | (1932–2011) | 2011 | Educator, influential in starting public broadcasting in Anchorage. Mother of Charles Wohlforth, who himself has long been associated with Anchorage's public broadcasting outlets. | |
| Patricia B. Wolf | | (1940–2019) | 2011 | Museum director | |
| Alberta Daisy Schenck Adams | | (1928–2009) | 2010 | Civil rights activist of the Iñupiat, whose 1944 challenge of Alaska's segregation policies was a factor in the passage of Alaska's 1945 Anti-Discrimination Bill. | |
| Alice E. Brown | | (1912–1973) | 2010 | Champion of native rights who helped the passage of Alaska Native Claims Settlement Act | |
| Nora Marks Dauenhauer (Keixwnéi) | | (1927–2017) | 2010 | Documentarian of Tlingit culture. Wife of Richard Dauenhauer. | |
| Bettye J. Davis | | (1938–2018) | 2010 | Alaska Senate, Alaska House of Representatives | |
| Hazel P. Heath | | (1909–1998) | 2010 | Founder Pratt Museum, business owner, community activist, Republican Party worker, mayor of Homer | |
| Shirley Holloway | | (1940–) | 2010 | Educator, Quality Schools Initiative | |
| Marlene Johnson (Slath Jaa Klaa Lákooti) | | (1935–) | 2010 | Public service, advocate for the Tlingit people | |
| Georgianna Lincoln | | (1943–) | 2010 | The first Alaska Native female to serve in the Alaska Senate | |
| Ethel Lund (Aan Wugeex’) | | (1931–2022) | 2010 | Founded South East Alaska Regional Health Consortium; Jimmy Carter appointee to the President's Commission on Mental Health | |
| Marge Mullen | | (1920–) | 2010 | Early homesteader on the central Kenai Peninsula, historian and archivist for Kenai Peninsula College | |
| Helen Nienhueser | | (1936–) | 2010 | Environmentalist | |
| Jo Ryman Scott | | (1929–) | 2010 | Educator, founder and until 2009 director of the Fairbanks Summer Arts Festival | |
| Mary Taylor "Tay" Pryor Thomas | | (1927–2014) | 2010 | Journalist, author. Wife of Lowell Thomas, Jr. | |
| Peg Tileston | | (1931–) | 2010 | Conservationist | |
| Elizabeth Ann "Betsy" Tower | | (1926–2010) | 2010 | Public health physician, author, historian. Wrote biographies of William Allen Egan, Michael James Heney and Austin E. Lathrop. | |
| Virginia "Ginny" Hill Wood | | (1917–2013) | 2010 | Conservationist, Alaska Conservation Foundation. Lifetime Achievement Award | |
| Changunak Antisarlook Andrewuk (Sinrock Mary) | | (1870–1948) | 2009 | Of Iñupiaq and Russian ancestry, known as the Queen of the Reindeer, became the owner of the largest reindeer herd in Alaska after challenging Alaska's laws that disqualified women from owning property | |
| Evangeline Atwood | | (1906–1987) | 2009 | Author, historian, president of Alaska Statehood Association. Wife of Robert Atwood and sister of Elmer E. Rasmuson. | |
| Lydia Black | | (1925–2007) | 2009 | Anthropologist | |
| Rita (Pitka) Blumenstein | | (1933–2021) | 2009 | Elder of the Yupik peoples, first state certified practitioner of traditional medicine | |
| Tikasuk "Emily" Brown (Ivanoff) | | (1904–1982) | 2009 | Educator, chronicler of Iñupiaq cultural history | |
| Thelma Buchholdt | | (1934–2007) | 2009 | Alaska House of Representatives, first Filipino American to serve in a U.S. state legislature | |
| Edith Bullock | | (1903–1994) | 2009 | Freighting businesswoman in Nome and Kotzebue, Alaska Territorial House of Representatives, Alaska Territorial Senate | |
| Susan Butcher | | (1954–2006) | 2009 | Multi-year winner Iditarod Trail Sled Dog Race | |
| Ellen "Nellie" Cashman | | (1845–1925) | 2009 | Yukon gold prospector, restaurateur, advocated against violence and against public hangings, caregiver to orphans | |
| Orah Dee Clark | | (1875–1965) | 2009 | Educator, namesake of an Anchorage middle school | |
| Carol Comeau | | (1941–) | 2009 | Superintendent Anchorage School District | |
| Marvel Crosson | | (1904–1929) | 2009 | Aviator | |
| Mahala Ashley Dickerson | | (1912–2007) | 2009 | Pioneering lawyer and civil rights advocate, early homesteader in the Matanuska-Susitna Valley. Mother of Chris Dickerson. | |
| Neva Egan | | (1914–2011) | 2009 | Alaska's first First Lady following statehood. Wife of William Allen Egan and mother of Dennis Egan. | |
| Dana Fabe | | (1951–) | 2009 | The first female associate justice as well as the first female chief justice of the Alaska Supreme Court | |
| Kay Fanning | | (1927–2000) | 2009 | Publisher of the Anchorage Daily News, editor of The Christian Science Monitor.Mother of Ted Field. | |
| Helen Fischer | | (1912–1986) | 2009 | Alaska Constitutional Convention delegate, Alaska Territorial House of Representatives, Alaska House of Representatives | |
| Lucy Frey | | (1932–2020) | 2009 | Educator | |
| Nora Venes Guinn | | (1920–2005) | 2009 | U.S. Commissioner, magistrate and District Court judge in Bethel, the first Alaska Native and first non-lawyer to be appointed to an Alaskan state judgeship | |
| Dorothy Awes Haaland | | (1918–1996) | 2009 | Alaska Constitutional Convention delegate, Alaska Territorial House of Representatives, Alaska Assistant Attorney General | |
| Lorene Harrison | | (1905–2005) | 2009 | Educator, community activist | |
| Cornelia Hatcher | | (1867–1953) | 2009 | Suffragist, temperance advocate. A national-level operative with the Woman's Christian Temperance Union, Cornelia Templeton Jewett visited Alaska in 1909, where she met and married Robert Lee Hatcher, the namesake of Hatcher Pass. Remaining in Alaska, she lobbied the newly formed territorial government for the right of women to vote, which was the first law passed by the territorial legislature, and for passage of the Bone Dry Law, which preceded and outlasted the Eighteenth Amendment to the United States Constitution. | |
| Mildred Robinson Hermann | | (1891–1964) | 2009 | Lawyer, Alaska Constitutional Convention delegate, Alaska Statehood Commission, newspaper and radio correspondent reporting on the territorial legislature. | |
| Frances Howard | | (1944–) | 2009 | First female Alaska State Trooper | |
| Celia Hunter | | (1919–2001) | 2009 | Environmentalist, ecotourism | |
| Katie Hurley | | (1921–2021) | 2009 | Longtime aide to Ernest Gruening, Alaska Constitutional Convention staff, Democratic nominee for lieutenant governor in 1978, Alaska House of Representatives | |
| Sarah Agnes James | | (1946–) | 2009 | Gwich'in environmental activist opposes oil drilling on the Porcupine caribou habitat | |
| Ruth Jefford | | (1914–2007) | 2009 | Aviator, Alaska's first female commercial air taxi operator, first female pilot licensed to teach at Merrill Field | |
| Della Keats | | (1907–1986) | 2009 | Iñupiaq traditional medicine healer | |
| Lena Morrow Lewis | | (1862–1950) | 2009 | Journalist, Socialist Party of America leader | |
| Wilda Marston | | (1930–2022) | 2009 | Educator, philanthropist | |
| Blanche L. McSmith | | (1920–2006) | 2009 | First African American to serve in the Alaska Legislature | |
| Rie Muñoz | | (1921–2015) | 2009 | Bureau of Indian Affairs educator, artist who creates watercolors and prints of life in Alaska. Mother-in-law of Cathy Muñoz. | |
| Lisa Murkowski | | (1957–) | 2009 | Alaska House of Representatives, United States Senate, won reelection to the Senate as a write-in candidate in 2010. Daughter of Frank Murkowski and in-law of Arliss Sturgulewski. | |
| Sadie Neakok | | (1916–2004) | 2009 | Longtime magistrate in Barrow, Iñupiaq Inuit rights advocate | |
| Katherine Nordale | | (1902–1994) | 2009 | Alaska Constitutional Convention delegate, postmaster of Juneau | |
| Sarah Palin | | (1964–) | 2009 | Governor of Alaska, Republican nominee for Vice President of the United States, news commentator, author | |
| Elizabeth Peratrovich | | (1911–1958) | 2009 | Civil rights | |
| Sisters of Providence | | | 2009 | Established hospitals in Nome, Anchorage and Fairbanks | |
| Mary Louise Rasmuson | | (1911–2012) | 2009 | Colonel in the Women's Army Corps; founded Anchorage Museum. Wife of Elmer E. Rasmuson | |
| Irene Ryan | | (1909–1997) | 2009 | Alaska State Senate, Territorial House of Representatives | |
| Grace Berg Schaible | | (1925–2017) | 2009 | First female Alaska Attorney General | |
| Nell Scott | | (1900–) | 2009 | Alaska Territorial House of Representatives, the first female to serve in the territorial legislature | |
| Lidia Selkregg | | (1920–1999) | 2009 | Geologist who was a state planner on land use, Greater Anchorage Area Borough and Anchorage Municipal Assemblies | |
| Natalia Shelikhova | | (1762–1810) | 2009 | First white woman to live in Alaska, cofounder of first government structure on Kodiak Island, helped bring the Russian Orthodox Church to Alaska. Wife of Grigory Shelikhov | |
| Arliss Sturgulewski | | (1927–2022) | 2009 | Alaska State Senate, twice Republican nominee for governor .In-law of Frank Murkowski and Lisa Murkowski. | |
| Dora M. Sweeney | | (1907–2001) | 2009 | Alaska Constitutional Convention delegate, territorial and state legislatures | |
| Fran Ulmer | | (1947–) | 2009 | Mayor of Juneau, Alaska House of Representatives, Lieutenant Governor of Alaska, chancellor of the University of Alaska Anchorage; first female elected to statewide office in Alaska in 1994 | |
| Ada Wien | | (1907–1984) | 2009 | Staff to United States territorial court judge Gudbrand J. Lomen, delegate to Alaska Constitutional Convention. Wife of Noel Wien, whom she assisted in building what became Wien Air Alaska. | |
| Esther Wunnicke | | (1922–2013) | 2009 | Land resources, native land rights, also served in Governor Sheffield's cabinet as commissioner of the Alaska Department of Natural Resources | |
