= Lael Morgan =

American journalist and author

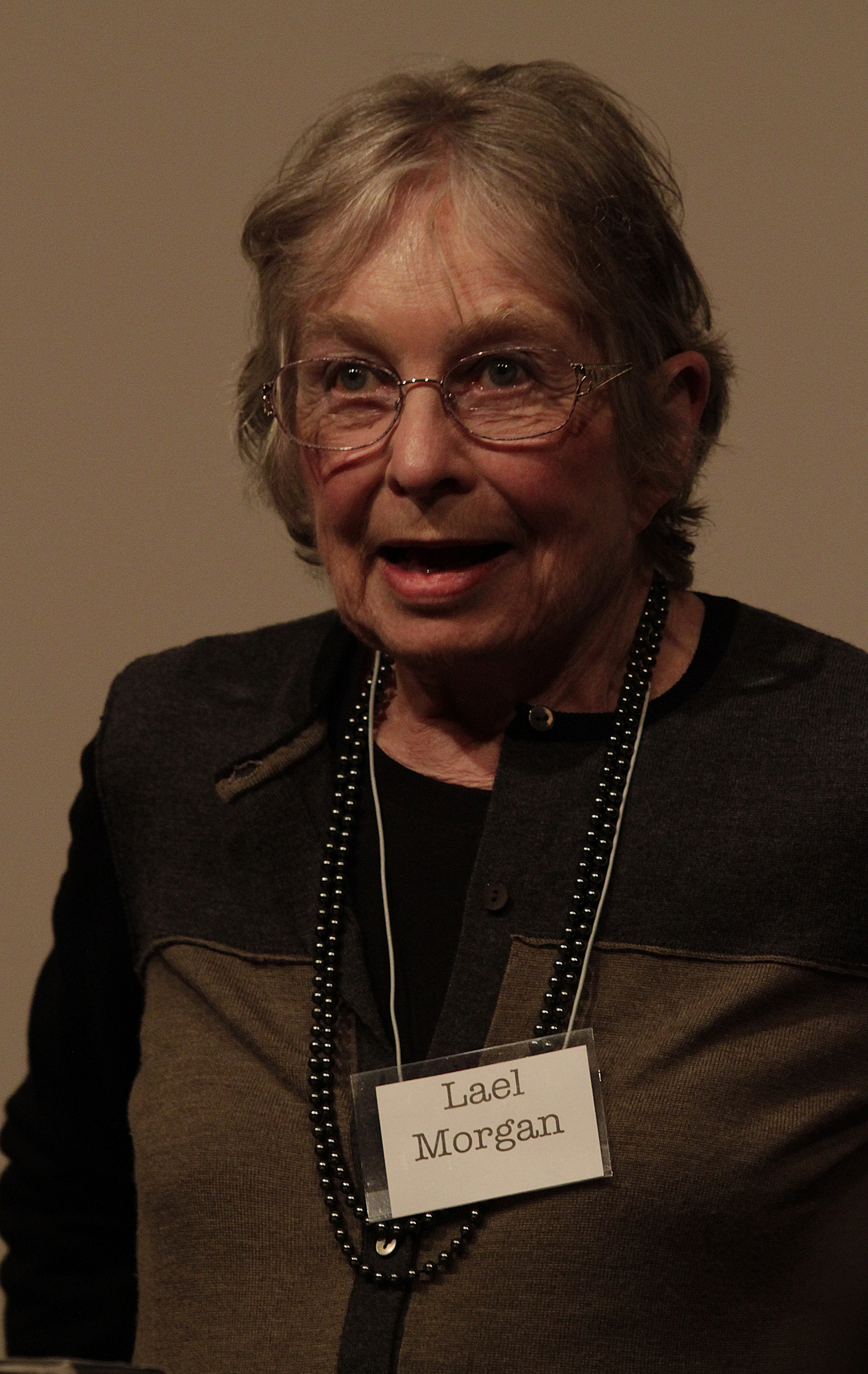
- Morgan in 2014
- Born: May 12, 1936; Rockland, Maine
- Died: July 26, 2022 (aged 86); Anchorage Alaska
- Occupations: journalist, author
- Spouse: Dodge Morgan (m. 1958; div. 1971)

Lael Warren Morgan (May 12, 1936 - July 26, 2022) was an American journalist, author and historian who wrote books about Alaska's history and people.

== Early life ==
Morgan was born in Rockland, Maine, in 1936 to Hazel and Eugene Warren. She attended Emerson College and transferred to Boston University where she graduated cum laude in 1959. She later earned her master's at Boston University School of Communication in 1987.

== Personal life ==
After marrying Dodge Morgan in 1958, she moved to Alaska in 1959. She had a succession of journalism jobs, working as a writer for the Juneau Empire, the News-Miner, Jessen’s Weekly, the Los Angeles Times, National Geographic and the Tundra Times. She worked for Inupiat artist and Tundra Times founder and editor Howard Rock under an Alicia Patterson Fellowship and wrote a book about Rock entitled Art and Eskimo Power.

Morgan worked for the Tundra Times during the land claims movement, writing for the Times as well as doing monthly coverage of Native villages for Alaska Magazine which she did for a decade beginning in the 1970s. She was assigned to visit every Alaska village which was named in the Alaska Native Land Claims Settlement and visited 207 out of 220.

Her book Good Time Girls of the Alaska-Yukon Gold Rush detailing the experiences of sex workers in Alaskan boomtowns of the era, made the Los Angeles Times’ Best Nonfiction list in 1999 and got her named Alaska Historian of the Year. She co-founded Epicenter Press with business partner Kent Sturgis in 1988, a regional publishing house in Fairbanks publishing books about local people and lore. She worked at the University of Alaska in Fairbanks in their Department of Journalism, teaching writing and photography. She moved back to Maine in 1999 and was managing editor and publisher of the Casco Bay Weekly in Portland, Maine.

The Alaska Historical Society named her Historian of the Year in 1998. Morgan was inducted into the Alaska Women's Hall of Fame in 2011 She died in July 2022 in Anchorage and is buried in Fairbanks Birch Hill Cemetery. Her papers, including 69 spiral bound reporter’s notebooks, are held at the University of New England.

== Bibliography ==
- The woman's guide to boating & cooking (Doubleday Books, 1974) ISBN 9780385080729
- And The Land Provides; Alaskan Natives In A Year Of Transition (Anchor Press, 1974) ISBN 9780385000819
- Alaska's Native People (Alaska Geographic Society, 1979) ISBN 9780882401041
- Tatting: A New Look at the Old Art of Making Lace (Doubleday Books, 1977) ISBN 9780385077071
- Earthquake Survival Manual: What to do before, during, and after the "Big One" (Epicenter Press, 1993) ISBN 9780945397205
- Art and Eskimo Power (University of Alaska Press, 2008) ISBN 9781602230217
- Wanton West: Madams, Money, Murder, and the Wild Women of Montana's Frontier (Chicago Review Press, 2011) ISBN 1569763380
- Good Time Girls of the Alaska-Yukon Goldrush (Epicenter Press, 1998) ISBN 0945397763
- Eskimo Star: From the Tundra to Tinseltown: The Ray Mala Story (Epicenter Press, 2011) ISBN 9781935347125
