= Arlene Clay =

American judge (1912–2016)

L. Arlene Clay

Magistrate in the Alaskan Court System
- In office 1960–1977

Personal details
- Born: September 2, 1912 Gardiner, Maine, U.S.
- Died: February 11, 2016 (aged 103) Anchorage, Alaska, U.S.
- Education: New England Conservatory of Music
- Occupation: Symphony performer; air traffic controller; judge
- Nickname: Buddy

L. Arlene “Buddy” Clay (August 2, 1912 – February 11, 2016) was a symphony performer, volunteer plane spotter, air traffic controller and Alaskan judge.

== Biography ==
She was born on August 2, 1912, in Gardiner, Maine, to Charles Gordon Palmer and Annie Mayne. She graduated from the New England Conservatory of Music in 1934. Seven years later, she married music conductor Earl V. Clay. They thereafter moved to Manchester, New Hampshire, where they each performed for different symphony orchestras, with Clay playing the trumpet.

During World War II, they moved to Seattle, Washington, and received training from the Civil Aeronautics Administration to become aircraft communicators and controllers which eventually landed them in Alaska. In 1960, four years after the passing of her husband, Clay became one of the first women magistrates for the Alaska court system. In the same year, Sadie Neakok became the first female to serve in a magisterial capacity. Neither Neakok nor Clay possessed a law degree, though it was not a requirement at the time to serve as a magistrate. She retired from the bench in 1977.

Clay was inducted in the Alaska Women's Hall of Fame in 2015. She died at the age of 103, on February 11, 2016, in Anchorage, Alaska.

== See also ==
- Alaska Women's Hall of Fame
- Courts of Alaska
- List of first women lawyers and judges in Alaska
