= Pleasant Springs =

Pleasant Springs may refer to:

- Pleasant Springs, former name of Rich Gulch, California
- Pleasant Springs, former name of Murray, Kentucky
- Pleasant Springs, former name of Preston, Mississippi
- Pleasant Springs, Wisconsin
