= Senator Bullock =

Senator Bullock may refer to:

- Alexander Bullock (1816–1882), Massachusetts State Senate
- Edith Bullock (1903–1994), Alaska Territorial Senate
- Edward Bullock (1822–1861), Alabama State Senate
- J. Russell Bullock (1815–1899), Rhode Island State Senate
- Marshall Bullock (fl. 2010s), Michigan State Senate
- Wingfield Bullock (died 1821), Kentucky State Senate

== See also ==
- John Bulloch (politician) (born 1947), Georgia State Senate
- William Bellinger Bulloch (1777–1852), U.S. Senator from Georgia
