= Emily Morgan =

Emily Morgan may refer to:

- Emily D. West (c. 1815–1891), also known as Emily Morgan, Texas folk heroine who has come to be identified with the song "The Yellow Rose of Texas"
- Emily Morgan (journalist) (1977–2023), British journalist
- Emily Morgan (nurse) (1878–1960), nurse known as the "Angel of the Yukon"
- Emily Malbone Morgan (1862–1937), social and religious leader in the Episcopal Church in the United States
- Emily Morgan (General Hospital)
