= Katie Hurley =

American politician (1921–2021)

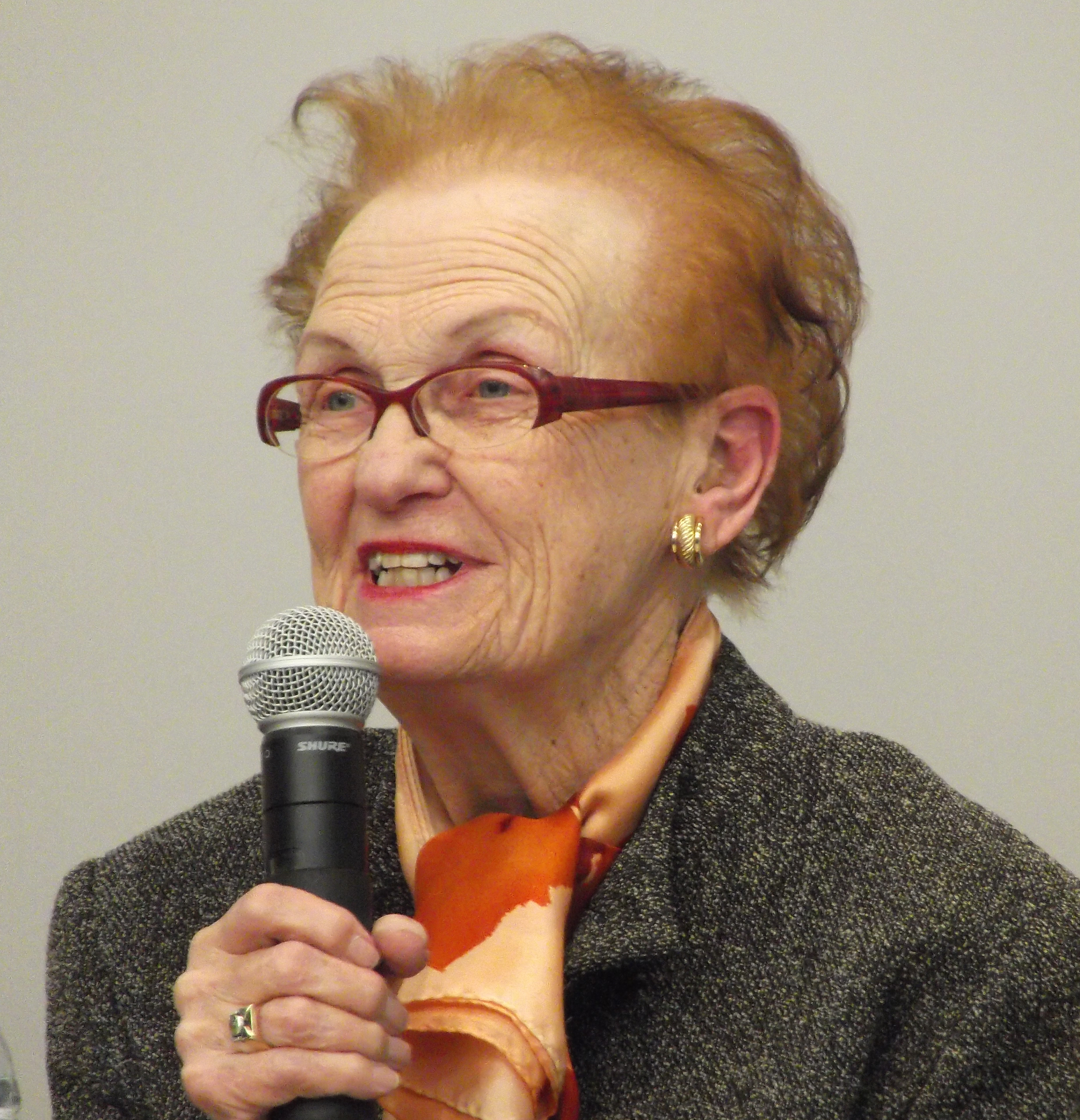
- Katie Hurley speaking at the University of Alaska Fairbanks in March 2013 as part of a panel discussing the history of the Alaska Legislature.

Member of the Alaska House of Representatives from the 16-A district
- In office January 21, 1985 – January 18, 1987
- Preceded by: Barbara Lacher
- Succeeded by: Curtis D. Menard

Personal details
- Born: Olga Katherine Torkelsen; March 30, 1921 Juneau, Alaska
- Died: February 21, 2021 (aged 99) Portland, Oregon, U.S.
- Party: Democratic
- Spouse(s): Joe Alexander (m. 1944), Jim Hurley (m. 1960)
- Children: David Alexander, Susan Alexander Derrera, Mary Hurley Hilowitz
- Education: Behnke-Walker Business College

Olga Katherine Torkelsen Hurley (March 30, 1921 – February 21, 2021) was the secretary to Alaska Territorial Governor Ernest Gruening from 1944 until his departure from office in 1953. She was Chief Clerk to the Alaska Constitutional Convention from 1955 to 1956 and the secretary to the State Senate for five terms. In 1984, she was elected to seat 16-A in the Alaska House, serving until January 1987.

== Early life ==
Hurley was born in Juneau, the daughter of Norwegian immigrants, her father was a fisherman and a carpenter. She attended Juneau High School and she was the salutatorian of her class. She attended Behnke-Walker Business College in Portland, Oregon. She joined the staff of Territorial Governor Ernest Gruening as a stenographer/clerk in 1940, when she was 19. She became a governor's assistant in 1941. She was married in 1944 and then became the executive secretary to the governor that year, even working while she was pregnant, until Gruening's departure from his post in 1953.

== Political and civic life ==
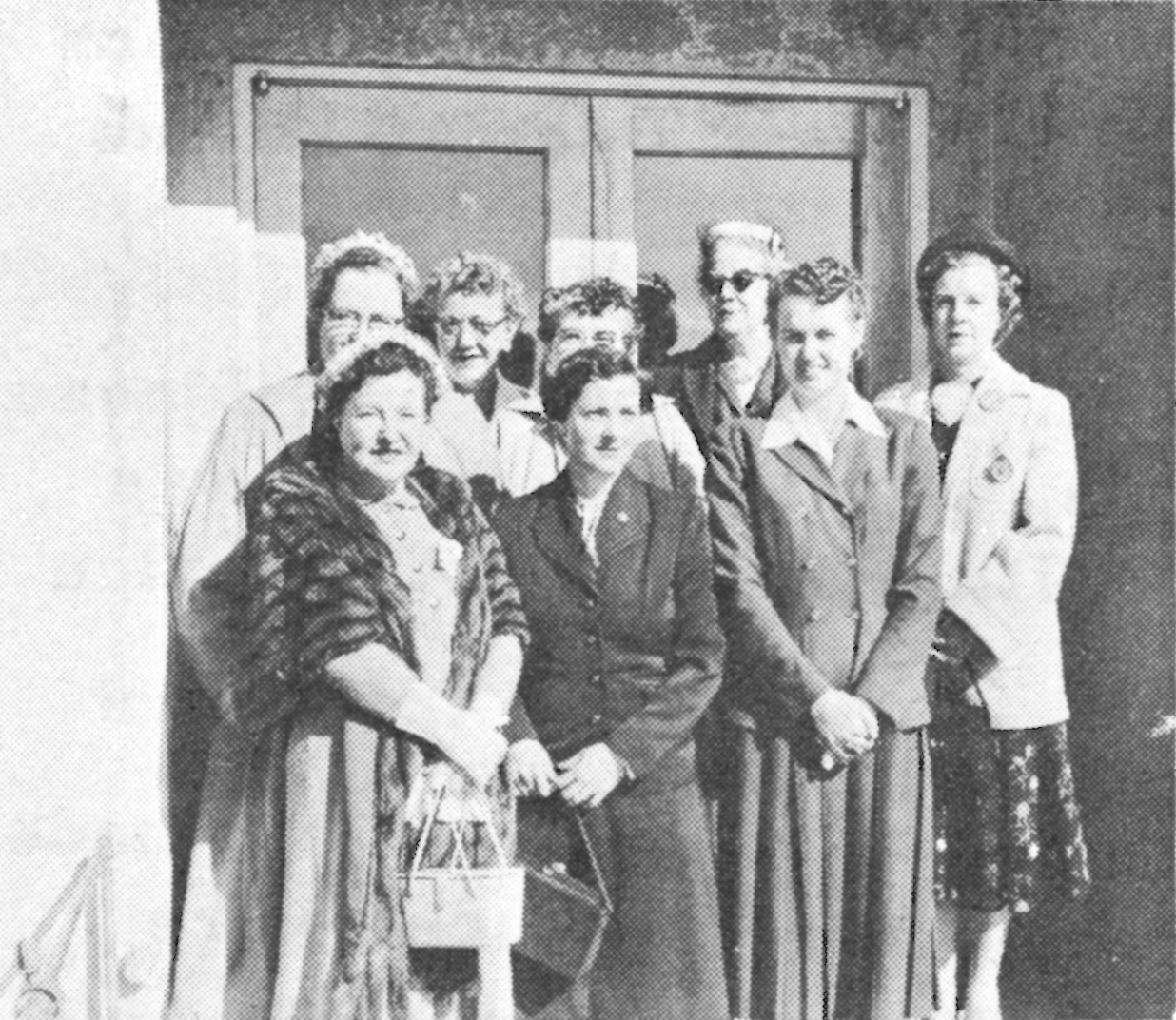
Hurley, then known as Katherine T. Alexander, is seen at right front as part of a greeting party at Juneau Municipal Airport, meeting arriving delegates to the 1956 territorial convention of the Alaska Federation of Women's Clubs. Mildred Hermann, at left rear, was also a member of the welcoming group.

Hurley became the Secretary of the Territorial Senate, then the Chief Clerk to Alaska's Constitutional Convention in 1955–1956. After Alaska became a state, she became the Secretary of the State Senate for five sessions. Hurley served as the president of the State Board of Education for seven years and was the executive director of the Alaska Women's Commission for three years. She was the president of the National Federation of Federal Employees. She was on the Statehood Transitional Staff of Governor William A. Egan in 1959–1960.

Hurley won the Democratic primary for Lieutenant Governor in 1978, the first woman ever to win a statewide election in Alaska, joining the ticket of Democratic gubernatorial candidate, Anchorage attorney Chancy Croft. In 1984, she won Mat-Su valley House seat 16-A, chaired the State Affairs Committee, and, was a member of the House Education Committee. She served on the Alaska Judicial Council. She was elected to the Matanuska Electric Association board. She was the Chair of the Alaska Commission for Human Rights, the state Personnel Board and, for nine years, the Matanuska Telephone Association's board of directors. She lost her state house seat to Republican Curtis Menard in 1986. In 2006, at 85 years old, rather than allow Vic Kohring, a Republican suspected of a felony, to run unopposed, she ran again for the Alaska house but lost, despite Kohring's burgeoning legal problems.

She also was the executive director of the Alaska Commission on the Status of Women and the President of the State Board of Education for seven years. She was inducted into the Alaska Women's Hall of Fame in 2009.

== Personal life ==
Hurley was married to Joe Alexander in 1944; they had two children, David and Susan. In 1960, she married Jim Hurley, a delegate to the Alaska Constitutional Convention and a member of the first state legislature. They had a daughter, Mary. They moved to Palmer in 1960, purchased the office of the Alaska Title Guaranty company and later moved to the shore of Wasilla Lake in 1963. They divorced some time after that.

Katie Hurley was the organist for St. David's Episcopal Church in Wasilla for decades. In 2001, she received the Dot Jones award, named for the first woman mayor of the Mat-Su Borough. In 2009, she was inducted into the Alaska Women's Hall of Fame. She died near family in a private memory care facility in Portland, Oregon where she lived the final years of her life. Her passage left delegate and former Alaska state senator Vic Fischer as the only living participant in the state's Constitutional Convention.

Party political offices
Preceded by H. A. Boucher	Democratic nominee for Lieutenant Governor of Alaska; 1978	Succeeded by Steve McAlpine
