= Leonie von Meusebach–Zesch =

Pioneer female dentist (1882–1944)

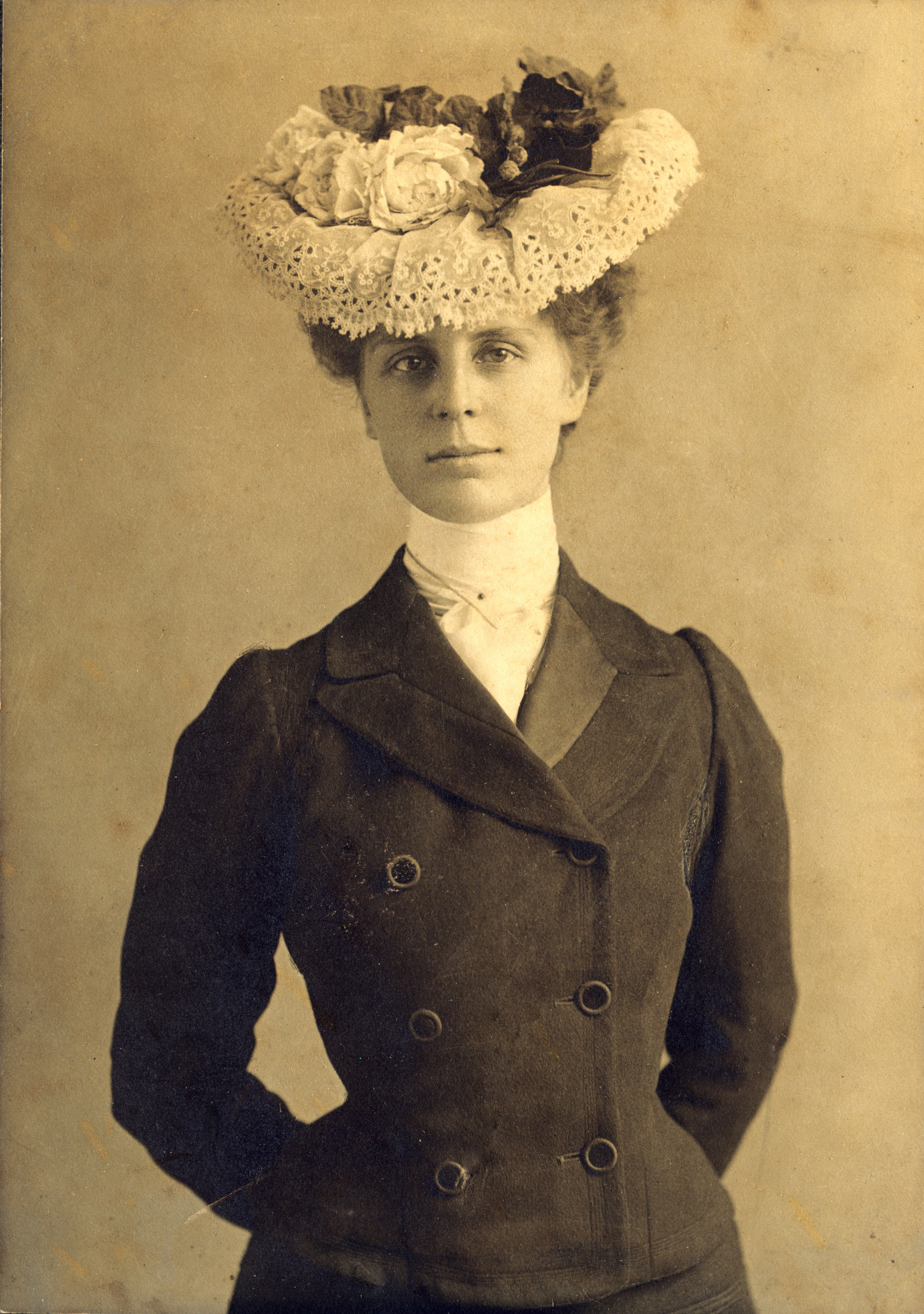
- Born: November 27, 1882; Mason County, Texas, U.S.
- Died: July 7, 1944 (aged 61); Oakland, California, U.S.
- Resting place: Marschall-Meusebach Cemetery; 30°29′0.96″N 98°59′52.08″W
- Education: Arthur A. Dugoni School of Dentistry; Northwestern University; Columbia University
- Known for: Pioneer dentist

Leonie von Meusebach–Zesch (November 27, 1882 – July 7, 1944) was an American early 20th-century pioneer female dentist who practiced in Texas, Alaska, Arizona and California. She is also known as Leonie von Zesch or Leonie Zesch. She was inducted into the Alaska Women's Hall of Fame in 2012.

She was a dental surgeon with the United States Army following the 1906 San Francisco earthquake. Her mother worked with the American Red Cross to document survivors after the disaster. After recovery, she provided onboard dental services to members of both the United States Pacific Fleet and the United States Atlantic Fleet. During the Great Depression, Meusebach–Zesch provided dental care to enrollees and officers with the Civilian Conservation Corps, and later to inmates at the California Institute for Women. For four years, she practiced in her home state of Texas, with an office in Mason. Three years of her dental career were spent in Arizona, where her patients included people from the Hopi and Navajo populations. To accommodate patients who could not travel to her practice in Winslow, Arizona, she hooked her equipment to the back of her Model T automobile and held mobile dental clinics around the state.

For fifteen years, Meusebach–Zesch practiced in the Territory of Alaska, with offices at varying times in Cordova, Nome and Anchorage. To serve remote Inuit villages, she traveled by airplane to islands in the Bering Sea. She survived an airplane crash on her way to Point Barrow and tried to walk to Kotzebue before being transported by an Inuk. Throughout Alaska's interior, she traveled by dog sled to hold mobile dental clinics for both Inuit and non-indigenous patients. She crawled on her abdomen across thin ice to save sled dogs from drowning. She and her assistant were stranded on one occasion, and were rescued by champion dog racer Leonhard Seppala.

== Family background ==
Leonie von Meusebach–Zesch was the elder of two daughters born to Elizabeth and Leo Zesch. She was born November 27, 1882, in Mason County, Texas, and her sister Leota was born in Loyal Valley on June 9, 1886. As a child, Leonie had witnessed the aftermath of a public lynching in Mason, the corpses of the accused hanging from a tree in the town square. Leonie's mother Elizabeth (also referred to as Agnes Elizabeth) was born in Texas in 1862, the fifth of eleven (seven surviving to adulthood) children born to John O. Meusebach and his wife Austrian-born Agnes of Coreth, daughter of Count Ernst of Coreth. John O. Meusebach had been born Baron Otfried Hans von Meusebach in Dillenburg, Duchy of Nassau and renounced his title while he was still on the ship sailing to the United States. Ernst Coreth renounced his title when he became a citizen of the United States.

Elizabeth married Leo Burcheardt Zesch, who had been born in Mason, Texas, in 1859. Thereafter, she used the hyphenated name Elizabeth von Meusebach–Zesch, as did her daughter Leonie. Leo's parents were Robert Zesch (originally Zoesch) and Lina Caroline Dangers (originally D'Angers). Robert Zesch emigrated from Saxony, Germany, in 1854 aboard the ship Ammerland, destined for New Braunfels. In her autobiography published after her death, Leonie refers to Robert Zesch as a former German military officer. The father of Robert Zesch was Carl Zesch, a tax officer in Halle, Saxony-Anhalt, Germany. Caroline Dangers emigrated from Hanover, Germany, also aboard the Ammerland. Robert and Caroline were married on May 17, 1856. Their eight children were named Carl, Leo, Herman, Eugen, Meta, Minna, Martha and William.

== California 1888–1908 ==
In 1888, mother Elizabeth moved to California with her six-year-old daughter Leonie and two-year-old daughter Leota. Their first home in California was Stockton, but they finally settled in San Francisco. Leonie von Meusebach–Zesch completed her basic education through high school in San Francisco, and in 1902 graduated from the Arthur A. Dugoni School of Dentistry, at that time known as the College of Physicians and Surgeons. She became a practicing dentist in June 1902 after passing the California State Dental Board examination and being hired on to work for Swedish immigrant Dr. Matson. Meusebach–Zesch was expected to replace the duties formerly held by Dr. Matson's wife, and her work hours were initially presented as being 8 am – 9 pm. She would find the reality being longer hours and seven days a week, eventually collapsing on the floor from exhaustion. It was during this period she also began to study the correlation of a patient's diet to their dental health.

At 5:12 a.m. on April 18, 1906, San Francisco felt the first foreshock, followed within 20 to 25 seconds later by the 1906 San Francisco earthquake and the resulting fire. The disaster caused 3,000 deaths, destroyed 28,000 buildings and left 225,000 persons without housing. The United States Army under the command of Brigadier General Frederick Funston immediately went into rescue operations when the earthquake hit. Fire chief Dennis T. Sullivan suffered a skull fracture when the dome of the California Hotel fell through the fire department building. He died four days later.

Meusebach–Zesch and her mother evacuated their home after the earthquake and wandered through the streets of the city. She would later describe in vivid detail the chaos, merchant price gouging and human devastation she witnessed. They arrived at the Army station on the Presidio and offered their services. Her mother began working with the combined efforts of the Army and the American Red Cross to document survivors and assist with their needs. Meusebach–Zesch signed on as a Dental Surgeon with the Army, receiving pay for herself, and living quarters to accommodate both herself and her mother. They received word that Leota and her husband were safely on one of the Farallon Islands off the San Francisco coast. On July 1, the rescue and recovery efforts were transferred to the city. The Board of Health replaced Meusebach–Zesch with a male dentist. Brigadier General Funston interceded on her behalf and, with the concurrence of Mayor Eugene Schmitz, she was reinstated.

As San Francisco began to rebuild itself in 1907, Meusebach–Zesch attempted to start a private dental practice of her own. She did not receive many new clients, but she had additional income from appointments as dentist to the Children's Hospital and to the Maria Kipp Orphanage. In 1908, she received agreements from commanders of both the United States Pacific Fleet and the United States Atlantic Fleet to bring dentists and lab technicians aboard ships and provide dental services to the crew members. Although there was ample business, Meusebach–Zesch did not feel the endeavor had been financially profitable for her.

== Texas 1908–1912 ==
Meusebach–Zesch and her mother returned to Mason, Texas, in 1908, where she applied for a license to practice dentistry in the state of Texas. In the duration, she was a person at leisure visiting with friends and relatives in the state. She made a train trip to visit an uncle in Torreón, Mexico. On the train she met a group of Belgians who appeared to be smuggling clothing, jewelry and uncut diamonds across the border. She declined one offer from a Dallas businessman to front a statewide chain of dental offices that he intended to manage in the background. Meusebach–Zesch accepted a position with a dental practice in San Antonio, where she treated members of the city's Maverick family. Anarchists Emma Goldman and Alexander Berkman were friends of the owners and came into town during a visit to San Antonio by President Howard Taft. When she passed her state board examination and became licensed in Texas, Meusebach–Zesch returned to Mason to practice.

In her memoirs, Meusebach–Zesch mentions an election year campaign barbecue when future Texas governors Miriam Ferguson and James E. Ferguson were present. The Fergusons had moved to Temple in 1907, where Jim Ferguson was founder and president of Temple State Bank. Neither Ferguson had yet held political office. In 1910, Jim Ferguson had served as campaign manager for the unsuccessful gubernatorial bid of Robert Vance Davidson. He had also been involved in the gubernatorial campaign of Oscar Branch Colquitt, who was sworn in as Governor of Texas in 1911. In 1912, Meusebach–Zesch approached Governor Colquitt for a state appointment. He required her to submit a petition signed by citizens of the Mason area recommending her for the position. She saw his response as gender-motivated, and decided it was time to move on to visit her sister and brother-in-law in Alaska. On the way, she decided to stop in Winslow, Arizona for a visit with friends.

== Arizona 1912–1915 ==
Meusebach–Zesch kept an office in Winslow once she became licensed by the state of Arizona. She held mobile dental clinics in remote locations, traveling across the state in her Model T touring car, with her equipment and instruments hooked on the back of the vehicle. She treated all school age children free of charge. Many patients journeyed to her Winslow office from other areas. En route with her mother to a sightseeing adventure at Petrified Forest National Monument, she was tracked down by a patient needing immediate treatment. They unpacked her equipment, and she worked on the patient on the open road, before continuing with her sightseeing agenda. After treating Hopi and Navajo patients in Walpi, Meusebach–Zesch and her mother attended a traditional Hopi Snake Dance, a ceremony in which the Hopi believe the snakes carry their pleas for rain to the appropriate deities.

== Alaska 1915–1930 ==
=== Cordova and the interior ===
In December 1915 after living in Winslow for three years, Meusebach–Zesch visited her sister and brother-in-law in the Territory of Alaska, with the intent of returning to her practice in Arizona. The Second Organic Act of 1912 had created the Territory of Alaska out of land the United States had purchased from Russia in 1867. Meusebach–Zesch spent that Christmas with her sister and brother-in-law in Cordova, Alaska. In February 1916, she substituted for vacationing Cordova dentist C. W. Hale. She began to realize that Alaska's need for dentists could be a lucrative career decision.

Meusebach–Zesch wanted to see Alaska's interior while mulling over her professional future. She arranged with the Alaska Commercial Company to carry her as a passenger on its mail delivery. She began aboard a freight train in Cordova. The mode of transportation and drivers changed several times with the weather and circumstances. Through Chitina, Copper Center, Delta, Gulkana, Paxson, Donnelly and McCarthy, she rode by horseback, on wagons, forded through ice at the Tanana River, and was taken through the Salcha River in a native hewn craft. On dog sleds, she was strapped in for stability, and once rolled down a hill when the sled detached. They stopped at numerous roadhouses, which in Alaska served the same purpose as an inn or stagecoach stop in other states. They provided food, shelter and basic necessities. One of the roadhouses was at Richardson, 70 miles southeast of Fairbanks. Named for Wilds P. Richardson, the community had a population of a few hundred people, and the roadhouse was run by Fred Wilkins. Twenty-four days after the trip began in Cordova, they arrived in Fairbanks. After visiting a gold mine near Fairbanks, she completed her trip with a boat ride along the Yukon River and explored the Yukon Territory. At the trip's end, Meusebach–Zesch had decided to move to Alaska.

=== Sabbatical and move to Anchorage ===
She took temporary leave from Alaska to do post-graduate work at Northwestern University in Chicago in 1918, and survived an influenza bout while in San Francisco. The global 1918 flu pandemic killed an estimated 30–50 million. The pandemic spread to Alaska in the fall of 1918, and lasted until the spring of 1919. Hoping to stem the spread, Governor Thomas Riggs, Jr. imposed a maritime quarantine on the territory. The Inuit population was hard hit, partially due to preferring traditional medicines, and partially from fear of western hospitals. In some cases, entire communities were decimated. Dr. Hale in Cordova died as a result of the pandemic, and Meusebach–Zesch purchased his equipment for her office. When copper mining began to decline in Cordova, she moved her practice to Anchorage where she also began to work with the local PTA to improve dental care for children. In 1923, she closed her Anchorage practice to study at Columbia University in New York through the end of 1924. Following her university studies, Meusebach–Zesch vacationed in Europe and Egypt before returning to Alaska.

=== Nome, remote Inuit villages, near-death experiences ===
Meusebach–Zesch's goal in 1925 was to mine for gold in Nome. She had a legal agreement with the existing claims owner to mine his claim in exchange for paying $500 for assessment, and $20,000 in royalties. She hired a Mr. Johnson to do the actual mining for her. No gold was found, and the owner of the claims sued her. She believed Mr. Johnson had been working a scheme with the owner. Her only other means of income was to open a dental practice in Nome.

She began conducting mobile dental clinics as she had in Arizona, and was put in charge of dental care for children in Inuit villages. She had a custom 16-foot sled built and hired Mr. Johnson, of the failed mining venture, as dog musher. She felt his labor would help repay what she lost in the lawsuit. Their route took them through Cape Nome, Solomon, Bluffs, White Mountain School, Moses, Dime Creek, and Candle, each village giving her a welcoming all-night party. Meusebach–Zesch stayed in Kotzebue for a month. At Noorvik they stayed overnight with an Inuit family in a barabara, a semisubterranean sod housing. Kiana was the final clinic. Returning, they witnessed the aurora borealis at Kotzebue, and spent the night at a barabara built inside a snow bank. Half the dog team fell through the ice near Cape Douglas, and Johnson advised leaving them to drown. Meusebach–Zesch crawled flat on her abdomen across the thin ice herself to save the dogs.

Meusebach–Zesch serviced Inuit on Little Diomede Island, Saint Lawrence Island, King Island, Cape Prince of Wales. Chartering a plane to Point Barrow in 1929, she survived a crash and walked partway to Kotzebue before being transported by an Inuk whose water craft was pulled along by his dogs on the beach.

In March 1928, Meusebach–Zesch and her assistant Mrs. Cheney scheduled dental clinics at the White Mountain School for Inuit children, Our Lady of Lourdes Catholic Mission at Pilgrim Hot Springs, and in Council. Because of the lateness of the season and expected break-up of ice and snow, Meusebach–Zesch had trouble finding dogs for the sled, and was unable to hire a man to mush the dogs. She and Mrs. Cheney set off alone with a dog team. Between Cape Nome and Solomon Roadhouse, a blizzard left Meusebach–Zesch snow blind and bedridden for a week. After they completed all scheduled work, they were advised against traveling back to Nome in the inclement conditions. Dire predictions turned to reality when they found themselves stranded, an estimated 30 miles from Nome. The dogs had given up, and they were not even able to make it to the nearest roadhouse. Meusebach–Zesch had begun to believe they might die. Leonhard Seppala, known for winning multiple-year dog sled races, and for participating in the 1925 serum run to Nome, had been alerted about the women's hazardous trek. He hired a caterpillar tractor to search for them, rescuing the women on March 31, 1928.

== California 1930–1944 ==
In 1930, Meusebach–Zesch returned to California. In 1931 she accompanied her mother to Texas for her mother's recuperation from an illness. Leaving her mother in Texas, she returned to Oakland. The Great Depression was in full swing, and she did not feel there would be sufficient new patients who could afford her services. She met Carl Rhodehamel and joined the Unemployed Exchange Association (UXA), offering her dental services on an exchange basis. The UXA was organized July 20, 1932, in Oakland by unemployed electrical engineer Rhodehamel. The concept behind the organization was for the unemployed to help each other through a type of bartering system. Instead of working for money, they worked for points that would be traded for services of other members in the organization. Meusebach–Zesch remained a member of the UXA until at least 1934, commuting to semi-monthly meetings during breaks from her work with the Civilian Conservation Corps.

The state of California instituted a labor program in 1931 to ease unemployment by creating labor camps purposed toward improving and protecting the state's forests and watershed areas. Volunteers received food, shelter and clothing in return for their services. In 1933, President Franklin D. Roosevelt created the Civilian Conservation Corps (CCC) with Executive Order 6106. The CCC employed men ages 17 through 28 creating infrastructure, working with the United States Forest Service to fight fires and plant trees, and creating and improving parks. In California, three million young men of the CCC spent nine years improving the state's environment and creating most of the state's park system. In return, they received $30 a month and an education.

In 1933, Meusebach–Zesch and her mother moved to Railroad Flat in Calaveras County, at the suggestion of her mother's doctor. Meusebach–Zesch worked out an arrangement with the CCC to provide on-site dental services to the young laborers at the Calaveras camps in Rich Gulch and Angel's Camp, as well as Bear River in Amador County. The government paid for emergency services, and the men paid for their own non-emergency services. For the next four years, she performed dental services on an estimated 4,000 young men. During these years, she also serviced unemployment camps and school children. When it became apparent that the CCC would enlist the services of the Dental Reserve Corps, eliminating the need for her services, she appealed directly to Major McCrystal, head of the CCC in San Francisco. She was turned down, based on her gender.

On July 2, 1937, Meusebach–Zesch became dentist for the California Institute for Women at Tehachapi, and operated a private practice in the same city. She provided dentistry to migrant laborers through the Public Works Administration, and to convict labor camps through the California highway department.

== Death ==
Elizabeth von Meusebach–Zesch died in 1943 at age 81. Leonie died in Oakland on July 7, 1944, at age 61. Leota Zesch Gillis died in 1979 at age 93. All three women are buried in a single grave in the Marschall–Meusebach Cemetery in Cherry Spring, Texas. In 2012, Leonie was inducted into the Alaska Women's Hall of Fame.

== See also ==
- Lee McKinley, who practiced dentistry in Alaska from 1947 to 1981, based out of an office in downtown Anchorage. McKinley also devoted much of his practice to serving remote, rural settlements in Alaska, becoming known as "The Flying Dentist" in the process.
