= Esther Wunnicke =

American lawyer (1922–2013)

- Born: Esther Crane; March 15, 1922; Kline, Colorado, US
- Died: March 19, 2013 (aged 91); Anchorage, Alaska, US
- Education: George Washington University (BA, JD); Adams State College (MEd)
- Occupations: Public servant, lawyer
- Known for: Human rights and land rights activism
- Children: 2

Esther Wunnicke (née Crane; March 15, 1922 – March 19, 2013) was an American public servant and lawyer who became known as the "Land Lady" of Alaska for her defense of human rights and land rights.

== Early life and education ==
Esther Crane was born in Kline, CO, and raised in Aztec, NM. After high school, she spent a year going through a business course and worked with the Office of Price Administration during WWII. She then pursued her B.A. in English and Political Science, and a J.D. from George Washington University, where she served as the editor of The George Washington International Law Review. She worked in private practice in New Mexico for a few years, and then went on to obtain her master's degree in education at Adams State College and was an instructor while in the program.

== Career ==
In 1963, she moved to Alaska with her husband, Bill Wunnicke, an engineer at the United States Geological Survey, and their two children. There Wunnicke held the position of Attorney Advisor to the Federal Field Committee 1967–71, later was the Assistant Attorney General, was on the House Finance Committee for the Alaska Legislature, in 1977 she was appointed to the Federal-State Land Planning Commission. The land planning committee was formed shortly after the 1964 earthquake. Wunnicke went on to serve as the head of the Outer Continental Shelf Office of minerals and management services, with her final position within the Department of Natural Resources, where she earned her title "The Land Lady of Alaska".

After officially retiring from her public service office she continued on her work within the Human Rights, the Oil Spill Commission, Pacific Northwest Pollution Prevention Research Center, Beans Cafe and as chair and co-founder of Alaska Common Ground.

In reference to the Alaska Native Claims Settlement Act, after the Federal Planning committee was formed, it became apparent that the Native Claims being filed would need to be resolved. In response to those claims Wunnicke co-Authored the document "Alaska Natives and the Land" along with the staff of the federal field committee, which included Bob Arnold, and Dave Hickock. The purpose of this document was to assist Alaska Congress in understanding the vital role that Alaska Natives held in the State.

== Legacy ==
- South-Central Timber Development, Inc. v. Wunnicke
  - In September 1980 this was brought to the Supreme Court as the state was putting a notice of sale on State owned Timber and was putting a provision within there that if the Timber were to be purchased there was a requirement for In-State processing of the timber.
- Alaska Conservation Foundation
- Alaska Common Ground
  - Upon retirement Esther Co-Founded Alaska Common Ground a public policy group with the following mission: "to collect and disseminate information on Alaska public issues and problems, to facilitate discussion of them, to seek consensus on them, to develop solutions and encourage their adoption and implementation in order to improve Alaskans’ understanding of public policy issues and opportunities with the goal of furthering a just society and sustainable democracy, and for any other purpose for which nonprofit corporations may be organized under Alaska law."

== Awards and honors ==
- Inducted into the Alaska Women's Hall of Fame Class of 2009
- 2014 Honoree Honor Hall Aztec Municipal School District
- Order of the Coif
- National Public Service and Meritorious Service Awards
- Public Administrator of the Year
- Denali Award
- Honorary Degree in Public Policy from University of Alaska

"Esther Wunnicke Women's Issues" (November 20, 1977) [textual record]. Esther Wunnicke, Box: 1, File: 12. University of Alaska Anchorage. "Esther Wunnicke Women's Issues" (12 April 1979) [textual record]. Esther Wunnicke, Box: 1, File: 12. University of Alaska Anchorage.
