= Pat Branson =

American politician (born 1948)

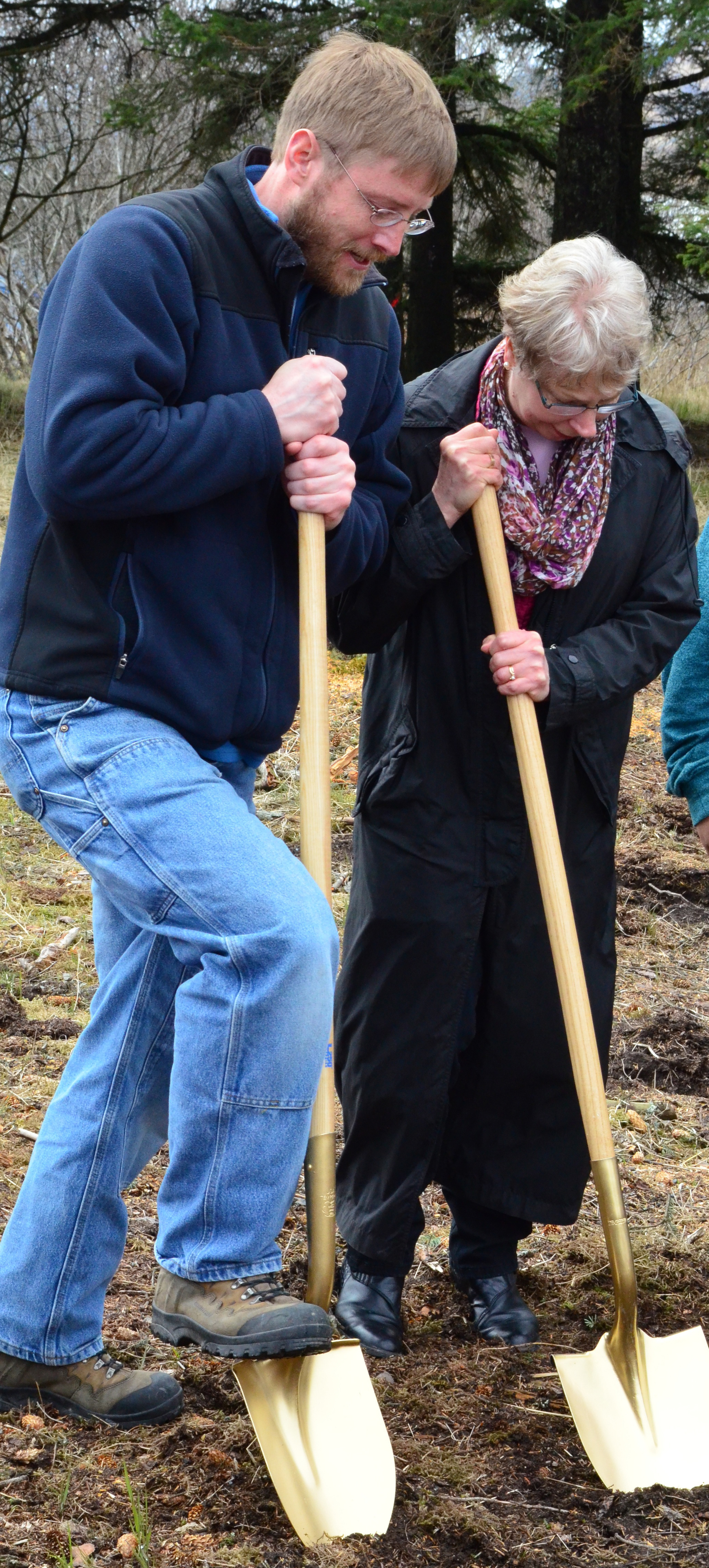
- Branson (right) with Paul Converse

Mayor of Kodiak, Alaska
- In office January 1st, 2011 – October, 2025
- Preceded by: Carolyn Floyd
- Succeeded by: Terry J. Haines

Personal details
- Born: 1948 (age 77–78) Batavia, Illinois, U.S.
- Education: Illinois State University; University of Wisconsin–Madison; Batavia High School
- Occupation: Politician; Mayor
- Known for: Mayor of Kodiak

Patricia B. Branson (born 1948) is an American politician who served as Mayor of Kodiak, Alaska from 2011 to 2025.

== Life and career ==
Patricia B. Branson was born in 1948, in Batavia, Illinois. She then graduated from Batavia High School in 1966. She earned a bachelor's degrees in English and journalism from Illinois State University and a master's degree in communications from the University of Wisconsin–Madison.

In the 1980s, Branson moved to Kodiak. She was the Executive Director of Senior Citizens of Kodiak, Inc. She also served on the Alaska Commission on Aging for many years and co-hosted a public podcast on senior wellness with the commission. She was elected to the council and served 12 years on the Kodiak Island Borough Assembly and a year on the Kodiak City Council. In 2011, She was elected mayor of Kodiak and was succeeded by Terry J. Haines in 2025.

In 2022, she was featured in Alaska Women's Hall of Fame.
