= Lucy Frey =

American educator and activist (1932–2020)

- Born: Lucille Pauline Frey; August 1, 1932; Near Huggins, MO
- Died: January 25, 2020 (aged 87); Buffalo, MO
- Occupation: Educator

Lucy Frey (Lucille Pauline Frey) (August 1, 1932 – January 25, 2020) was an American feminist and gay rights activist and educator. She has been called "a founder of Alaska's lesbian community." In addition, Lucy Frey was a businesswoman and a social studies teacher at Clark Junior High School, where she also developed the curriculum for the students.

== Life and career ==
Frey was born near Huggins, MO, to Albert Frey and Gladys (Maxvill) Frey, and grew up in the area attending Oak Grove, Number One (Ballard) and Long Valley elementary schools. A few days after her 17th birthday, she began her first teaching job at Long Valley — the same one-room school that she had attended earlier. When she completed her bachelor's degree in 1957, from Southwest Missouri State College, she was hired by the Anchorage, Alaska, School District, where she taught and later became social studies coordinator.

In addition, she earned two master's degrees (History and English) and a doctorate in Women's History and was selected for a Fulbright Scholarship to go to India for two months with 20 social studies educators from all over the United States. Frey also contributed to the founding of the Alaska Women's Resource Center, an organization committed to reinforcing local and tribal government responses to abuse and violence against women and children, in addition to the Alaska Women's Political Caucus, an entity found in 1991 that strove to increase the representativity and participation of female activists in politics. After 26 years of teaching, she retired and — along with two other teachers — started a business in Alaska called the Project Learning Tree in Alaska, a widely recognized environmental education program founded in the middle of the 1970s. They traveled around the state and helped school districts develop curriculum and train teachers, and she wrote and published curriculum on Alaska's history and Alaskan Natives. Later, she also co-owned a bookstore for a while, commercially fished for red salmon, and sold real estate.

In 1994, she left Alaska and moved back to Missouri to a home overlooking Pomme de Terre Lake. There, she became involved in real estate again and joined the Missouri Master Gardeners group and the local archeology group, among others.

On March 6, 2009, she was inaugurated into the Alaska Women's Hall of Fame, dedicated to perpetually honor and acknowledge women who have made significant contributions to any area of Alaskan life, for her work as a feminist and educator.

Lucy Frey was also the co-owner of the Alaska Women's Bookstore, which inadvertently served as a communal resource site for women in Anchorage. The bookstore became a resource center for women when it began taking in other feminist organizations throughout the community that were closing, often due to losses in funding.

Lucy Frey also wrote her own work titled "One Woman, One Women's Bookstore: Case Study and Comment on the Place of a Women's Bookstore in a Community" published in 1985, in which she discusses the Women's Bookstore Movement and the significance it has had on women's equality as well as other insight on women's bookstores and what it takes for someone to effectively open one in their own community.
