= Ellen Paneok =

First indigenous Alaskan woman to become a licensed pilot

Ellen Evak Paneok
- Born: Ellen Evak Burgandine; October 17, 1959
- Died: March 2, 2008 (aged 48); Anchorage, Alaska
- Known for: First female pilot of indigenous Alaskan ancestry

Ellen Evak Paneok (October 17, 1959 – March 2, 2008) was the first Alaskan woman of indigenous ancestry to become a licensed pilot. Paneok was a bush pilot, an author and an artist. She was inducted into the Alaska Women's Hall of Fame in 2012.

== Background and early life ==
Ellen Evak was born on October 17, 1959, to Ron Burgandine of the United States Air Force, and his wife Bernice Evak Burgandine, who was of Inupiat ancestry. Accounts vary as to whether Paneok was actually born in Bedford, Virginia, or in Kotzebue, Alaska. The name "Paneok" is a childhood nickname bestowed by her mother and translates into "fish's tail" (paniġuq in Iñupiaq spelling). She later legally changed her surname to Paneok. Her parents divorced, and responsibility for her two sisters fell on her shoulders. Eventually, the children were placed in separate foster homes. Paneok became an emotionally troubled adolescent who at one point was in a juvenile detention center.

== Aviation career ==
Inspired by a magazine article, and enabled by income from the Alaska Native Claims Settlement Act, Paneok pursued her dream of becoming a pilot beginning in 1976. Counselors in her detention center required her to attend therapy sessions because of her admitted total obsession with flying. She often skipped school to attend flying lessons at Merrill Field. In order to continue the lessons, she began creating and selling scrimshaw to visiting tourists in the area. She received her pilot's license in 1979, becoming the first female licensed pilot of indigenous Alaskan ancestry. A year later, she survived the crash of her Piper Tri-Pacer with three cracks in one vertebra. When her blood pressure disqualified her from a career in aerobatics, she became a bush pilot, carrying cargo and passengers to areas other pilots did not go to. She was an operations inspector for the Federal Aviation Administration, and a statewide safety coordinator for the Alaskan Aviation Safety Foundation.

Paneok had her article titled "With Trusting Eyes Behind Me" published in 1996 in Alaska Magazine. In 1997, she was an honored guest at the "Women in Flight" exhibit of the National Air and Space Museum. One of the stories she told at the event was about an airstrip having to be cleared of polar bears before her plane could land.

== Death and legacy ==
Ellen Evak Paneok died on March 2, 2008. On March 7, 2008, Senator Lisa Murkowski paid tribute to Paneok on the floor of the United States Senate. The tribute was read into the Congressional Record.

Paneok was a volunteer with Big Brothers Big Sisters, working with at-risk children. She was a member of the International Organization of Women Pilots, the Alaska Ninety-Nines and the Alaska Airmen's Association.

Her ivory scrimshaw and original paintings are now in museums in Alaska. In 2012, Paneok was inducted into the Alaska Women's Hall of Fame.

The Alaskan Aviation Safety Foundation funds a scholarship in Paneok's name.
