= Audrey Aanes =

American disability rights activist

- Born: August 27, 1944 (age 81); United States
- Education: University of Northern Colorado (B.A., M.A. in Special Education)
- Occupation: Disability rights activist
- Organizations: Access Alaska
- Known for: "Mother of the Independent Living Movement in Alaska"
- Awards: Inducted into the Alaska Women's Hall of Fame (2012)

Audrey Aanes (born 27 August 1944) is an American disability rights activist sometimes referred to as Mother of the Independent Living Movement in Alaska. Aanes received both a Bachelors and Master's in Special Education from the University of Northern Colorado following spending two years in the Peace Corps. Her other career focus was in the physical disability field. She founded the community, Access Alaska, which allows people with physical disabilities to live independently.

The majority of her career was devoted to her advocacy and activism for people with physical disabilities in Alaska, particularly mentally competent adults. Her activism contributed to the development of the numerous Centers for Independent Living, serving the state of Alaska (both rural and downtown). She was inducted into the Alaska Women's Hall of Fame in 2012 for her work in helping disabled persons gain access to independent living in Alaska.

== Early life ==
=== Peace Corps ===
Aanes' work with people with disabilities began in 1965 when she was stationed in Ethiopia as a Peace Corp Volunteers. In 1967, Aanes relocated her work in Turkey.

=== Education ===
Upon arriving back in the US, Aanes went to college at the University of Northern Colorado. After graduating from the University of Northern Colorado in 1969 with a Bachelor's in Special Education, Aanes went on to get her Master's in Special Education from the University of Northern Colorado, finishing in 1969.

== Career ==
=== Alaska ===
Aanes was inducted into the Alaska Women's Hall of Fame in 2012 for her advocacy. Other inductees include Politician and Governor, Sarah Palin, and Iditarod Trail Sled Dog Race Champion, Susan Butcher.

In 1971, she returned to Alaska where she began teaching students with physical disabilities in a classroom setting. Her role in the lives of the physically disabled evolved when she resigned from teaching and became actively involved in advocacy for the standards of living of the physically disabled. Her mission revolved around changing the then existing circumstances for high school graduates with physical disability, who had limited opportunities and were housed in nursing homes with senior citizens with conditions like dementia. She then founded Access Alaska, the first independent living program where her work involved campaigning to ensure the disabled had equal access to resources like housing, transportation, restrooms and restaurants and also opportunities to actively participate in society through respectable jobs and vocational training.

Aanes also championed efforts on the legislative front to grow support for the Independent Living movement by speaking at public hearings, soliciting financial support and highlighting the need for changing related laws. Her efforts were rewarded in 1980, with Access Alaska receiving a state grant to address issues including independent-living-skills training and amenities she would need to facilitate her work. The increasing impact of her work was exemplified in 1982 when 8 young disabled adults moved out of nursing homes into equipped and accessible apartments in Anchorage, downtown Alaska. Furthermore, she extended her efforts with the Independent Living Program to northwest Alaska, by founding Arctic Access in 1993.
