= Dove Kull =

American social worker (1897–1991)

- Born: Alice Montgomery; May 17, 1897; Perry, Oklahoma Territory
- Died: December 8, 1991 (aged 94); Juneau, Alaska
- Other names: Alice Montgomery Kull, Dove M. Kull
- Occupation: social worker
- Years active: 1923-1983

Dove Kull (1897-1991) was a social worker from Oklahoma. After a 37-year career in Oklahoma, serving as second-in-command of the Works Progress Administration and later designing the Oklahoma Department of Public Welfare's adoption policies, Kull moved to Alaska and became the first social worker to administer service to Native Alaskans in the Aleutian Islands. She also secured the funds for the first child care center in Alaska and directed the first home-health service for the elderly in the State. She was posthumously inducted into the Alaska Women's Hall of Fame in 2015.

== Biography ==
Alice Montgomery was born on May 17, 1897 near Perry in the Oklahoma Territory and was raised in Oklahoma. After completion of her secondary education, Montgomery enrolled in the University of Oklahoma (OU), graduating with a Bachelor of Arts in 1922. Between 1922 and 1923, she worked as a newspaper editor of the society and feature pages and then began teaching English at Fairfax High School in 1923. In 1925, Montgomery married Alexander E. Kull, left Fairfax Schools in 1926, and in 1927 obtained a Master's in English from Columbia University.

Kull began a career in social work, working at various state and federal positions. During the Dust Bowl she served as second-in-command of the Oklahoma branch of the federal Works Progress Administration. She was instrumental in developing the state adoption protocols at the Oklahoma Department of Public Welfare, worked at a state mental health hospital, and taught between 1933 and 1935 at Oklahoma City University. In 1940, Kull returned to school, earning her master's degree in Social Work from OU. After her husband's death in 1953, Kull left public service and began working with the Salvation Army in Oklahoma City until 1959.

In 1959, after 37 years of service in Oklahoma, Kull moved to Alaska. She was hired by the Department of Health and Welfare in Anchorage to help in preparation for statehood to plan social services for Alaskan Athabaskans and homesteaders of south central Alaska. Governor Egan sent her to the Pribilof Islands with a directive to help the Native Alakans there transition to federal citizenship. She was the first social worker to attend the needs of peoples living in the Aleutian Islands. In 1961, she transferred from Anchorage to Juneau and was promoted to Child Welfare Supervisor. She secured the federal funds for the first accredited child care facility in the state, which was established in Juneau. She left the service of the State in 1967, moved to Kotzebue and began working with the US Public Health Services Department to provide health services to native Alaskan villages in the bush.

After 2 years, she returned to Juneau and established the first accredited home-health service in Alaska, Alaska Homemaker Services, to help the elder community remain in their homes as long as it was feasible. Kull worked with Homemaker until the mid 1970s and in 1976 was appointed to a state Senior Housing Committee. As part of the committee, she was pivotal in attaining senior housing in Juneau and establishing the Older Alaskan's Commission in 1981, serving three terms on the Commission. In addition, she was part of the Planning Committee of the White House Conference on Aging and a representative to the State committee on Services to the Elderly. Kull retired in 1983 but continued her lobbying for women's rights, children's issues, and native rights.

Kull died on December 8, 1991, in Juneau, Alaska. Posthumously, she was inducted into the Alaska Women's Hall of Fame in 2015.
