= Daisy Lee Bitter =

American science educator (1928–2023)

- Born: Daisy Lee Andersen; January 12, 1928; Fresno County, California, U.S.
- Died: November 2, 2023 (aged 95)
- Education: California State University, Fresno (BA); Alaska Methodist University (MA)
- Occupation: Science educator
- Spouse: Conrad Bitter (m. 1954; died 1999)

Daisy Lee Bitter (January 12, 1928 – November 2, 2023) was an American science educator. She was named to the Alaska Women's Hall of Fame in 2015.

She was born Daisy Lee Andersen in Fresno County, California on January 12, 1928. Bitter was diagnosed with type 1 diabetes at the age of eighteen but chose to tell only her family and close friends. She received a BA from California State University, Fresno in 1948 and began teaching in California. She married Conrad Bitter in 1954 and the couple moved to Alaska. There, she later earned a MA in Education from Alaska Methodist University. Bitter taught at various schools in the Anchorage area, eventually becoming principal. In 1967, she was named Teacher of the Year for the Anchorage School District. She later served as director for the Native Education Program in Alaska. She retired from teaching in 1983. The family then settled in Homer, where she taught teachers on a volunteer basis. Her husband died in 1999. She died on November 2, 2023 at the age of 95.

She served on the advisory board for the Center for Alaskan Coastal Studies and helped establish the Kachemak Heritage Land Trust. She hosted a local weekly radio program "Kachemak Currents" and two television series: Alaska Ecology and First Alaskans. She also served two terms on the Alaska State Curriculum Committee.

Bitter received the Eight Stars of Gold Citizenship Award from the governor of Alaska. In 1983 and 1989, she was honored by the Alaska state legislature for her volunteer activities. She received the Jerry Dixon Award for Excellence in Environmental Education from the Alaska Conservation Foundation in 2011. A chapter about Bitter appeared in the book We Alaskans, published in 2002.
