= List of mayors of Kodiak, Alaska =

The following is a list of mayors of the city of Kodiak, Alaska, United States.

== List ==
- Robert H. Chadwick, c. 1941
- Emil Knudsen, c. 1944
- O.A. Torgerson, c. 1945–1946
- Lee C. Bettinger, c. 1946–1951
- Jack Hinckel, c. 1953
- Leon Johnson, 1954–1957
- Merrill Coon, c. 1957–1960
- Carolyn L. Floyd, 1993–2011
- Pat Branson, 2011–2025
- Terry J. Haines, 2025–present

== See also ==
- Kodiak history
