= Mary Lou King =

American environmental activist, educator and writer

- Born: Mary Lou Neville; 1929 (age 96–97); Oregon, USA
- Education: Northwest Missouri State University (B.A.)
- Occupations: Environmental activist, educator, and writer

Mary Lou King (née Neville; born 1929) is an American environmental activist, educator, and writer.

== Biography ==
Mary Lou Neville was born near Crater Lake National Park in Oregon in 1929. She graduated from Northwest Missouri State University with a bachelor's degree in secondary education, after which she taught in Iowa and Oregon for seven years combined.

In 1958, Neville moved to Juneau, Alaska looking "for an adventure." As a curriculum assistant for the Territory of Alaska Department of Education, she helped teach rural students through a correspondence program. In 1961, she married Jim King, a waterfowl biologist. They had three children.

Mary Lou King has been involved in conservation, education, and public health projects in Alaska for over 50 years. In the 1970s, she campaigned for separate bike paths in Juneau. At this time she also began running the area's "Sea Week" program, taking grade school students on field trips with marine specialists to learn about the local marine environment and maritime industry, history, and culture. Within a decade, the program became mandatory curriculum in Juneau School District's elementary schools, and has since grown into the Alaska Sea and River Week program through the support of the Alaska Sea Grant College Program at the University of Alaska Fairbanks. King also led the campaign to protect public access to Juneau's beaches. She participated in the successful effort to protect Admiralty Island, which resulted in the establishment of Admiralty Island National Monument and the passage of the Alaska National Interest Lands Claims Act.

In 2002, King and her husband donated 1 acre of land near the Mendenhall Wetlands State Game Refuge to the Southeast Alaska Land Trust as a conservation easement. The land around these wetlands slowly rises out of the sea as area glaciers melt, causing the refuge area to shrink as tidelands become uplands. In 1999, the land was rising at a rate of half an inch per year. The easement project, intended as a model for other landowners, had been in the works since 1997.

King served on the board of the Juneau Audubon Society for 40 years before retiring. She helped to identify and photograph two new species for the official Alaska state checklist of birds: the green-backed heron (August 1983, #407) and the scissor-tailed flycatcher (July 2002, #469).

King has written several books and pamphlets about Alaska. Her local Sea Week guides were revised and expanded into the Alaska Seas and Rivers Week Guides.

King has won several awards and honors for her conservation and education work. In 2018, she was inducted into the Alaska Women's Hall of Fame.

== Major awards and honors ==
- Conservation Educator of the Year Award, U.S. Fish and Wildlife Service, United States Department of the Interior, Washington, DC, 1983
- Special Commendation for Valuable Public Service, State of Alaska, Governor Bill Sheffield, 1986
- Conservation Award for Exceptional Service, State of Alaska, Alaska State Museum, Governor Tony Knowles, 1996
- Lifetime Achievement Award, The Alaska Conservation Foundation, 2004
- Great Egret Award, National Audubon Society, 2012
- Inductee, Alaska Women's Hall of Fame, 2018

== Selected books ==
- Birds in Alaska’s south coastal environment: A workbook and Field Guide. With Jim King.
- 90 short walks around Juneau. Discovery Southeast Taku Conservation Society Trail Mix, Inc, 2015.
- Nature detectives on our favorite trails. With E. Ekins. 2011.
