= Beverly D. Dunham =

American journalist

Beverly D. Dunham (born 1932) is an American pioneer journalist and publisher in Alaska. She founded the Seward Phoenix Log in 1966 and served as the editor and publisher, running both the financial side and editorial side of the paper, rare for a woman at the time. In 2014, she was named to the Alaska Women's Hall of Fame.

She is also a community activist and municipal servant in Seward, Alaska. She served on the Seward School Board and Seward City Council, and as mayor for a time.

Dunham was featured in the Ken Burns documentary The National Parks: America's Best Idea, expressing her initial opposition to the Kenai National Wildlife Refuge near Seward. She feared the establishment of the monument would adversely affect the economy of the town.
