= Sinrock Mary =

Inupiaq entrepreneur

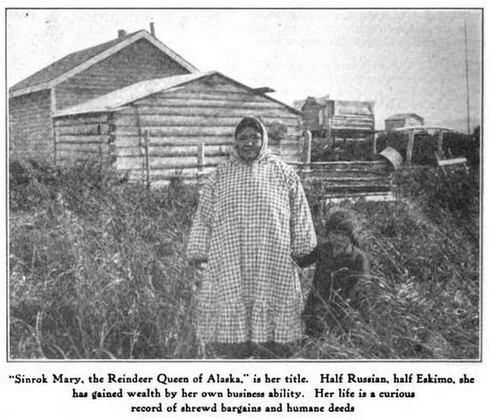
- Sinrock Mary, from a 1918 publication.
- Born: Changunak; 1870
- Died: 1948 (aged 77–78)
- Other names: Sinrock Mary, Mary Makriko

Changunak Antisarlook Andrewuk (also known as Sinrock Mary, Mary Makriko, or the Queen of Reindeer) (1870 - 1948) (Modern Inupiaq spelling: Saŋuyaaq or Chaŋuyaaq) was an Inupiaq businesswoman who became one of the richest women in Alaska due to her work in the reindeer industry.

== Life and work ==
She was born Changunak in 1870. Her mother was Inupiaq and her father was Russian. He worked at the Seward Peninsula as a trader. Mary spoke English, Russian and Inupiaq. She was raised in St. Michael, Alaska. She learned various skills from her mother, including tanning, herbalism, sewing, and Inupiat culture.

She married Inupiaq Charles Antisarlook in 1899. They moved to Cape Nome. She served as a translator for Michael A. Healy. Healy brought the first Siberian reindeer to Alaska to help feed and sustain the Indigenous communities. Antisarlook served as a reindeer herding apprentice and then the couple were given reindeer. Charles Antisarlook died from the measles in 1900. After his death, Mary was not allowed to take over the ownership of "his" property due to her being an Inupiaq and a woman. She ended up being able to keep the reindeer herd, which totaled approximately 500. This led to her becoming one of the richest women in Alaska.

The herd was originally based around Sinuk (Inupiaq: Sinġaq), a small settlement also called "Sinrock", from which Mary took her nickname. For practical reasons Mary moved it south. She sold reindeer meat to the United States Army in the region, which had become busier due to gold being discovered. The gold mining industry caused many problems, including diseases brought by the white miners to the tribe, so Mary relocated to Unalakleet, Alaska, with her family and reindeer in 1901. In 1902, she married Inupiaq Andrew Andrewuk. She adopted children and taught them reindeer herding, and also other members of the tribe. Under her management, the reindeer herd grew to 1,500 at its peak, and ten trainees were adopted. The Sinuk settlement did not prosper, however: it was effectively wiped out by influenza, in 1916.

Mary was also in demand as a linguist and interpreter. She took on these roles in government-supported expeditions, in Alaska, and beyond into Siberia. She was a companion to Sheldon Jackson too, on his travels.

== Death and legacy ==
Mary died in 1948. A documentary titled "The Reindeer Queen: Once the Richest Woman in Alaska – The True Story of Sinrock Mary" was released in 2000. In 2009, Mary was inaugurated into the Alaska Women's Hall of Fame.
