= Juanita Helms =

American politician

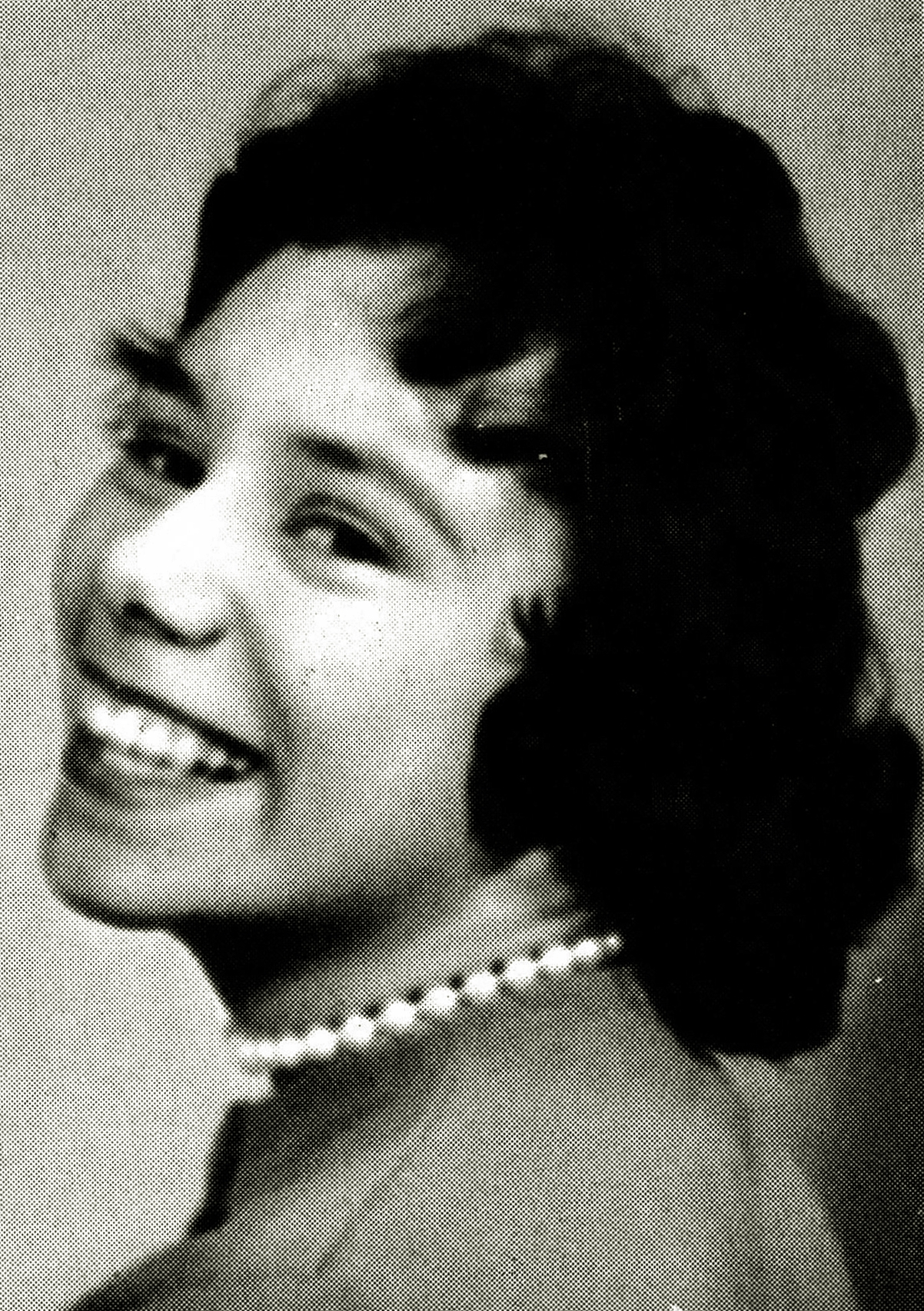
- Helms in her high school yearbook (1959)

Member of the Fairbanks North Star Borough Assembly from Seat H
- In office 1980–1985
- Preceded by: Bill Stringer
- Succeeded by: Lute Cunningham

Mayor of Fairbanks North Star Borough
- In office 1985–1981
- Preceded by: Bill Allen
- Succeeded by: Jim Sampson

Personal details
- Born: Juanita Lou Lauesen; August 3, 1941 Chicago, Illinois, US
- Died: November 7, 2009 (aged 68) Fairbanks, Alaska
- Spouse: Orville R. Helms (m. 1962–2009)
- Children: 4
- Relatives: Harriet Drummond (sister-in-law)

Juanita Lou Helms (née Lauesen; August 3, 1941 - November 7, 2009) was an American politician who served as a member of the Fairbanks North Star Borough Assembly for five years, and then as the first female borough mayor of Fairbanks from 1985 to 1991. During Helms's first term as mayor, she and her administration were criticized for violating borough finance laws with an investment, but was re-elected. Helms worked to establish Fairbanks' ties with the international community through sister city agreements both during and after her tenure as mayor. She was inducted into the Alaska Women's Hall of Fame, and the Juanita Helms Administrative Center in Fairbanks is named after her.

== Personal life ==
Helms was born Juanita Lou Lauesen in Chicago to Ella Boudry Lauesen and Elstun Lauesen, an engineer. She grew up in Michigan, and her family moved to Alaska in 1951 when her father joined United States Army Corps of Engineers. They moved to Fairbanks he received further employment at the Eielson Air Force Base. Helms attended Lathrop High School and after graduation she worked as a court clerk and later an administrative assistance for the University of Alaska, Fairbanks. She married Orville R. "Sam" Helms in 1962, with whom she had four children. She never went to college, and left the workforce in order to look after her children. She volunteered at various community organizations, including the Girl Scouts and the local parent-teacher association, which was where she first became interested in local politics.

She was of Cherokee, Ojibwe and Danish ancestry. Her mother was a member of the Lac du Flambeau Band of Lake Superior Chippewa.

== Political career ==
=== City council ===
Elected in 1980 and re-elected three years later, Helms was a member, and later chair, of the Fairbanks North Star Borough Assembly. She worked there for five years in total. In 1984 she voted for emission standards and mandatory maintenance checks for cars in Fairbanks. In response, a local group attempted to recall her and other assembly members who had voted for the program.

=== Borough mayor of Fairbanks ===
In July 1985, Helms announced her intention to run for the position of borough mayor. Her opponent was the incumbent mayor, Bill Allen. She tied with Allen in five of the electoral precincts, and won outright in the remaining 32. With her election, she became the first woman to serve as borough mayor in Fairbanks. After $670,866 of school bond money was lost in an investment, her administration was investigated and found to have violated the borough's finance laws. Helms's chief financial officer attempted to resign over the incident in June, 1986, but Helms refused to accept her resignation until late July. She was criticized by some local residents for how she handled the incident, saying that she should have withdrawn the investment earlier.

She was re-elected in 1988, winning against Donna Gilbert. During her campaign, her opposition pointed to her handling of the 1986 financial issues, while her supporters focused on cost-cutting measures and other savings her administration had made.

Helms led a delegation to Yakutsk in 1989 as part of a series of attempts to establish friendly ties between the two cities. During the trip, she and the other delegates came across a local protest concerning people being denied entrance into the Red Square. One of her companions, Melissa Chapin, thought that Helms would attempt to join and face arrest, saying "I was afraid [...] I was going to have to call back to Fairbanks and tell them the mayor was in jail." Yakutsk and Fairbanks became sister cities, a move for which Helms was later credited by Mark Begich in front of the United States Senate.

By 1989, Fairbanks had elected a politically conservative city council at odds with Helms, including Donna Gilbert. The assembly limited her veto power and gave themselves more power over the city's finances, while Helms limited her contact with them to written memos and prohibited departmental administrators from attending assembly meetings, accusing the assembly of being unreasonably hostile towards them. In January, 1990, Helms sued the assembly, accusing them of interfering with her office. Gilbert responded, claiming that Helms had taken away the assembly's power and misused her power of veto.

In response to the way the 1990 United States census had been handled in Alaska, Helms and Gilbert appeared in a television commercial together stating that, despite their history, they were willing to come together to encourage Alaskans to be proactive about filling in their census forms.

Helms did not stand for re-election in the 1991 race.

=== Post-mayoral career ===
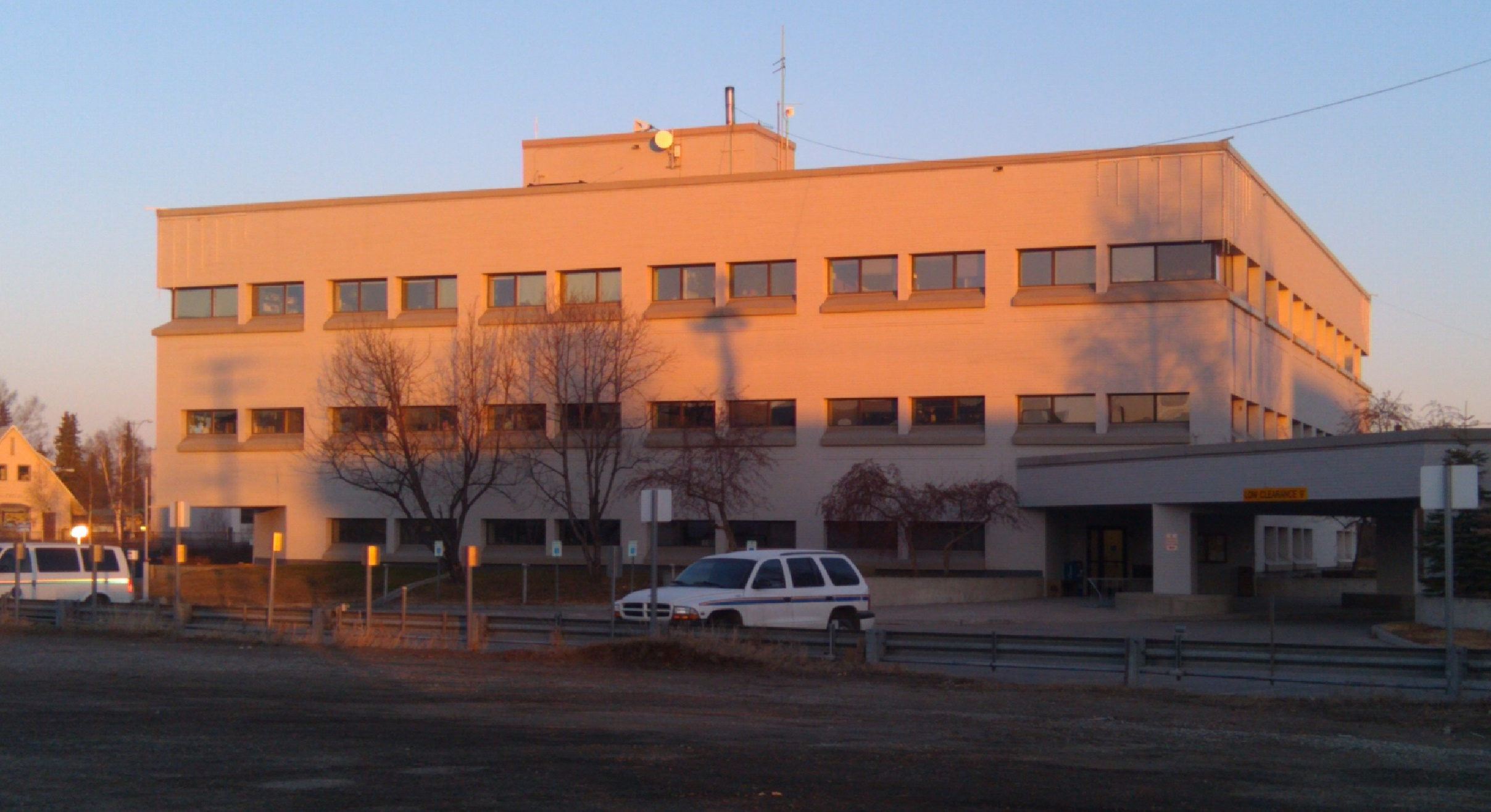
In 2015, the Fairbanks North Star Borough Administrative Center (pictured) was named in honor of Juanita Helms.

In 1992, Helms ran as a Democrat for the Alaska State Senate, but lost to Republican Bert Sharp. She ran for city mayor of Fairbanks in 1998.

As of 1996, she was the chairwoman for the Interior Democrats, and later, in 2001, Helms was the Vice-chair of the Alaska Democratic Party.

== Later life and legacy ==
Helms remained politically and socially active until her death, writing letters to the Fairbanks Daily News-Miner and continuing her volunteer work and involvement in sister city programs. She died on November 7, 2009.

In celebration of the 2010 Arbor Day, schoolchildren planned to plant a commemorative tree for Helms in Wien Park, Fairbanks. Helms was inducted into the Alaska Women's Hall of Fame in 2016, and the Fairbanks North Star Borough administrative center was renamed to the Juanita Helms Administrative Center in her honor.
