= James J. Hurley =

American politician (1915–2002)

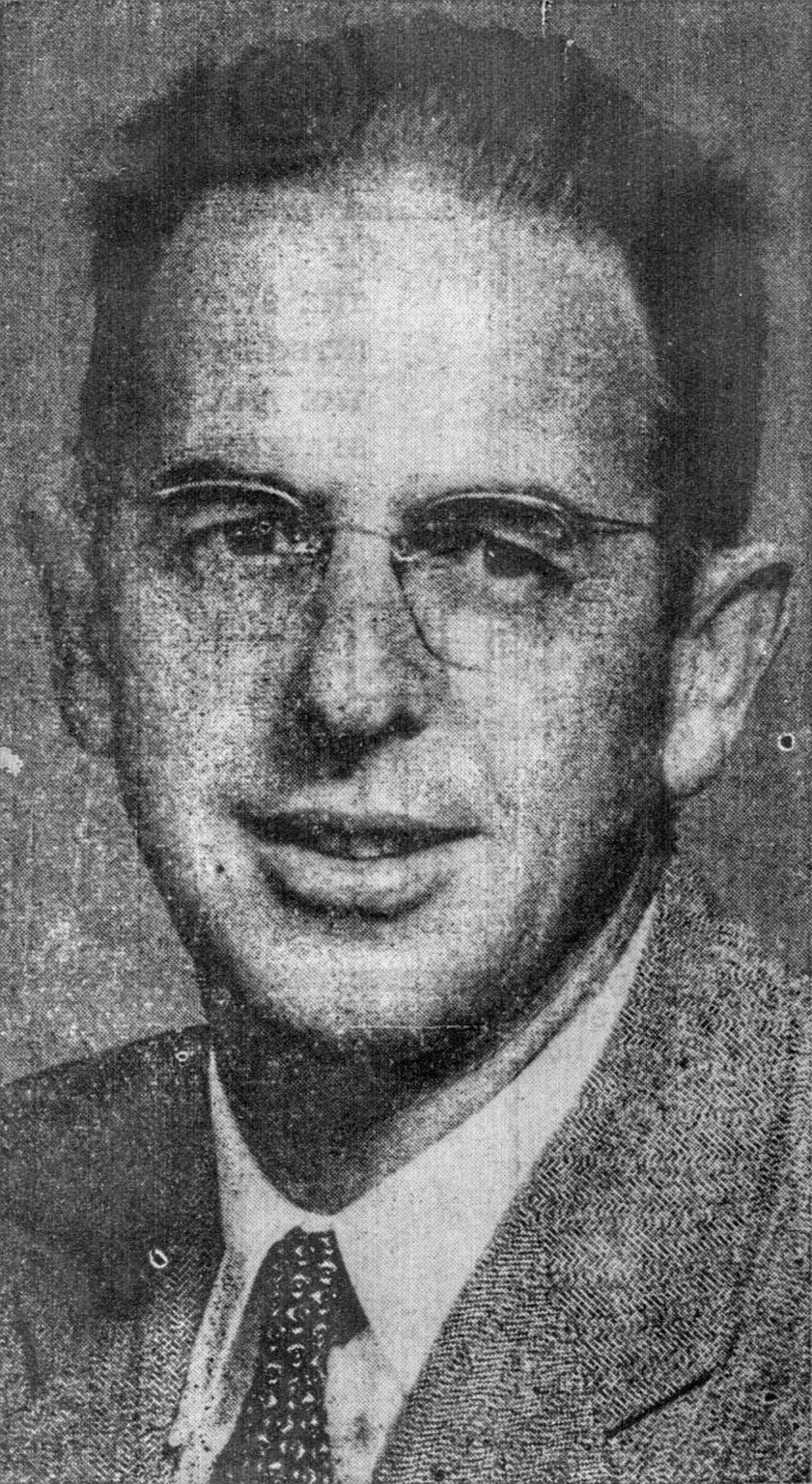

James Julian Hurley (February 3, 1915 – May 30, 2002) was an American businessman and politician.

Hurley was born in Oakland, California and went to San Leandro High School in San Leandro, California. He received his bachelor's degree from University of California in 1948. He served in the United States Navy Reserve. In 1948, he moved to Palmer, Alaska, He worked for the United States Department of Agriculture and was a businessman. Hurley served on the Palmer School Board. He served in the Alaska Constitutional Convention of 1955. He also served in the Alaska House of Representatives in 1958 and was a Democrat. His wife Kate also served in the Alaska Legislature. Hurley died in Hilo, Hawaii.
