= Arne Beltz =

American nurse (1917–2013)

- Born: Arne Louise Buckley; October 27, 1917; Little Falls, New York
- Died: February 1, 2013 (aged 95); Anchorage, Alaska
- Education: Middlebury College; Yale School of Nursing
- Medical career
- Profession: Nursing professor
- Field: Public health nursing
- Institutions: University of Alaska Anchorage
- Research: Public health

Arne Beltz (October 27, 1917 – February 1, 2013) was an American nurse best known for her work in public health. The Arne Beltz Building, which houses the Anchorage, Alaska Department of Health and Human Services, was named in her honor in 1990. In 2013, Beltz was inducted into the Alaska Women's Hall of Fame.

== Early life and education ==
Arne Beltz was born in Little Falls, New York, on October 27, 1917. She was born into a family of healthcare professionals; her father was a physician and her mother was a nurse. Following in her parents' footsteps, Beltz decided she wanted to become a nurse. Beltz graduated in 1934 from Rhinebeck High School. She attended Yale School of Nursing for her master's degree in Nursing after studying Biology during her undergraduate years at Middlebury College. After graduating from Middlebury College in 1938 and receiving her master's from Yale School of Nursing, she finished up her studies at New York University in the Public Health Nursing Program.

== Career ==
Beltz worked in New York City for the Visiting Nurse Service of New York. She served in the Philippines as an army nurse and then she moved to Georgia to work as a public health nurse. While working in Georgia, Arne volunteered to move to Wrangell, Alaska, in 1948 and she worked in many different locations across Alaska including: Kake and Angoon, Fairbanks, Unalakleet and Anchorage. While in Fairbanks, Arne was in charge of the Fairbanks Health Center.

Beltz's job in Alaska included working in areas that suffered from tuberculosis outbreaks and being on call all hours of the day. Many of the diphtheria and typhoid clinics in Anchorage were created by Beltz following the 1964 earthquake. She became the manager of the Community Health Services Division of the Municipality of Anchorage Department of Health and Human Services and was the president from 1973 to 1975. As a manager of Health Services, she helped to create the Child Abuse Board, Home Health Agency, the Family Planning and Women's Health program, and the Women's, Infant's and Children's Nutrition Program. She was a participating member of the American Nurses Association and the Alaskan Nursing Association. She also taught at the University of Alaska.

== Retirement and legacy ==
Following Beltz's career as a nurse, teacher, and leader, Anchorage honored her by naming the building that contains the Municipal Department of Health and Services the "Arne Beltz Building" in 1990. She was also an alumna from Yale University and was one of 90 Yale Nurses to be an "Outstanding Yale Nurses Recipient". She was inducted into the Alaska Women's Commission Hall of Fame in 1991 and was one of few nurses to be nominated to be in the Alaska Nurse's Hall of Fame in 2003. Beltz was also included in the Alaska Nurses Association celebrating 50 years.
