= Ticasuk Brown =

American Iñupiaq educator, poet and writer

Emily Ticasuk Ivanoff Brown
- Born: Emily Ticasuk Ivanoff; 1904; Unalakleet, Territory of Alaska, United States
- Died: 1982 (aged 77–78); Fairbanks, Alaska, United States
- Occupations: Educator; Author; Poet
- Known for: Alaska Native Heritage Preservation

Emily Ticasuk Ivanoff Brown (1904–1982) was an Iñupiaq educator, author, and poet. She was named Woman of the Year by the National Federation of Press Women in 1974. She also received a Presidential Commission and was the first Native American to have a school named after her in Fairbanks, Alaska. In 2009, she was placed in the Alaska Women's Hall of Fame.

== Early life and work ==
Emily Ticasuk Ivanoff Brown was born in 1904 in Unalakleet, Alaska. Her name, Ticasuk, means "where the four winds gather their treasures from all parts of the world...the greatest which is knowledge." Her paternal grandfather was Russian, named Sergei Ivanoff, and her paternal grandmother was Yup'ik, named Chikuk. Her mother’s parents were both Iñupiaq. Brown's parents were Stephen Ivanoff and Malquay. She attended elementary school in Shaktoolik, Alaska, which was a village co-founded by her father. At the age of nine she was taken by the Bureau of Indian Affairs to the Chemawa Indian Boarding School in Salem, Oregon. She remained there for ten years, unable to return to Alaska due to distance. While there she earned her high school diploma and a teaching certificate. She started teaching in Kotzebue, Alaska. She briefly moved to Washington to study nursing and while there married Robert Brown with whom she had three children.

The couple moved back to Alaska where Brown started teaching in villages of Northern Alaska. She returned to college in 1959, obtaining two Bachelor of Arts at the University of Alaska in Fairbanks. She earned her masters in 1974 with a thesis titled Grandfather of Unalakleet. Her thesis was republished as The Roots of Ticasuk: An Eskimo Woman's Family Story, in 1981. It was reprinted in 2024 by Propeller Books with a new foreword about her life written by her granddaughter, Elaine Chukan Brown. Ticasuk Brown created a curriculum around the Inupiaq language and was one of the first educators in Alaska to do so as it was illegal to speak Iñupiaq in Alaska until 1974. The foreword to her book, Tales of Ticasuk: Eskimo Legends & Stories, published by the University of Chicago Press, was written by Professor Jimmy Bedford and provides a comprehensive story of her life and contributions.

== Later life and legacy ==
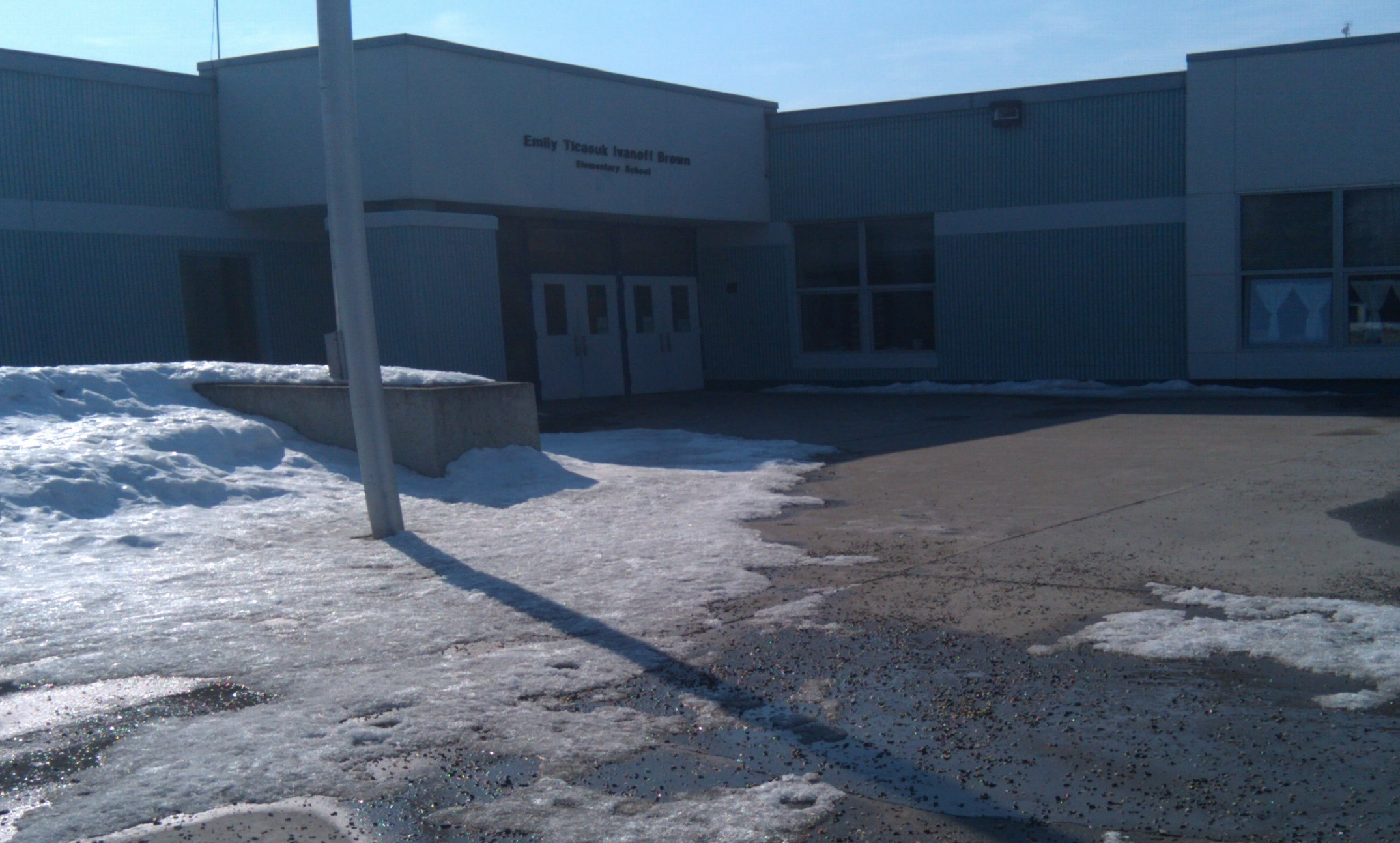
Ticasuk Brown Elementary School in Fairbanks, Alaska

She was given a Presidential Commission by Richard Nixon. She worked at the University of Alaska Fairbanks, where she worked on an Iñupiaq language encyclopedia until she died in 1982 in Fairbanks, Alaska. Just before her death, she was set to receive an honorary doctorate from the University of Alaska Fairbanks. It was awarded to her shortly after she died.

The learning center at the Northwest Community College in Nome, Alaska is dedicated to her. There is an Emily Ivanoff Ticasuk Brown Award for Human Rights award named after her and which is awarded by the National Education Association of Alaska. Ticasuk Brown Elementary School was the first school in Fairbanks, Alaska to be named after a Native American person. The school opened in September 1987. The name was chosen out of 43 submissions in a quest to name the school. She was placed in the Alaska Women's Hall of Fame in 2009.
