= Edith Bullock =

American politician

Edith R. Bullock
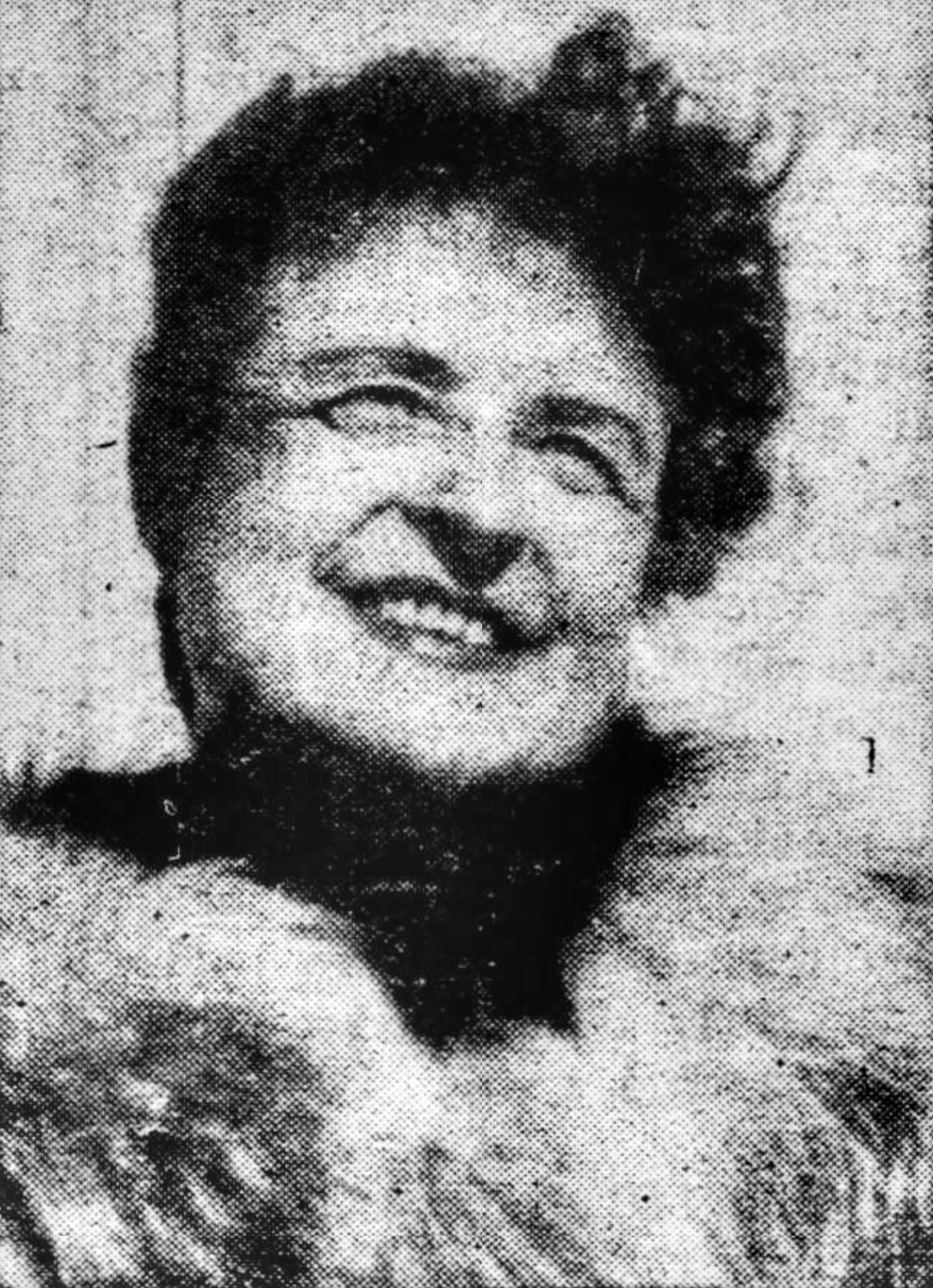
- Born: Edith Rose; April 4, 1903; Red Lodge, Montana
- Died: May 8, 1994 (aged 91); Anchorage, Alaska
- Occupations: Businesswoman; Politician
- Known for: First woman to be named "Alaskan of the Year" and named to the Alaska Chamber of Commerce
- Spouse(s): 1) Details unknown (divorced); 2) John L. Bullock (1940–1966, divorced)

Edith Rose Bullock (April 4, 1903 – May 8, 1994) was an American businesswoman and politician active in Alaska during its territorial and early statehood eras. She was named "Alaskan of the Year" in 1979, making her the first woman to be given the title. Bullock was also the first woman to be named to the Alaska Chamber of Commerce. In 2009, she was named to the inaugural induction class of the Alaska Women's Hall of Fame.

== Early life and work ==
Edith Bullock was born in Red Lodge, Montana and grew up in Everett and Prosser, Washington. She came to the territory of Alaska in 1939, initially settling in Nome. In 1951, she co-founded the B & R Tug and Barge Company in Kotzebue. She would manage, and then be president of, the company. It became the largest firm of its type located north of the Arctic Circle. She served in the Alaska Territorial House of Representatives and the Alaska Territorial Senate, as a Republican. She served the terms of 1953-1956 in the Alaska Territorial House of Representatives and then served in the Alaska Territorial Senate in 1957-1958. She also became the first woman to serve on the Alaska Chamber of Commerce. Bullock received the William A. Egan Outstanding Alaskan award in 1967. From 1967 until 1975, she was on the Board of Regents for the University of Alaska. The following year she was given an honorary doctorate by the University of Alaska. In 1969, she sold B & R Tug and Barge to a Seattle-based company, on whose board of directors she would become a member, and moved to Anchorage. In 1979, she was named "Alaskan of the Year." She was the first woman to be given the title.

== Later life and legacy ==
Artwork collected by Bullock resides in the collection of the Smithsonian Institution. The University of Alaska awards the Edith R. Bullock Prize for Excellence Winner each year. Her papers are held in the collection of the University of Alaska Fairbanks. She was named to the Alaska Women's Hall of Fame in 2009.
