= Courts of Alaska =

Courts of Alaska include:

State courts of Alaska

- Alaska Supreme Court
  - Alaska Court of Appeals
    - Alaska Superior Court (4 districts containing 40 judgeships)
      - Alaska District Court (21 judgeships)

Federal courts located in Alaska

- United States District Court for the District of Alaska

== See also ==
- Judiciary of Alaska
