= Kline, Colorado =

Unincorporated community in La Plata County, CO, USA

- Unincorporated community
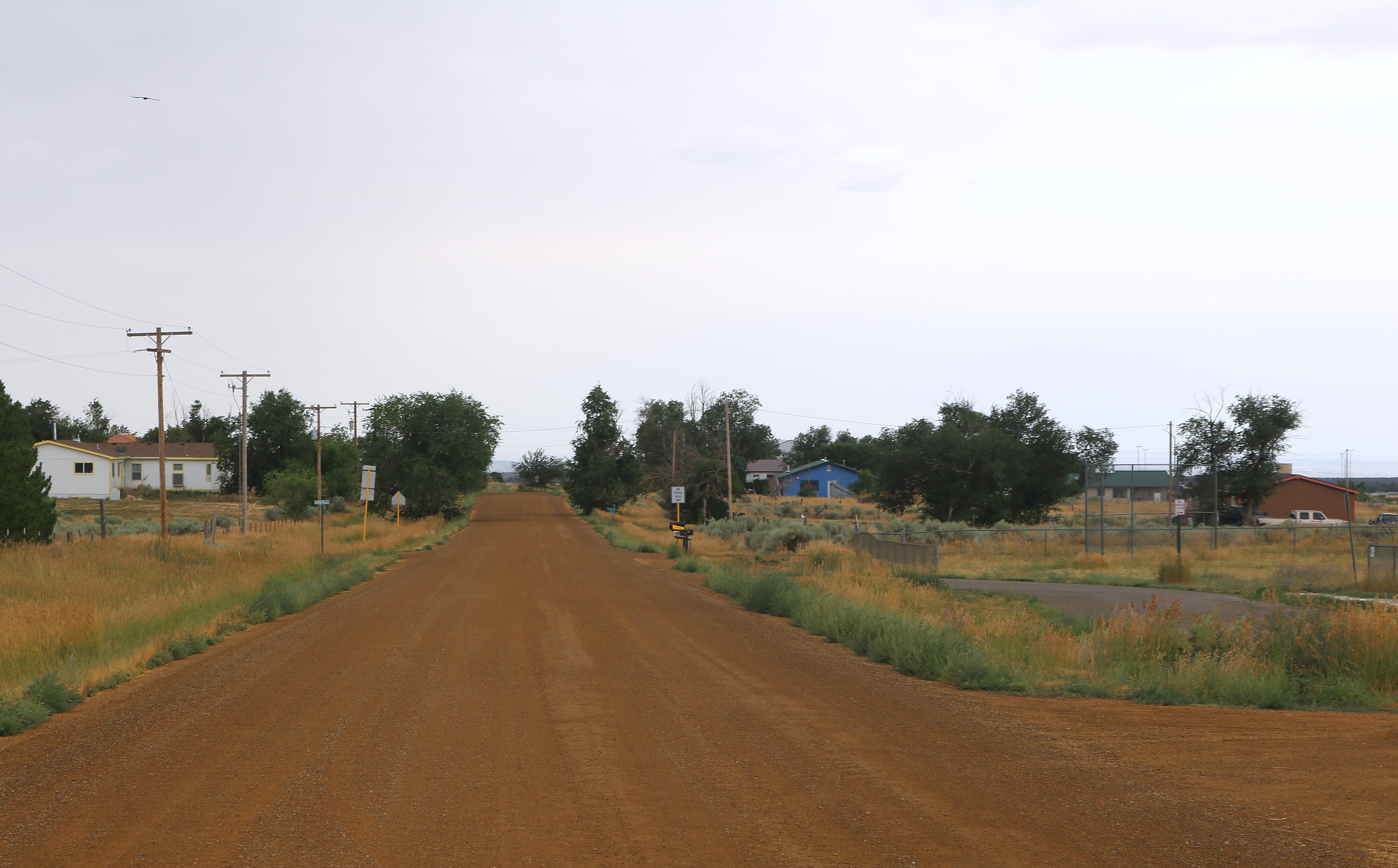
- County Road 122 in Kline

- Location of Kline, Colorado. Kline (Colorado)
- Coordinates: 37°08′39″N 108°07′10″W
- Country: United States
- State: Colorado
- County: La Plata County
- Tribe: Southern Ute Indian Tribe

Government
  - Type: unincorporated community
  - Body: La Plata County
- Elevation: 6,943 ft (2,116 m)
- Time zone: UTC−07:00 (MST)
  - Summer (DST): UTC−06:00 (MDT)
- ZIP code: 81326 (Hesperus)
- Area code: 970
- GNIS pop ID: 179281

Kline is an unincorporated community on the Southern Ute Indian Reservation in La Plata County, Colorado, United States. ZIP code 81326 serves Kline, but mail must be addressed to the community of Hesperus.

== History ==
The Southern Ute Indian Reservation was created on November 9, 1878. The Kline, Colorado, post office operated from April 22, 1904, until March 31, 1953.

== See also ==
- Durango, CO Micropolitan Statistical Area
- Southern Ute Indian Reservation
