= Crystal Snow Jenne =

American politician

Crystal Brilliant Snow Jenne was the first woman to run for the Alaska Territorial House of Representatives in the Alaska Territory.

== Biography ==
Crystal Brilliant Snow Jenne was born in Sonora, California on May 30, 1884.

In 1887, she migrated to the Alaska Territory with her parents, who worked as a troupe of actors to entertain the miners. As her father joined the Klondike Gold Rush, they moved to Circle City where her father built an opera house. After he found gold, they moved to Seattle, but they lost their money and returned to Alaska.

After graduating from the University of California at Berkeley where she majored in Music, she taught in Paso Robles, California. From 1907 to 1908, she taught in Douglas, Alaska. She spent the next summer singing for miners in Skagway, Haines, Dawson, Fairbanks, Nome, etc. She then attended the Spencerian Commercial School in Cleveland, Ohio to study Business. She then taught in Skagway, Sitka, and the Mendenhall Valley.

She moved back to Juneau in 1914. She was married in 1916 and had three children. Her husband died in 1938. The next year, she published a volume of historical poetry. Meanwhile, she worked in church choirs, taught, and ran a flower shop. In 1934, she ran as a Democrat for the Alaska Territorial House of Representatives. She lost four races, and was elected in 1940, and reelected in 1942.

She was a member of the Alaska Federation of Women's Clubs, the Democratic Women's Club, the Juneau Women's Club, and the National Business and Professional Women's Club.

She died at the Sitka Pioneer Home on June 5, 1968.

== Bibliography ==
- The Ghost of Old Juneau (1939)
