= Mildred Hermann =

American lawyer (1891–1964)

- Born: Mildred Robinson; February 28, 1891; Brookfield, Indiana, U.S.
- Died: March 16, 1964 (aged 73); Juneau, Alaska, U.S.
- Occupation: Lawyer

Mildred Robinson Hermann (February 28, 1891 – March 16, 1964) was an American lawyer. She was the first woman lawyer in Juneau, Alaska. Hermann has been called the "Queen Mother of the Alaskan Statehood," due to her leadership in Alaska becoming a state. She was a signer of the Alaska State Constitution. In 2009, she was named to the Alaska Women's Hall of Fame.

== Early life and education ==
Mildred Robinson was born in 1891 in Indiana. She moved to Alaska in 1919.

== Work ==
Hermann would testify on Capitol Hill on behalf of Alaska Statehood in 1950.

== Later life and legacy ==
She died in Juneau in 1964. In 2009, she was named to the Alaska Women's Hall of Fame.
