= Kodiak College =

Public two-year college in Kodiak, Alaska, US

Coordinates: 57°48′25″N 152°21′49″W

- Type: Public; Satellite campus
- Established: 1968; 58 years ago
- Parent institution: University of Alaska Anchorage
- Students: 1,000
- Website: www.koc.alaska.edu

Kodiak College is a public, two-year college in Kodiak, Alaska, that is a satellite campus of the University of Alaska Anchorage. It has a student body of approximately 1,000 and is also home to the Carolyn Floyd Library.

== History ==
Kodiak College opened in 1968. There were only eight courses available with a total of 95 students enrolled in the college's first year, and all courses were personally taught by Carolyn Floyd. In 1972, Kodiak had completed its first building that was dedicated to classrooms allowing for the college's first departure from the High School campus onto its own. In 1987, Kodiak College changed its previous designation as a community college to be absorbed by and become an extension to the University of Alaska Anchorage.

The campus sits on 50 acres (20 ha) approximately 2 miles (3.2 km) from the city of Kodiak. During the winter semester of 2014, there were 915 students enrolled and approximately 100 courses were offered each semester. The college employs approximately 50 faculty members each semester. Kodiak College's only bachelor's degree is in education but there are multiple associate degree options.

== Academics ==
=== Two-Year Degrees ===
- Associate of Arts, General Program (AA)
- Accounting (AAS)
- Computer Information & Office System (AAS)
- Computer Systems Technology (AAS)
- Early Childhood Education (AAS)
- General Business (AAS)
- Nursing (AAS)
- Technology [applied/vocational] (AAS)

=== Certificates ===
==== Computer Information and Office Systems ====
- Office Foundations
- Office Support
- Bookkeeping Support
- Medical Office Support
- Office Digital Media
- Technical Support

==== Other Certificates ====
- Health Care Assistant
