= Carolyn Floyd =

American educator and politician

Carolyn Floyd (1933 – 18 January 2022) was an American educator and politician. She served as the first president of the Kodiak College in the U.S. state of Alaska, and was the mayor of Kodiak for 18 consecutive years. She was inducted into the Alaska Women's Hall of Fame in 2012. Floyd attended Northwest Mississippi Community College, the University of Arkansas (bachelor's degree) and the University of Mississippi (master's degree). She died in 2022 at the age of 88.

== See also ==
- Carolyn Floyd Library
- List of mayors of Kodiak, Alaska
