= Howard Rock =

American newspaper editor

- Uyaġak (Weiyahok)

Personal details
- Born: August 10, 1911 Point Hope, Alaska, U.S.
- Died: April 20, 1976 (aged 64)
- Resting place: Point Hope, Alaska
- Parent(s): Keshorna (Emma Rock née Sikvoan); Weyahok/Uyaġak (Sam Rock)
- Profession: Newspaper editor, artist

Howard Rock or Uyaġak (previously written as Weiyahok) (August 10, 1911 – April 20, 1976) was an Iñupiaq newspaper editor, activist, and artist. He was well known for his artwork and for founding the first ever Alaska Native newspaper.

== Early life ==
Rock was born in Point Hope (Tikiġaq) in 1911. His Iñupiaq name Uyaġak (written at the time as Weiyahok) means "rock" in the Iñupiaq language. He went to high school at White Mountain Vocational School, and studied at the University of Washington for three years. After college, he became an artist, carving ivory until he was drafted during World War II. He returned to artwork after the war.

== Activism and The Tundra Times ==
He became involved in Alaska Native activism in 1961 after returning to Point Hope. He served as a spokesman for Point Hope in a dispute between the village and the U.S. Atomic Energy Commission over a proposed plan called Project Chariot to build an underwater harbor by exploding five atomic bombs in the area.

That same year he was approached by the Arctic Slope Native Association to form a newspaper. In October 1962, the Tundra Times was founded with Rock as editor and publisher, becoming the first Alaska Native newspaper in Alaska. The newspaper took on Project Chariot and the virtual enslavement of the Unangan (Aleut) people on St. Paul Island by the U.S. Government. The paper grew to a circulation of over 3,500 under his direction. He held the position of editor and publisher until his death in 1976. The Tundra Times helped support the land claims struggle that led to the Alaska Native Claims Settlement Act. In 1975, the Tundra Times was nominated for a Pulitzer Prize for meritorious public service. During his life, Rock received many awards including being named “Alaskan of the Year,” in 1974, and “49er of the Year,” in 1975.

== Death and legacy ==
Howard Rock died on April 20, 1976. The Howard Rock Award is given out to an outstanding Alaska Native leader by the First Alaskans Institute at their annual gala.

The Sheraton Anchorage Hotel's largest event space is the Howard Rock Ballroom.
