= Charles Wohlforth =

Charles P. Wohlforth (born 1963) is an author and journalist, former public official, and consultant. He has written extensively about Alaska and has collaborated with other authors on a variety of topics.

Wohlforth's books include The Whale and the Supercomputer: On the Northern Front of Climate Change, which won a Los Angeles Times Book Prize, in the Science and Technology category, in 2004, and more than 10 other books about science, environment, medicine, history, biography, and travel. His column in the Anchorage Daily News won the "Best of the West" award in 2019. Wohlforth served two terms on the Anchorage Assembly and led the Coalition for Education Equity as executive director for five years. He was a consultant on energy and transportation issues on the state and national level. He was host of several radio, podcast and TV programs on Alaska Public Media. He graduated from Princeton University with high honors in 1986.

== Partial bibliography ==
- How Covid Crashed the System: A Guide to Fixing American Health Care (By David B. Nash and Charles Wohlforth; Rowman and Littlefield, 2022)
- Beyond Earth: Our Path to a New Home in the Planets] (By Charles Wohlforth and Amanda Hendrix; Pantheon/Knopf, 2016).
- From the Shores of Ship Creek: Stories of Anchorage’s First 100 Years (Todd Communications, 2015).
- To Russia With Love: An Alaskan’s Journey (By Vic Fischer with Charles Wohlforth; University of Alaska Press, 2012).
- The Fate of Nature: Rediscovering Our Ability to Rescue the Earth (Thomas Dunne Books/St. Martin's Press, 2010).
- Saving for the Future: My Life and the Permanent Fund (By Dave Rose as told to Charles Wohlforth; Epicenter Press, 2008).
- The Whale and the Supercomputer: On the Northern Front of Climate Change (North Point Press/Farrar, Straus & Giroux, 2004).
- Frommer's Alaska (Wiley, 1996–2011). Fourteen editions
- Alaska For Dummies (Wiley, 2003–2011). Five editions
- Frommer's Family Vacations in the National Parks (Wiley, 1999–2004). Three editions
- Crisis in the Commons: The Alaska Solution (By Walter J. Hickel; Institute for Contemporary Studies, 2002).
- Spectacular Alaska (Hugh Lauter Levin Associates, 1998; revised edition, Universe, 2012).
