= Rich Gulch, California =

Unincorporated community in California, United States

Rich Gulch
- Unincorporated community
- Location in California Rich Gulch (the United States)
- Coordinates: 38°19′49″N 120°37′52″W
- Country: United States
- State: California
- County: Calaveras
- Elevation: 1,900 ft (580 m)

Rich Gulch (formerly Pleasant Springs) is an unincorporated community in Calaveras County, California, United States, 5 miles (8.0 km) east-northeast of Mokelumne Hill. It lies at an elevation of 1903 feet (580 m).

Rich Gulch was the seat of Calaveras County at one time, and at its 1850s peak was a significant gold-mining center home to some five thousand residents. The town saw a secondary mining boom in the 1880s. The 1862 hotel was still standing, abandoned, in 1920.

A post office was opened at Pleasant Springs in 1855. The name was changed to Rich Gulch in 1857. The post office was closed in 1867, re-established in 1887, and closed permanently in 1903.
