= Tundra Times =

Newspaper in Fairbanks, Alaska

- Type: Bi-weekly newspaper
- Editor: Howard Rock
- Founded: 1962
- Ceased publication: 1997
- Language: English
- Headquarters: Fairbanks, Alaska
- ISSN: 0049-4801
- OCLC number: 2712152

The Tundra Times was a bi-weekly newspaper published in Fairbanks, Alaska from 1962 to 1997.

== Background ==
The first edition of "The Eskimo-Indian All-Alaska Newspaper" was published on 1 October 1962, and was written by and for Alaska Natives aiming to serve as the "medium to aid (Natives) in their struggle for just determination and settlement of their enormous problems...(and) to keep informed on matters of interest to all Natives of Alaska."

The newspaper's first editor was Uyaġak Howard Rock (1911–1976), an Inupiaq from Point Hope. Howard convinced Fairbanks reporter Tom Snap to help him out with the first issue.

The Tundra Times ceased publication in 1997, but its photographic archive was acquired by the Tuzzy Consortium Library and is available online.
