= Emily Morgan (nurse) =

American nurse (1878–1960)

- Born: March 7, 1878; Leon, Kansas
- Died: May 9, 1960 (aged 82)
- Education: Leon High School (1897), Nursing degree from Missouri Methodist Hospital (1905)
- Occupation: Nurse
- Known for: "Angel of the Yukon"
- Notable work: Administered serum during Nome, Alaska diphtheria epidemic

Emily Morgan (March 7, 1878 – May 9, 1960) was a nurse known as the "Angel of the Yukon". She was born in Kansas, and would travel to Nome, Alaska, by dog sled in 1925 to administer serum in Nome, Alaska, which was on the verge of a diphtheria epidemic.

== Biography ==
She was born on March 7, 1878, in Leon. She graduated from Leon High School in 1897 and received her nursing degree from the Missouri Methodist Hospital in 1905. A registered nurse trained by the American Red Cross in Wichita, Kansas, she had been sent to Alaska by the Red Cross in 1923. Previously, Morgan served as a missionary in Panama and India, as well as serving as a nurse during World War I, in France, Germany, Italy, Belgium, England and Australia.

When she returned to Wichita, she became the first school nurse. As she was in charge of Maynard Columbus Hospital in Nome, Morgan was the nurse responsible for administering the serum in Nome, Alaska. For this, she was called the "Angel of the Yukon".

She was in charge of Barrow Hospital when Wiley Post and Will Rogers' bodies were brought in.

During World War II, Morgan was a nurse in New Zealand. She died on May 9, 1960, at the age of 82.
