= Seldovia Police Department (Alaska) =

Law enforcement agency in Seldovia, Alaska, United States

Coordinates: 59°26′17″N 151°42′41″W

- Abbreviation: SPD

Agency overview
- Employees: 1

Jurisdictional structure
- Operations jurisdiction: Seldovia, Alaska, USA
- Area: 0.55 square miles (1.4 km^{2})
- Population: 235 (2020)
- General nature: Civilian police

Operational structure
- Headquarters: The Chief Andy Anderson Seldovia Police Station; 245 Lipke Lane, Seldovia, Alaska 99663
- Police Officers: 1
- Civilians: 0

Website
- Seldovia Police

The Seldovia Police Department (SPD) is a law enforcement agency which serves Seldovia, Alaska.

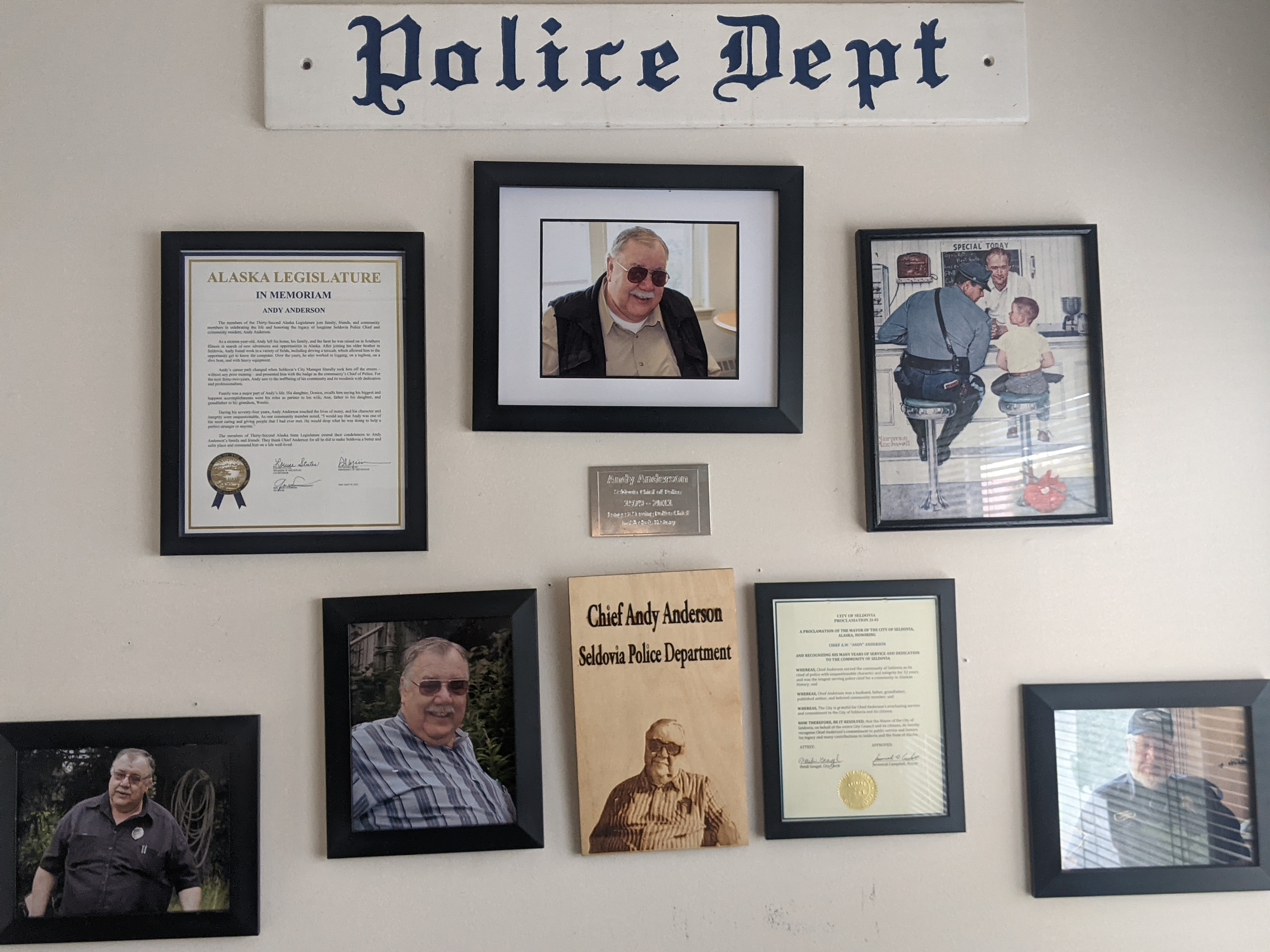
Seldovia Police Department, memorial to A.W. "Andy" Anderson

The agency headquarters is located at 274 Lipke Lane, and is named after Alaska's longest serving chief of police, Andy Anderson. Anderson served for over 30 years, from 1979-2011. Anderson died in 2020. Because of his popularity to the local residents, the police station was posthumously renamed "The Chief Andy Anderson Seldovia Police Station" in his honor.

== Overview ==
The department is allocated one full-time sworn officer, who is also the Chief of Police. The officer handles cases inside Seldovia city limits. The city has a Special Services Contract Agreement with Alaska State Troopers, which is an annual contract that must be explicitly approved each year. With this agreement, the agency also provides limited police service to Seldovia Village and to the road system in and around the City. When the Seldovia officer is not available, State Troopers handle calls inside the city limits.

The department has a short-term detention facility available.

== Police Chiefs ==
service begins	service ends	Officer	Notes
1974	1979	Gary Gunken	
1979	1979	Leonard Lusk	Summer during school break
1979	2011	A. W. "Andy" Anderson	
2011	2014	Shad Haller	
2015	2016	Hal Henning	
2016	2018	Robin Daniels	
2018	2020	Paul Cushman	
2020	Nov. 9, 2022	Claine Hawkins	

After Chief Hawkins, the role of Police Chief was replaced by Village Public Safety Officers. As of 2023, two VPSOs serve the community, Officer Morgan and Officer Patterson.

== See also ==
- List of law enforcement agencies in Alaska

== Sources ==
- Yolanda Martinez and Celina Fang, Photographs by Harris Mizrahi (October 26, 2018). "When You're the Only Cop in Town".
- Anderson, A. W. "Andy" (September 1, 2020). Alaska Bush Cop: And The beat Goes On. Publication Consultants.
