= Alaska State Troopers =

State police agency of the U.S. state of Alaska

Division of Alaska State Troopers
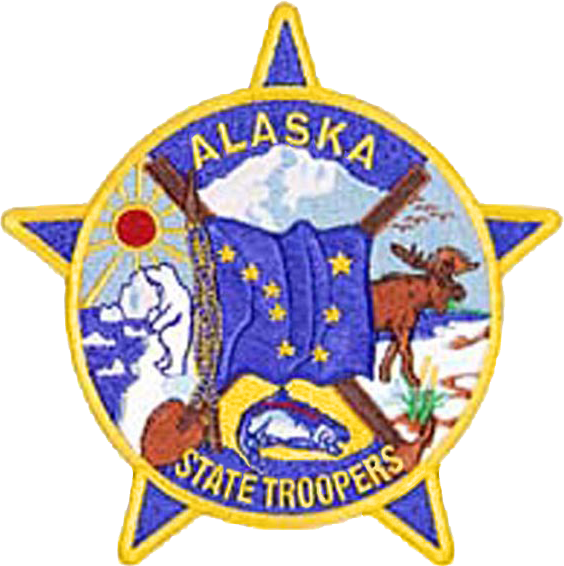
- Patch of the Alaska State Troopers

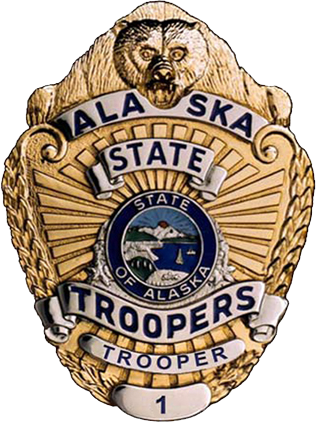
- Badge of the Alaska State Troopers

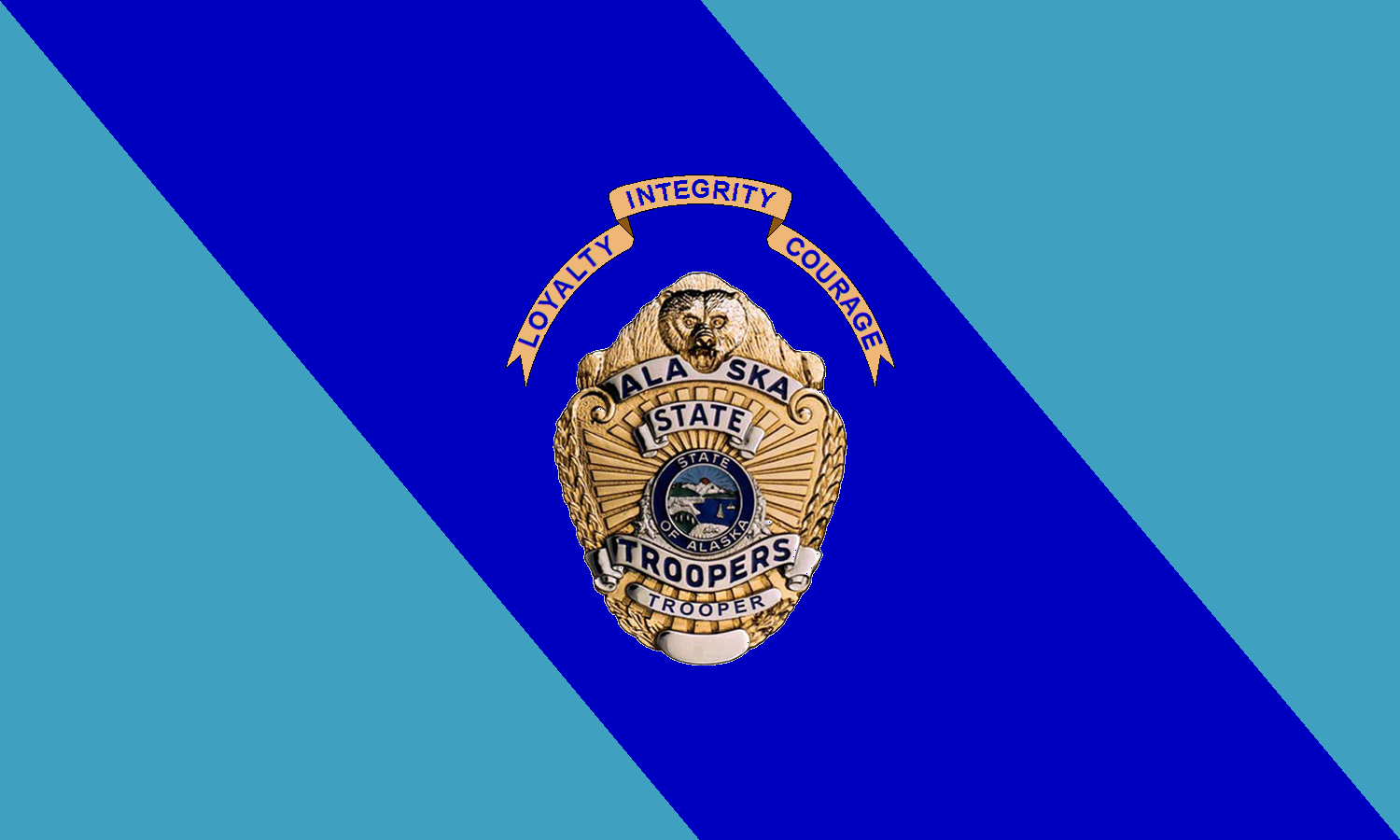
- Flag of the Alaska State Troopers
- Common name: Alaska State Troopers
- Abbreviation: AST
- Motto: "Loyalty, Integrity, Courage"

Agency overview
- Formed: 1967; 59 years ago
- Preceding agencies: Alaska Highway Patrol (1941–1953); Alaska Territorial Police (1953–1959); Alaska State Police (1959–1967)

Jurisdictional structure
- Operations jurisdiction: Alaska, U.S.
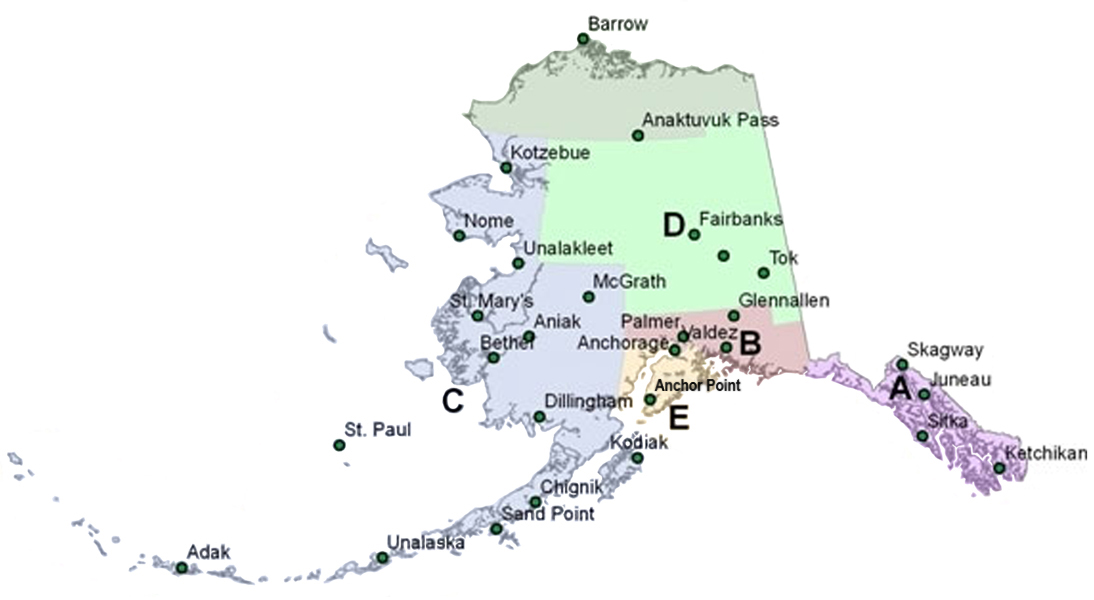
- Alaska State Trooper Detachments
- Area: 663,268 square miles (1,717,900 km^{2})
- Population: 736,556 (2022)
- General nature: Civilian police

Operational structure
- Headquarters: Anchorage, Alaska
- Troopers: 365 (official, as of 2022)
- Civilian members: 216
- Agency executive: Colonel Mo Hughes, Director, AST
- Parent agency: Alaska Department of Public Safety
- Bureaus: 2
- Detachments: 5

Website
- https://dps.alaska.gov/AST/Home

The Alaska State Troopers, officially the Division of Alaska State Troopers (AST), is the state police agency of the U.S. state of Alaska. It is a division of the Alaska Department of Public Safety (DPS). The AST is a full-service law enforcement agency that handles both traffic and criminal law enforcement. The AST is also involved in apprehending fugitives as part of the Alaska Fugitive Task Force, an inter-agency collaborative of Alaska police departments that cooperates with police agencies throughout the United States and less commonly with Interpol in apprehending wanted men and women. Unlike many lower 48 states, the AST also serves as Alaska’s primary environmental law enforcement agency; troopers assigned to the AST’s Division of Alaska Wildlife Troopers are known as "Alaska Wildlife Troopers" and primarily serve as game wardens, although they retain the same powers as other Alaskan state troopers.

Because Alaska has no counties, therefore no county police or sheriffs, in its constitution, the troopers also handle civil papers and mental health custody orders and serve as police through most of rural Alaska. Alaska does have boroughs, which have some similarities but with the lesser powers of lower-48 U.S. counties, but only the North Slope Borough Police Department truly functions similarly to a lower-48 county police agency, thus relieving AST of the need to be the primary police agency in this particular region. With jurisdiction across all 663,268 square miles (1,717,856 square kilometres) of Alaska, Alaskan state troopers are the most geographically extended law enforcement officers within the United States, apart from federal officers. They have little, if any, local backup. Within the entire State of Alaska, only about 1,300 full-time sworn law enforcement officers patrol a state 1/5th the size of the entire Lower 48. Other than troopers and state park rangers (peace officers employed by Alaska’s Division of Parks and Outdoor Recreation), local officers remain in their communities except in extreme emergencies. This includes the largest metropolitan police agency in Alaska, the Anchorage Police Department, with almost 300 officers, and the Wasilla Police Department, with about 28 officers. The remaining officers are the over 300 Alaska troopers and smaller municipal agencies, which have around 50 in towns like the state capital of Juneau or the second largest town in the state, Fairbanks. The remaining full-time officers serve in small agencies with anywhere from one to ten officers on average. The Alaska State Troopers are assisted in their rural policing duties by Village Public Safety Officers (VPSOs). VPSOs are, as of 2014, fully sworn and armed peace officers who handle basic law enforcement in extremely remote and/or small Alaskan communities; Alaskan state troopers travel to these communities to assist VPSOs as needed.

The DPS is headed by a Commissioner appointed by the Governor. This person is a civilian administrator, though historically he was a career law enforcement officer and administrator. The Commissioner, if a sworn officer upon being appointed as such, may be appointed a "Special Alaska State Trooper" to maintain police powers. The Alaska State Troopers (AST) and Alaska Wildlife Troopers (AWT) are headed by ranking officers with the rank of Colonel.

== History ==
The Alaska State Troopers trace their heritage back more than a century. Before its founding, law enforcement in Alaska was performed by a succession of federal agencies: the Army, Navy, and Revenue Cutter Service; the Customs Service; and the Marshals Service. After a civil government was formed in 1884, the need for law enforcement became critical in the late 19th century as gold was discovered in Alaska. Gold rush towns had crime rates per capita that dwarfed those of modern U.S. cities. Prostitution, gambling, murder, rape, robbery, arson, kidnapping, aggravated assault, and claim jumping incidents were rampant. Frightened citizens desperately called for help. As a result, scores of deputy marshals were deployed to Alaska. Some cities and towns began to charter police departments in the early 20th century. Deputy marshals continued to be the main force of law in rural Alaska until the advent of the troopers, and many early-era officers of the agency were former deputy marshals.

There was no Alaska-wide police force until 1941, when the territorial legislature created the Alaska Highway Patrol. Territorial patrolmen only patrolled the main highways of Alaska and did not visit remote areas or regions. They were commissioned to only enforce traffic laws. They were eventually deputized as special deputy marshals to fill this void in jurisdiction. The legislature refused to make them police officers until the agency was changed to Territorial Police and additional personnel were hired from among the marshals' ranks. The new agency became the Alaska Territorial Police in 1953, the Alaska State Police in 1959 after Alaska became a State, and changed its title to Alaska State Troopers in 1967.

== Duties ==
The Division of Alaska State Troopers personnel are the general police arm of the agency. They are charged with statewide law enforcement, prevention of crimes, pursuit and apprehension of offenders, service of civil and criminal process, prisoner transportation, central communications, and search and rescue. They perform traditional duties most closely associated with state police in the lower 48 states.

=== National security and post-9/11 roles ===
The Alaska State Troopers trace special duties back to the onset of World War II, when Territorial Highway Patrolmen watched for Japanese invaders and saboteurs by guarding and patrolling Alaska seaports, railroad tracks, airports, military posts and other important facilities. This was especially critical following the invasion of Alaska by the Japanese. Territorial patrolmen also assisted the military by arresting deserters and AWOLS from the armed forces.

After the 9-11 attacks, Alaska State Troopers were recognized by the US government as being in an extremely valuable and unique position and thus a critical asset to national security. Alaska is by distance close to a nuclear-armed nation—North Korea—and even closer to the People's Republic of China. Alaska actually borders Russia and these factors have caused AST to have a historic role in national security. AST and ABI in particular, assist the DEA, US Department of Homeland Security, FBI and the BATFE and other federal and military agencies in protecting the US from terrorist activity. ABI assisted the FBI in 2009 in a high-profile preemptive terrorism investigation that resulted in the arrest of a man and woman who were radical Islamist converts and who were planning terrorist attacks from King Salmon, AK. Trooper aircraft historically kept a watchful eye for intrusions into US airspace by Soviet aircraft during the Cold War. As a state entity, AST pilots and aviation assets continue to watch over Alaskan airspace to date in conjunction with the Alaska Wing of the Civil Air Patrol (CAP), in providing protection from threats to national security as it assists the US Coast Guard, US Air Force and US Army air operations as requested.

== Rank structure ==
Title	Insignia
Commissioner	
Deputy Commissioner	
Colonel	
Major	
Captain	
Lieutenant	
Sergeant	
Corporal	
Trooper	No Insignia

== Organization ==
=== Alaska Bureau of Highway Patrol ===
The Bureau of Highway Patrol (ABHP) is a small division of troopers based out of Seward who focus on the stretch of the Seward Highway near Girdwood. Their primary responsibility is enforcement of the state's impaired driving laws, and traffic enforcement. They also provide assistance in the investigation of fatal and major incapacitating accidents. Troopers in this unit may also respond to standard calls.

=== Alaska Bureau of Investigations ===
The Alaska Bureau of Investigations (ABI) is responsible for coordinating and conducting major criminal investigations within Alaska State Troopers jurisdiction to include homicides, sexual assaults, polygraph examinations, fraud, forgery, computer and internet crimes, surveillance, missing persons and lengthier property crimes investigations. ABI headquarters is located in Anchorage with posts in Anchorage, Fairbanks, Juneau, Soldotna, Wasilla. The ABI consists of seven Investigation Units are; Major Crimes, Technical Crimes, Property Crimes, Financial Crimes, Child Abuse Investigations, Cold Case Investigations, and Statewide Drug Enforcement.

=== Special Weapons and Tactics Team ===
The Alaska State Trooper Special Weapons and Tactics (AST SWAT) responds to high-risk incidents including hostage situations, warrant executions, and terrorist incidents. SWAT is an added, voluntary assignment for specially-qualified Troopers in addition to their other duties. SWAT Troopers train regularly and remain on call after hours for emergencies.

AST SWAT Posts:

- Fairbanks
- Palmer
- Soldotna

=== Statewide Drug Enforcement Unit ===
The Statewide Drug Enforcement Unit (SDEU) works by providing funding, resources and direct assistance to a number of agencies operating within the state of Alaska. SDEU also investigates criminal cases involving drugs or alcohol. SDEU operates by "aggressively confront[ing] drug and alcohol traffickers."

SDEU's Mission Statement:

- Interdict and seize alcohol and controlled substances that are illegally distributed throughout Alaska
- Identify and arrest distributors of controlled substances and illegal alcohol
- Provide training and investigative support to criminal justice agencies
- Support and participate in public education programs

=== Search and rescue ===
The Alaska State Troopers are required by section 18.60.120 of Alaska law to provide and coordinate search and rescue efforts across the state. The Search and Rescue (SAR) Section is headed by a coordinator who is on 24/7 standby. Upon being called, the SAR section may provide watercraft, aircraft and other equipment to assist in SAR efforts. Part of SAR's responsibilities is to coordinate rescue efforts with other SAR groups such as the US Coast Guard or non-profits such as the Alaska Mountain Rescue Group. Another responsibility of the SAR section is to allocate funding and grants to the various non-profits and regional SAR organizations across the state.

=== Posts and locations ===
The Alaska State Troopers are organized by detachments, each having posts in various cities, towns and villages. The Alaska State Troopers also have various other types of facilities throughout the state, such as the training academy in Sitka. AST also partners with various facilities such as the MATCOM dispatch center in the Mat-Su Valley Borough or the Regional Training Facility ran by the Anchorage Police Department.

=== Posts ===
A Detachment North:

- Anchor Point
- Seward
- Soldotna (Headquarters)

A Detachment South:

- Craig
- Ketchikan (Headquarters)
- Juneau

B Detachment:

- Glennallen
- Wasilla
- Palmer (Headquarters)

C Detachment:

- Anchorage (Headquarters)
- Aniak
- Bethel
- Dillingham
- Emmonak
- Illiamna
- King Salmon
- Kodiak
- Kotzebue
- McGrath
- Nome
- Saint Mary’s
- Selawik
- Unalakleet

D Detachment:

- Cantwell
- Delta Junction
- Fairbanks
- Galena
- Healy
- Nenana
- Tok

=== Other facilities ===
Dispatch Centers:

- Northern Dispatch Center, Fairbanks
- MATCOM Center (Contracted), Matanuska-Susitna Borough
- Soldotna Public Safety Communications Center (Contracted), Kenai Peninsula Borough

Training Facilities:

- Public Safety Academy, Sitka
- Regional Training Center (Anchorage Police), Anchorage

=== Alaska Department of Public Safety Training Academy ===
The Alaska Department of Public Safety Training Academy, located in Sitka, is run by the Alaska State Troopers. It is tasked with training the officers of every agency in the state of Alaska, with the exception of the Anchorage Police Department and any federal law enforcement agencies operating in Alaska.

==== Structure ====
The Public Safety Training Academy is run by the Director who is the rank of Lieutenant and the Deputy Director who is the rank of Sergeant. The Academy also has instructors who are the rank of Corporal. There are also civilian staff members tasked with office work, food preparation, maintenance, and janitorial duties.

==== Organization ====
The Public Safety Training Academy operates on a two cycles, one in the spring, and one in the fall. Each class is given an "ALET" designation, meaning Alaska Law Enforcement Training. The Academy is 16 weeks long, and has a two week extension for troopers who are being hired into the Division of Alaska State Troopers or Wildlife Troopers. These two weeks focus on survival training and preparation for many of Alaska's environmental hazards. Classes include lessons on firearms, non-lethal weaponry, emergency vehicle operation courses (EVOC), and general classroom lessons on things such as laws, court cases, and officer safety. Officers must also go through physical training and be physically competent.

==== Requirements ====
The Alaska Police Standards Council (APSC) and Alaska Department of Public Safety (ADPS) have certain requirements for peace officers in the state of Alaska:

- Must be 18 to attend the ADPS Academy, 21 to receive an APSC certification
- High school graduation or GED
- United States citizenship
- Good moral character
- No physical defects that would adversely affect performance
- Valid driver's license
- Never has been convicted of a felony
- Never has been convicted of a misdemeanor of moral turpitude within the preceding 10 years
- Never has been denied an APSC peace officer's certification
- Never has had an APSC peace officer's certification revoked
- Has not used marijuana within the preceding one year
- Has never lied on the APSC application

=== Expectations ===
The ADPS Training Academy has the following expectations for recruits:

- Ability to read and comprehend Federal and State laws
- Ability to use senses, and demonstrate sound reasoning and judgment
- Act and think quickly in emergency situations
- Ability to communicate effectively, both orally and in writing
- Operate a motor vehicle with a valid drivers license
- Differentiate colors
- General computer literacy
- General mathematics
- Leadership abilities

== Village Public Safety Officer Program ==
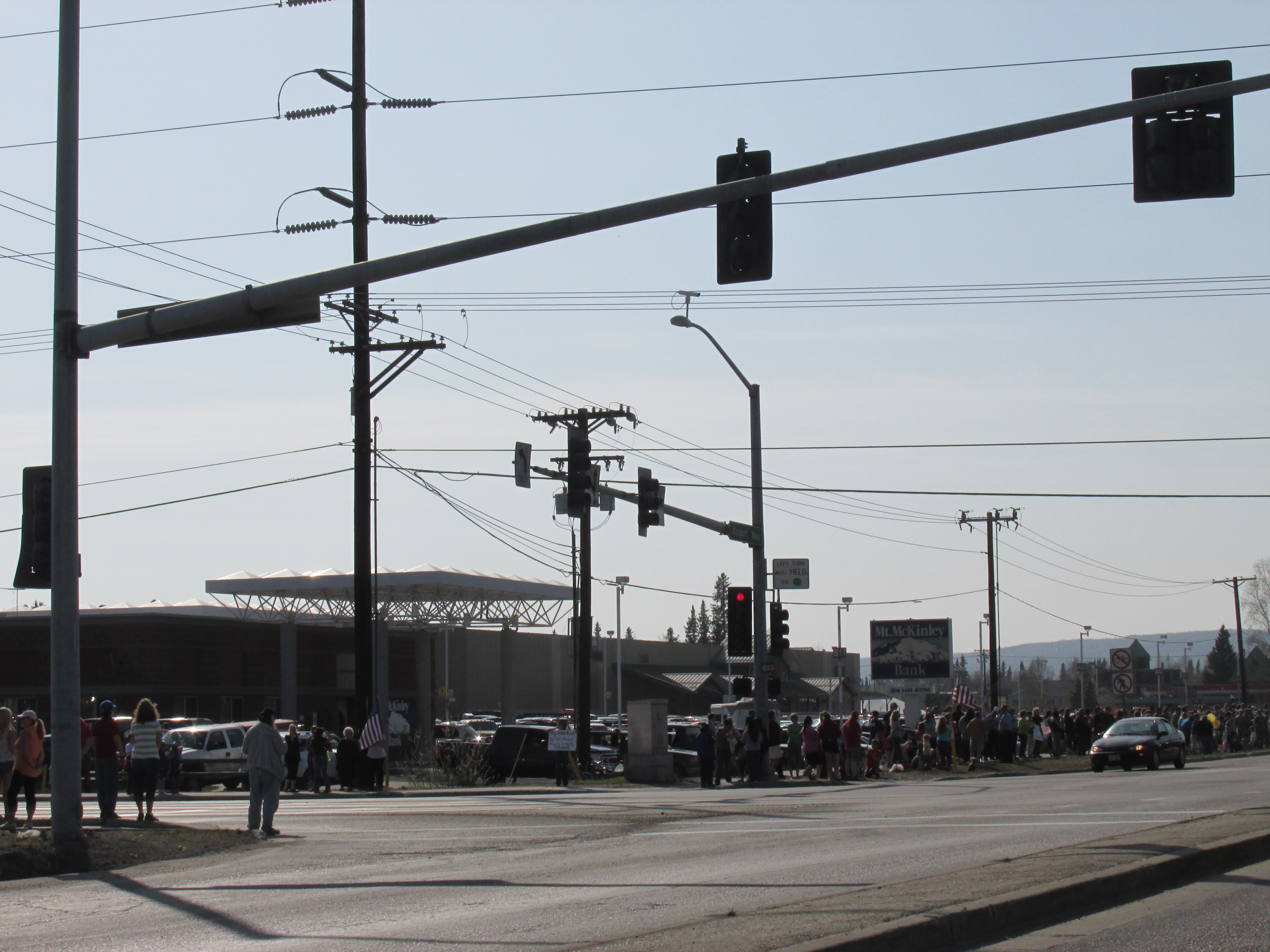

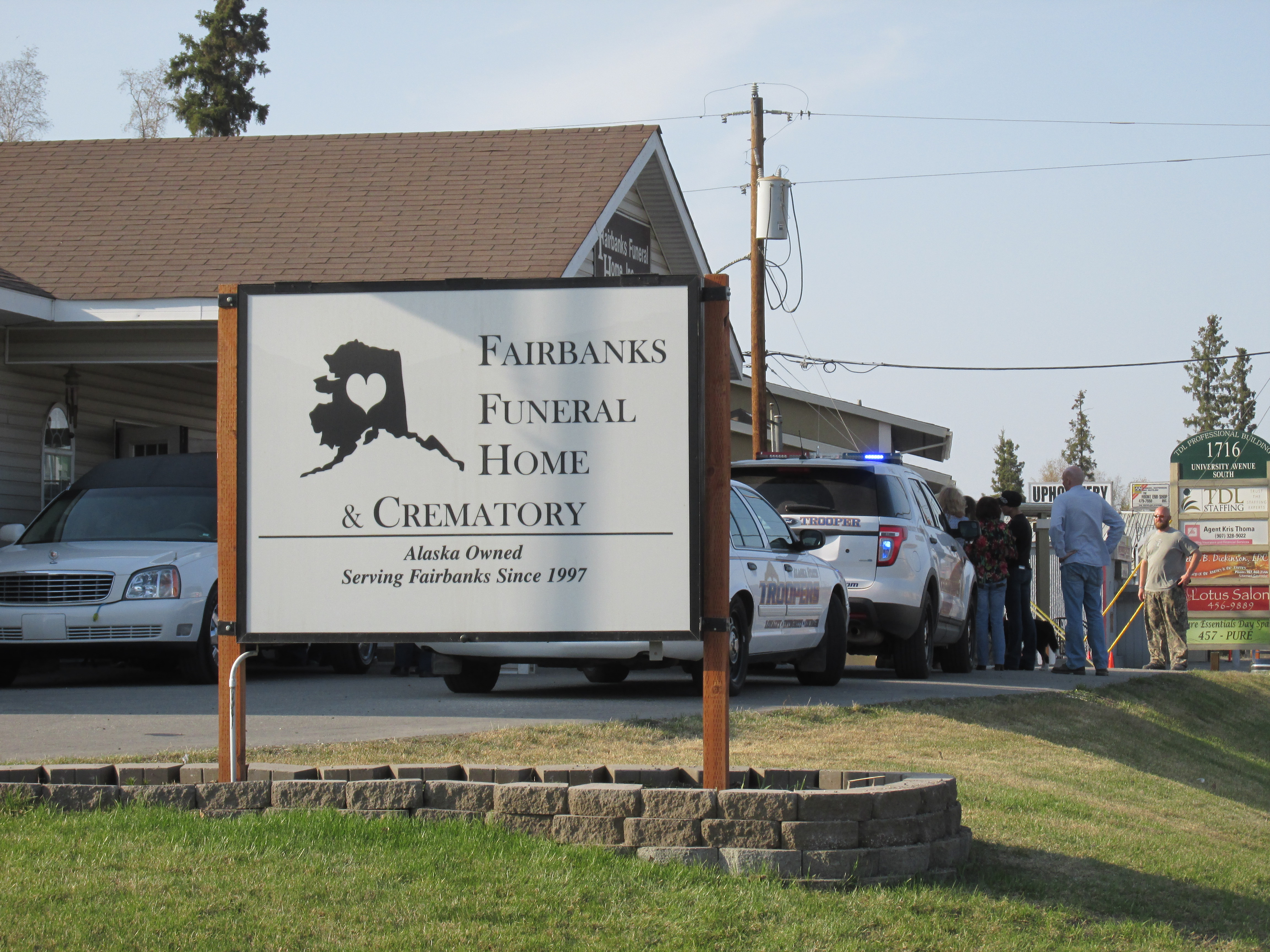
Crowds gathered on Airport Way in Fairbanks (top) while fellow troopers transport the bodies of Gabriel Rich and Scott Johnson from Fairbanks International Airport to a private funeral service (bottom).

The Alaska State Troopers also manage the Village Public Safety Officer program, which provides a peace officer presence in remote communities, usually Native villages that have no police departments and are too small for a trooper post. VPSOs are state trained peace officers, and as of July 2014 are fully credentialed Alaska police officers. They carried no firearms from the start of the program in the mid-1970s until the Alaska legislature authorized arming the officers and making them fully empowered peace officers as of July 2014. This legal change was in response to the violent assaults, shootings and even two murders of VPSOs in the line-of-duty on differing occasions. The DPS Academy is tasked to train and certify VPSOs with firearms. In addition, VPSOs also carry all other typical tools of a peace officer, such as Kevlar bullet resistant body armor, TASER electronic control weapon, pepper spray, and baton. The VPSO 9-week basic training course at the DPS Academy mirrors several aspects of the ALET program except that VPSOs do not receive basic emergency vehicle operation course (EVOC). If a VPSO should later opt to join a police department after completion of VPSO training, they would not be required to attend the full DPS Law Enforcement Training Program.

VPSOs are employed by local Native Corporations and supervised by designated area Troopers. VPSOs carry out only basic police tasks such as emergency call response, juvenile offense investigations, protective custody holds of inebriates, assistance to social workers and medical providers, crime scene preservation, issuance of citations for misdemeanor and non-criminal violation offenses, misdemeanor arrests and detention of felony suspects for surrender to troopers, wildlife protection through the Division of Fish and Wildlife Enforcement, engage in search and rescue of missing persons and perform services usually performed by county sheriff's departments in other states, such as prisoner transport. VPSOs usually also receive Alaska Firefighter-I training and either Alaska Emergency Medical Technician-I (EMT-I) or Alaska Emergency Trauma Technician (ETT) in addition to the basic training.

The Village Public Safety Officer Program began in the late 1970s as a means of providing rural Alaskan communities with needed public safety services at the local level. The program was created to reduce the loss of life due to fires, drowning, lost persons, and the lack of immediate emergency medical assistance in rural communities. The Village Public Safety Officer Program was designed to train and employ individuals residing in the village as first responders to public safety emergencies such as search and rescue, fire protection, emergency medical assistance, crime prevention and basic law enforcement. Recent pay raises, statutory changes for firearms armed VPSOs and other areas of expanded training have improved the retention and recruitment of VPSOs.

== Fallen officers ==
There have been 16 Alaska State Troopers, 1 Court Services Officer, and 2 K9s killed since its beginning in 1948.

== Equipment ==
=== Firearms ===
Name	Type	Caliber	Origin	Notes
Glock 17 Gen 5 MOS	Pistol	9x19mm	Austria	Standard Issue ( With Holosun Red Dot Sight )
Remington 870	Shotgun	12 Gauge	United States	
Colt AR-15	Patrol Rifle	5.56mm	United States	
Heckler & Koch MP5	Sub-Machine Gun	9x19mm	Germany	Special Weapons and Tactics Team only
Remington 700	Sniper Rifle	.308 Winchester	United States	Special Weapons and Tactics Team only

Smith and Wesson M&P model 10 .308 Current issue to AWT

=== Vehicles ===
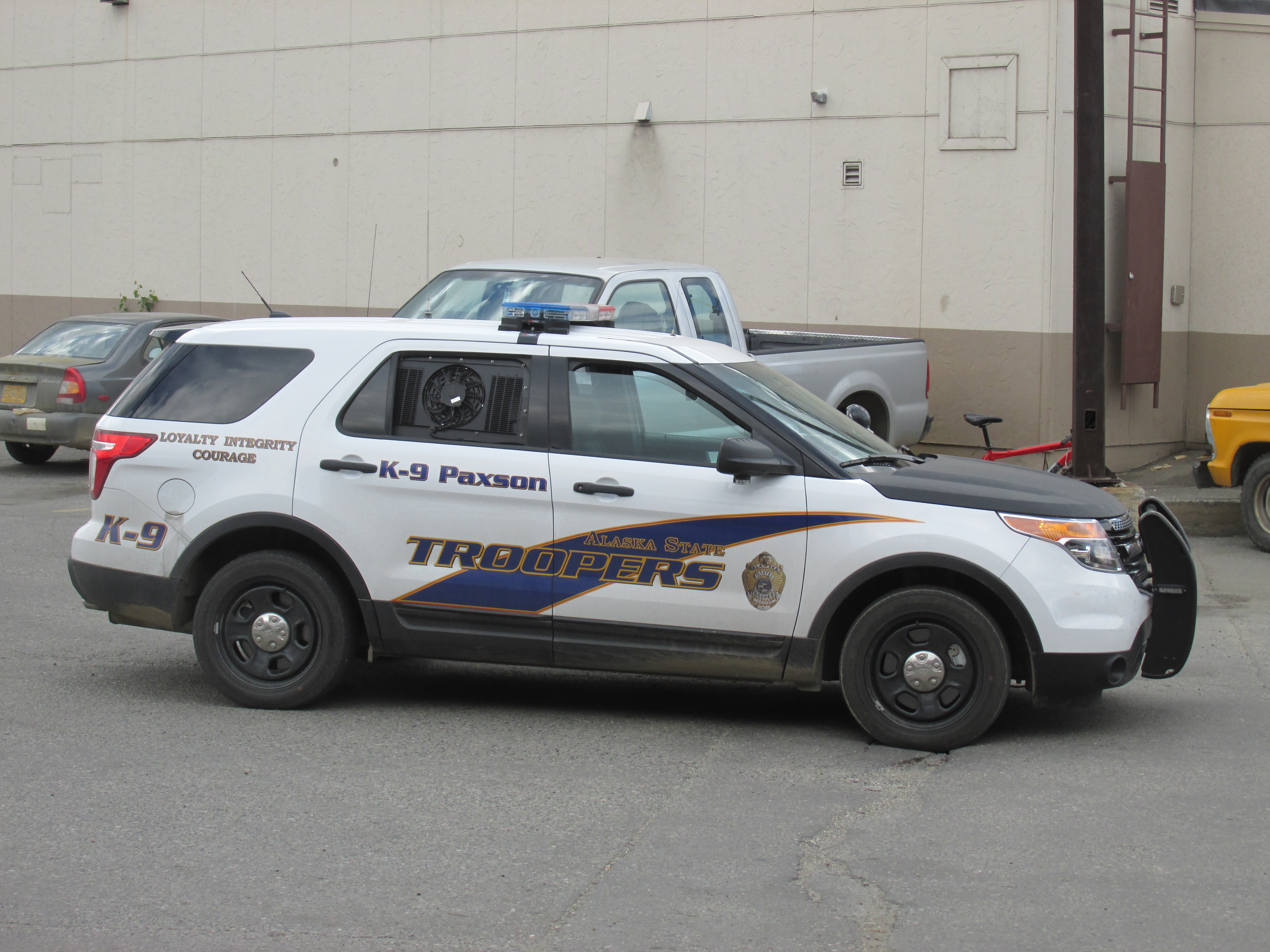
K-9 unit at a traffic stop in College in June 2014. The vehicle, a 2014 Ford Police Interceptor Utility, was one of the first such vehicles AST acquired to replace the Ford Expeditions long used for K-9 units. Note the fan installed in the window bay of the rear passenger door.

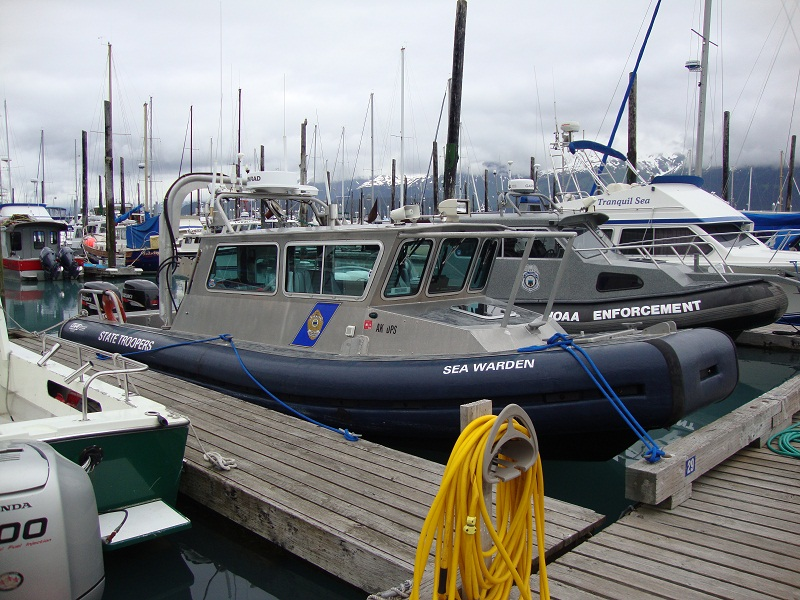
The Sea Warden, a high speed watercraft used by AST, docked in Seward.

The Alaska State Troopers operate the following vehicles:

- Chevy Tahoe United States
- Chevy Express Van United States
- Chevrolet Impala United States
- Chevy pickup truck United States
- Dodge Charger United States
- Ford Crown Victoria Police Interceptor United States
- Ford Police Interceptor Sedan United States
- Ford Police Interceptor Utility United States
- Ford Expedition United States
- Ford F-250 United States
- Ford F-150 United States
- Lenco BearCat United States – 3

=== Aircraft ===
- Beechcraft Super King Air United States
- Cessna 185 United States
- Cessna 208 United States
- Eurocopter AS350 France
- Piper PA-18 United States – used for fisheries patrol
- Robinson R44 United States

=== Previously-issued sidearms ===
- Glock Model 22 .40 S&W-replaced by the Glock 17 Gen 5 MOS
- Smith & Wesson Model 4006 .40 S&W- replaced by the Glock Model 22 .40 S&W
- Smith & Wesson Model 686 .357 magnum- replaced by the Smith & Wesson Model 4006
- Smith & Wesson Model 66 .357 magnum- replaced by the Smith & Wesson Model 686
- Smith & Wesson Model 19 .357 magnum- replaced by the Smith & Wesson Model 66

== Museum ==
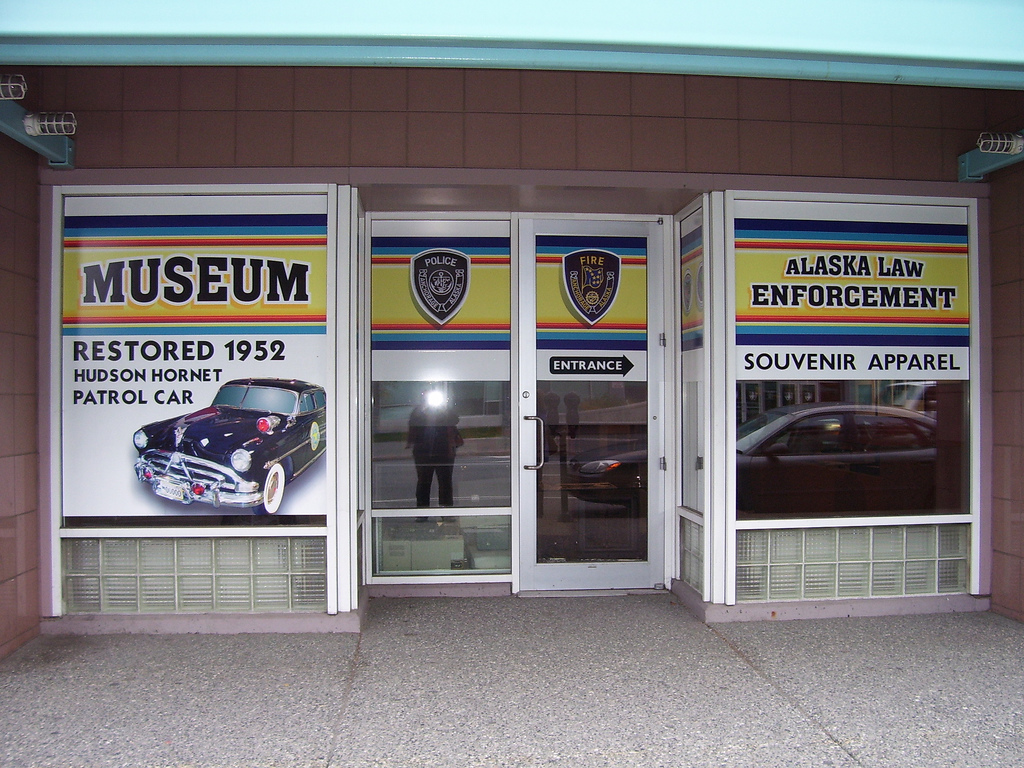
Museum entrance.

The Alaska Law Enforcement Museum is a small museum located at 245 W. 5th Avenue, Suite 113 across from the 5th Avenue Mall in downtown Anchorage, operated by the Fraternal Order of Alaska State Troopers. The museum commemorates the Alaska State Troopers and features a variety of historical memorabilia, including a restored 1952 Hudson Hornet patrol car.

== In popular culture ==
- The National Geographic television reality series Alaska State Troopers accompanied troopers throughout the state as they performed their various duties. The show depicted firsthand, the short-handed troopers in their harsh and dangerous duties of the AST.
- Alaska State Troopers appeared regularly on Ice Road Truckers, Tougher in Alaska and Deadliest Catch.
- In the movie The Frozen Ground, Nicolas Cage portrays an Alaska State Trooper.
- In the fourth season of HBO's True Detective Kali Reis portrays an Alaska State Trooper.

== See also ==
- Alaska State Troopers (TV series)
- Alaska Public Safety Commissioner dismissal
- Highway patrol
- Jean Frances Howard, who was AST's first female sworn officer and was inducted into the Alaska Women's Hall of Fame by virtue of that accomplishment of being a State Trooper
- List of law enforcement agencies in Alaska
- State Patrol
- State police (United States)
