= JPD =

JPD may refer to:

== People ==
- John Dwyer (musician), American musician

== Police departments ==
- Jackson Police Department (Mississippi)
- Juneau Police Department

== Other ==
- Joint Planning Document
- Judges for Democracy (Jueces para la Democracia)
- Joint probability distribution
- Journal of Physics D
