= Alaska State Troopers (TV series) =

American television series about the Alaska state police

- Narrated by: Marc Graue
- Country of origin: United States
- Original language: English
- No. of seasons: 8
- No. of episodes: 95

Production
- Executive producer: Michael Welsh
- Producer: Brian Jones
- Camera setup: Multiple
- Running time: 42 minutes
- Production company: PSG Films

Original release
- Network: National Geographic Channel
- Release: October 14, 2009 – April 15, 2015
- Network: A&E
- Release: January 7, 2026 – present

Alaska State Troopers is an American documentary television series that originally aired on National Geographic Channel from October 14, 2009 to April 15, 2015. Narrated for its first 8 seasons by Marc Graue, the show follows the daily beats of various bureaus within the Alaska State Troopers. In addition, the show features segments that follow village public safety officers from small rural villages as well as officers from other cities such as Wasilla, Palmer, Anchorage, and Soldotna.

The show follows the exploits of a number of officers from all regions of the state. Troopers who are seen on the show include James and Anne Sears, Howie Peterson, Jon Simeon and Brent Johnson, Scott Quist, Odean Hall, Lonny Piscoya, Luis Nieves, Dan Dahl, Rick Roberts, Abraham Garcia, Dan Cox, Gabe Rich, Michael Munson, Jonathan Stroebele, Dan Gunderson, Joshua Varys, JJ Hennessey, Melvin Colley, Ken Van Spronsen, Daron Cooper, Lance Ewers, Jared Noll, Terrence Shanigan, Blake Calhoun, Brandon Viator, Tony Wegrzyn, William Connors, Jimmy Buttrey, Kamau Leigh, and Garrett Frost.

Although the show is aired in many countries, the National Geographic Channel has so far not released DVDs of the series outside of the United States.

The fifth season premiered on September 15, 2013. The sixth season premiered on April 10, 2014. After a total of 8 seasons the series was not continued, because "It was just time to focus on the job of providing public safety without any added outside distractions".

A new 10-episode season of the show, its first in 10 years, premiered on A&E on January 7, 2026.

== Officers from the program who have died in the line of duty ==
On March 30, 2013, two troopers featured in the program were killed in a helicopter crash during a search and rescue (SAR) mission near Talkeetna. Tage Brandel Toll and pilot Mel Nading were killed when they were returning with a rescued snowmobiler. The snowmobiler also died in the crash.

In 2014, the NTSB concluded the accident was caused by pilot error, and the Alaska DPS and the Alaska state troopers' safety culture. The department had been neglecting the issues in the lack of training for both the pilot and observer. And the error of the pilot was to fly into the severely bad weather for which he was not adequately trained.

On May 1, 2014, two troopers featured in the program were shot and killed in Tanana, a small town in Alaska's interior. The officers were reported to be Trooper Gabriel "Gabe" Rich (26) and Sgt. Patrick "Scott" Johnson (45).

A 19-year-old man, Nathanial "Sach" Kangas, was arrested in connection with the shootings. Troopers had responded to the town after the local village public safety officer (VPSO) requested back up in an earlier incident involving the father of the shooting suspect. In addition to the murder charges against his son, the elder Kangas was arrested and charged with assaulting the VPSO, and for driving with a suspended license the previous day.

To the date of writing, 4 officers who have participated in the show have been killed in the line of duty.

== Episodes ==
=== Season 1 (2009) ===
No. overall	No. in season	Title	Original release date
1	1	"Ice Patrol"	October 14, 2009
2	2	"Crimes on the Kenai"	October 21, 2009
Families in Girdwood are ecstatic when troopers, on S&R duty, arrive at the airport with fishermen whose boat had overturned in the Twenty-Mile River. The impaired driver of an ATV which was involved in a single-vehicle-crash resists being transported to Wildwood Center. Guards at the Center describe the booking process.
3	3	"The Wild West"	October 28, 2009
A trooper from Nome flies to Brevig Mission to serve a warrant, and transports the person to Anvil Mtn Correctional Ctr. in Nome. An investigator from the Western Alaska Alcohol and Narcotics Team interviews people who are flying to 'local option' (dry) villages. Two people are carrying alcohol illegally. Troopers keep track of spring flooding long the Yukon River. A trooper investigates an assault case reported by a village police officer.
4	4	"Frontier Force"	November 4, 2009
5	5	"Drug Bust"	November 11, 2009
6	6	"Alaskan Justice"	December 16, 2009

=== Season 2 (2011) ===
No. overall	No. in season	Title	Original release date
7	1	"Spring Break Madness"	January 9, 2011
A double-duration episode starts with policing the 'Arctic Man' celebration in the Hoodoo mountains, where races, drinking, and an unwittingly cooperative drug dealer (who directs troopers to his stash) keep law enforcers busy. A troopers's flight to Little Diomede Island gives an opportunity to speak to school children and reinforce safety around polar bears. Troopers in the Matanuska-Susitna (Mat-Su) Valley respond to suicide calls, and a trooper describes his coping technique.
8	2	"Arctic Force"	January 15, 2011
9	3	"Justice Below Zero"	January 16, 2011
10	4	"Manhunt"	January 23, 2011
11	5	"Shots Fired"	January 30, 2011
12	6	"Armed and Dangerous"	February 13, 2011
13	7	"High-Speed Chase"	February 20, 2011
14	8	"Crime Under the Midnight Sun"	February 27, 2011
15	9	"Highway Hijinks"	March 6, 2011
16	10	"Operation Moose Decoy"	March 13, 2011
17	11	"Anchorage Undercover"	March 20, 2011
18	12	"Vice Squad"	March 27, 2011
19	13	"Dazed and Confused"	March 27, 2011

=== Season 3 (2011–12) ===
No. overall	No. in season	Title	Original release date
20	1	"Beers & Bears"	December 4, 2011
This double-length episode includes 15 incidents such as the successful S&R for a person walking 15 miles across a frozen river from Bethel to her home, breaking up a fight in the Matanuska-Susitna ('Mat-Su') Valley, the trip to serve a warrant on a person who stole a police car from a municipal force, and a Wildlife Trooper's patrol to intercept ATV riders who destroyed salmon habitat.
21	2	"Grizzly Showdown"	December 5, 2011
22	3	"DUI on the 4th of July"	December 11, 2011
23	4	"Spring Break Crazy"	December 11, 2011
24	5	"Cowboy Fugitive"	February 18, 2011
25	6	"Madman Manhunt"	January 1, 2012
26	7	"Moose/Man Hunt"	January 8, 2012
27	8	"Gun N Hide"	January 15, 2012
28	9	"Midnight Poachers"	January 22, 2012
29	10	"Storm of the Century"	January 29, 2012
A Trooper races an oncoming storm to fly in and out of Kipnuk to gather evidence relating to a burglary. On a domestic violence call, a Trooper's response is interrupted when the storm destabilizes the ice road along the Kuskokwim River. A wanted person in the Mat-Su valley surrenders in order to find shelter from the storm in jail. A learning driver, trying to see a sign in the dark, slides into a ditch. Three incidents involve moose on the roads are presented.
30	11	"Warrant Wonderland"	February 5, 2012
Troopers respond to a house in Oscarville where a man with a gun had a hostage. A warrant served in the Mat-Su Valley resulted in discovery of drugs in the house. Wildlife Troopers are called when a young moose is snared accidentally in fencing wire, and where a moose enters a greenhouse. Both animals were returned to the wild successfully. The driver of a vehicle fled from a traffic stop, but was tracked and corralled by Trooper Dog.
31	12	"Helter Skelter Homicide"	February 12, 2012
32	13	"Alaskan Standoff"	February 26, 2012
33	14	"Village Vigilantes"	March 4, 2012

=== Season 4 (2012–13) ===
No. overall	No. in season	Title	Original release date
34	1	"Extreme Justice"	October 7, 2012
35	2	"Knife Fight"	October 7, 2012
36	3	"Alaska Chainsaw Massacre"	October 14, 2012
37	4	"Shotgun Showdown"	October 21, 2012
38	5	"Armed and Bootlegging"	October 28, 2012
39	6	"Bloody Warrior"	November 11, 2012
40	7	"Campground Crazies"	November 18, 2012
41	8	"Grizzly-pendence Day"	November 25, 2012
42	9	"Hostage Standoff"	December 9, 2012
43	10	"Armed & Squatting"	December 16, 2012
44	11	"Meth Dealer Manhunt"	December 23, 2012
45	12	"Son and a Gun"	December 30, 2012
46	13	"Drunk and Dangerous"	January 6, 2013
47	14	"Fatal Inferno"	January 14, 2013
48	15	"Crystal Meth Compound"	January 21, 2013
49	16	"Trooper Stalker"	January 28, 2013
50	17	"Deep Woods Standoff"	February 4, 2013
51	18	"Blacked Out & Belligerent"	February 11, 2013
52	19	"Hot Drugs, Icy Streets"	February 25, 2013
53	20	"Too Much Pot"	March 4, 2013
54	21	"Chopper Down"	March 11, 2013

=== Season 5 (2013) ===
No. overall	No. in season	Title	Original release date
55	1	"Trail of Blood"	September 15, 2013
56	2	"Loaded for Bear"	September 22, 2013
57	3	"Bear Aware"	September 29, 2013
58	4	"Lock 'N' Load Neighbors"	October 6, 2013
59	5	"Smell of Death"	October 13, 2013
60	6	"Burglars & Bears"	October 20, 2013
61	7	"Hammered on the Holiday"	November 3, 2013
62	8	"Carnival Chaos"	November 24, 2013
63	9	"Wildest Calls"	December 1, 2013
64	10	"Battling Demons"	December 1, 2013
65	11	"Frozen Justice"	December 8, 2013
66	12	"Shotgun Standoff"	December 8, 2013

=== Season 6 (2014) ===
No. overall	No. in season	Title	Original release date
67	1	"Guns, Cash, & Coke"	April 10, 2014
Troopers in Fairbanks pursue a speeding driver, who crashes and flees to the woods. On capture, he is carrying a lot of money. A warranted search of the vehicle discloses a loaded pistol and several containers of drugs. A trooper flies E. from Kotzebue to villages on the Kobuk River, where he arrests and transports several bootleggers. A bad black bear bursts into the smokers' shelter at the Seward max. security prison. The cub (4 mo. old) is easily enticed to eat bait, allowing him to be caged and transported to a wildlife refuge.
68	2	"Meth, Knives, & Spears"	April 17, 2014
69	3	"Burning Alaska"	April 24, 2014
70	4	"One in the Chamber"	May 1, 2014
71	5	"Crawl Space Capture"	May 8, 2014

=== Season 7 (2014) ===
No. overall	No. in season	Title	Original release date
72	1	"In the Line of Duty"	August 19, 2014
73	2	"Too Drunk To Drive"	August 26, 2014
74	3	"Cut in the Gut"	September 2, 2014
75	4	"Backwoods Bust"	September 9, 2014
76	5	"Head-On Collision"	September 16, 2014
77	6	"Cuff 'Em Countdown"	September 23, 2014

=== Season 8 (2015) ===
No. overall	No. in season	Title	Original release date	U.S. viewers (millions)
77	1	"Home Invasion Manhunt"	February 11, 2015	902,000
78	2	"Hairy Threat"	February 18, 2015	706,000
79	3	"Extreme Drug Busts"	February 18, 2015	551,000
80	4	"2-For-1 Takedown"	February 25, 2015	875,000
81	5	"Fearless on the Front Lines"	February 25, 2015	752,000
82	6	"Contraband and Kitchen Knives"	March 4, 2015	632,000
83	7	"Alaska's Most Wanted"	March 4, 2015	542,000
84	8	"NYPD to AST"	March 11, 2015	659,000
85	9	"Rock-Throwing Rampage"	March 18, 2015	833,000
Trooper from Palmer Post responds to neighborhood dispute involving rock throwing. Fairbanks trooper responds to domestic dispute where a drunk man assaults his sister. In Emmonak, a trooper investigating burglaries finds probationer who has violated conditions. Trooper in Matanuska-Susitna (Mat-Su) Valley assists pick-up driver to avoid frostbite, and a trooper from Mat-Su West post coordinates helicopter rescue of stranded snowmobilers.
86	10	"Dead-End Deranged"	March 25, 2015	906,000
Troopers track a fleeing felon through the woods near Wasilla after a high velocity vehicle chase ends with a car crash into the copse at the end of a dead-end road. A 'routine traffic stop' (10-36) finds an uncooperative driver, resulting in an arrest for DUI and the discovery of an undeclared, loaded pistol in the front seat of the vehicle. Trooper recruits at the Alaska Public Safety Training Academy in Sitka experience the early stages of hypothermia as they are led through a ten-minute activity in 43 °F (6 °C) sea water.
87	11	"Cliff Top Chaos"	April 1, 2015	N/A
Troopers rescue solo hiker from cliff face in Denali Park; helicopter ride W of Fairbanks to check bear bait stations.
88	12	"Drugged, Drunk, & Deranged"	April 8, 2015	N/A
Troopers go to the far reaches of the state to investigate a village store break-in. In Fairbanks, Troopers are called to respond to a repeat exposing violator at the local transfer station, and are faced with an aggressive confrontation.
89	13	"Asleep at the Wheel"	April 15, 2015	N/A
Follow the heroes one last time as they refuse to give up in the face of danger, chase down burglary nightmares, and save lives that are on the brink of death. Troopers brave the severe conditions and the volatile criminals that ravage the state, without blinking an eye.

=== Season 9 (2026) ===
No. overall	No. in season	Title	Original release date
90	1	"Summer Solstice"	January 7, 2026
91	2	"Wild and Dangerous"	January 14, 2026
92	3	"Lost in the Woods"	January 21, 2026
93	4	"Make Yourself Known"	January 28, 2026
94	5	"No Way Out"	February 4, 2026
95	6	"On the Run"	February 11, 2026
96	7	"Cold Truth and Consequences"	February 18, 2026
97	8	"One Bad Decision"	February 25, 2026
98	9	"Winter is Coming"	March 4, 2026
99	10	"Shots in the Snow"	March 11, 2026
