= HPD =

HPD may refer to:

- 4-Hydroxyphenylpyruvate dioxygenase
- Helsinki Police Department
- Hematoporphyrin, organic compound
- Histrionic personality disorder
- Honda Performance Development
- Hours per day, referred to working time
- HPD series of mines, landmines
- New York City Department of Housing Preservation and Development
- Croatian Climbing Society (Hrvatsko planinarsko društvo, HPD)

== Transport ==
- Haripad railway station, Kerala, India
- Haripur Band railway station, Punjab, Pakistan
- Harpenden railway station, Hertfordshire, England (National Rail station code)

== US police departments ==
- Hagerstown Police Department (Maryland)
- Hempstead Village Police Department, in New York
- Henderson Police Department in Nevada
- Hialeah Police Department, in Florida
- Hillsboro Police Department (Oregon)
- Hollywood Police Department (Florida)
- Holyoke Police Department, in Massachusetts
- Honolulu Police Department in Hawaii
- Hoonah Police Department, in Alaska
- Houston Police Department in Texas
