= Jean Frances Howard =

American law enforcement officer

Frances Howard
- Born: Jean Frances Howard 20th century United States
- Occupation: Law enforcement officer
- Known for: First female state trooper in Alaska

Jean Frances Howard (born 20th century) is an American law enforcement officer. She was the first female state trooper in Alaska and the "first unrestricted state officer in the United States". In 2009, she was named to the Alaska Women's Hall of Fame.

== Career ==
Howard was a dental assistant working in Grants Pass, Oregon, before she relocated to Alaska.

In February 1968, Howard was working as a dispatcher for the Alaska Department of Public Safety. Alaska required that a state trooper execute driving tests for individuals interested in becoming drivers. Due to the lack of state troopers available to provide the tests, Howard was made a "special" test administrator. Despite an added responsibility on top of her dispatcher position, Howard was still paid her original salary. After Alaska ratified the Equal Rights Amendment, she applied to become an Alaska state trooper.

She passed the required tests and on September 17, 1969, Howard became the first woman state trooper in Alaska. She also became "the first unrestricted state officer in the United States". Upon becoming a state trooper, Howard denied being a "women's rights advocate", and that "it just sorta happened", referring to her becoming a trooper.

== Legacy ==
In 2009, she was named to the Alaska Women's Hall of Fame.

== See also ==
- List of people from Alaska
- List of people from Oregon
