= Nell Scott =

American politician

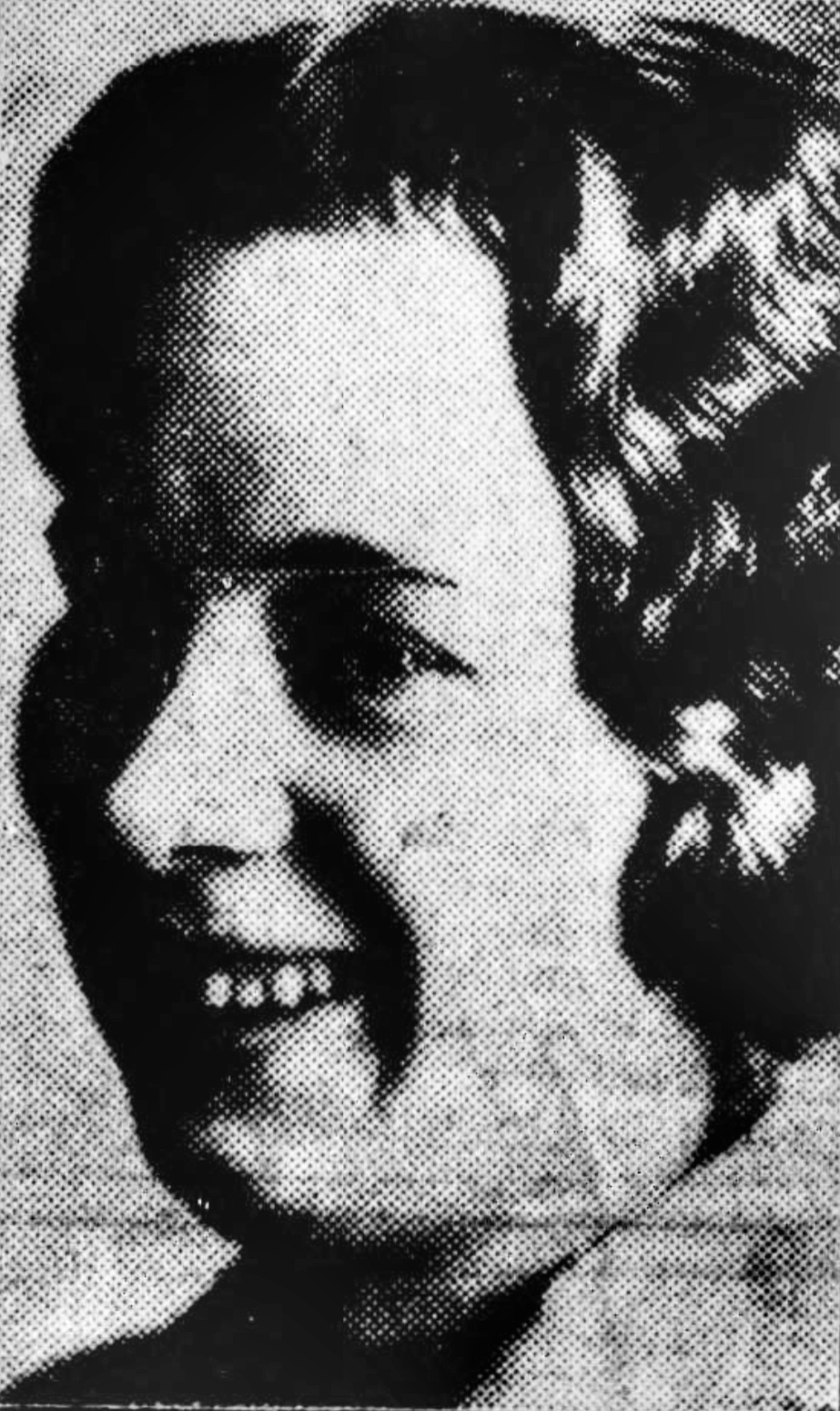

Nell Scott Chadwick was a Democratic politician from the U.S. territory of Alaska. She was the first woman to serve in the Alaska Territorial Legislature, serving a single term in the Alaska Territorial House of Representatives from 1937 to 1939.

== Family and early life ==
Nell Scott was born in Marengo, Michigan, November 9, 1900. She attended public schools in Seattle, Washington. Scott moved to Anchorage, Alaska from Seattle with her husband Dick Scott in 1923. While in Anchorage, she worked as a legal secretary. They relocated to Seldovia, Alaska when Dick was appointed Deputy United States Marshal in 1934.

== Political career ==
The 1936 election for the Territory of Alaska Legislature had two females; Scott on the Democratic ticket and Juanita Anderson on the Independent Party ticket, competing for one of 4 available seats in the 3rd District. Alaska in territorial days had only 4 legislative districts; the 3rd District covered an area roughly from the Copper River valley and Prince William Sound west to Bristol Bay and the Aleutian Islands. In this sprawling and (at the time) sparsely populated area, Scott campaigned by piloting her plane across her district and meeting people one on one. She won election and on January 11, 1937, Scott took a seat in the Territory of Alaska Legislature. Scott was the only representative from the 3rd District in this legislature not to hail from Anchorage. She served only one term, then moved back to Washington State for personal reasons.

== Later life, death, and legacy ==
Dick and Nell divorced, and Nell remarried and was later widowed.

The University of Alaska Fairbanks maintains a collection of her legislative papers.
