= Seldovia, Alaska =

City in Alaska, United States

Seldovia, Alaska Angagkitaqnuuq
- City
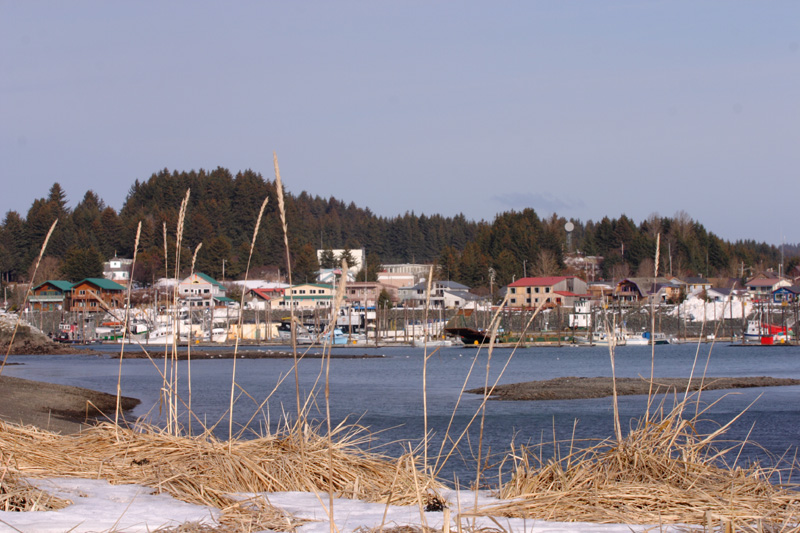
- Seldovia, Alaska

- Seal
- Motto: "Alaska's Best Kept Secret"
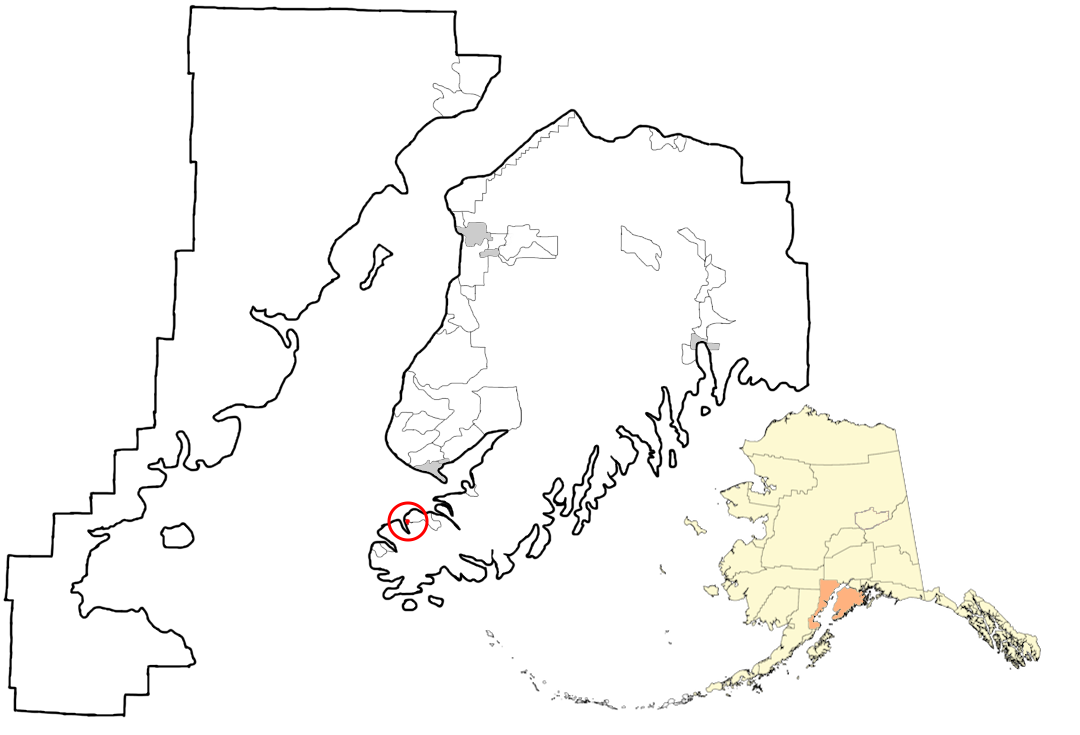
- Location in Kenai Peninsula Borough, Alaska
- Coordinates: 59°26′22″N 151°42′44″W
- Country: United States
- State: Alaska
- Borough: Kenai Peninsula
- Incorporated: May 7, 1945

Government
  - Mayor: Dean Lent
  - State senator: Gary Stevens (R)
  - State rep.: Sarah Vance (R)

Area
  - Total: 0.55 sq mi (1.42 km^{2})
  - Land: 0.39 sq mi (1.00 km^{2})
  - Water: 0.16 sq mi (0.42 km^{2})
- Elevation: 52 ft (16 m)

Population (2020)
  - Total: 235
  - Density: 607.5/sq mi (234.54/km^{2})
- Time zone: UTC-9 (Alaska (AKST))
  - Summer (DST): UTC-8 (AKDT)
- ZIP code: 99663
- Area code: 907
- FIPS code: 02-68340
- GNIS feature ID: 1413937
- Website: cityofseldovia.com

Seldovia (Alutiiq: Angagkitaqnuuq; Dena'ina: Angidahtnu; Russian: Селдовия) is a city in Kenai Peninsula Borough, Alaska, United States. As of the 2020 census, Seldovia had a population of 235. It is located along Kachemak Bay southwest of Homer. There is no road system connecting the town to other communities, so all travel to Seldovia is by airplane or boat.

The Alaska Native people of Seldovia make up approximately one quarter of the population and have ancestors of Aleut and Alutiiq (Sugpiaq) descent, as well as some Dena'ina.

== History ==
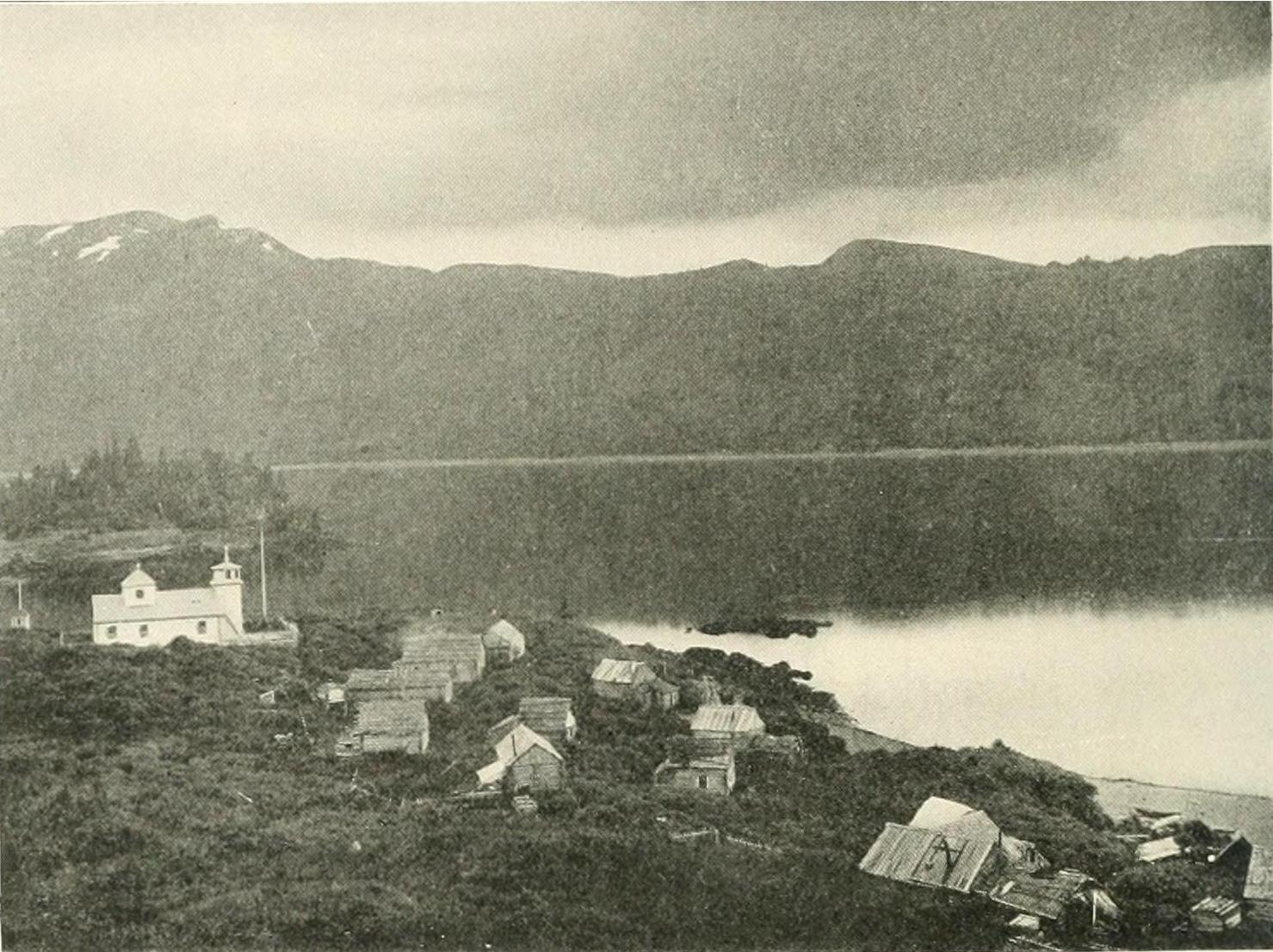
Seldovia as it appeared in the early 20th century.

The native residents are mixed Dena'ina Athabaskan Indian and Alutiiq (Sugpiaq) Eskimo. In 1787 or 1788 a Russian fur trade post named Aleksandrovskaia was established at today's Seldovia by hunting parties under Evstratii Ivanovich Delarov, of the Shelikhov-Golikov company, precursor of the Russian-American Company. Although there has been little definitive archeological evidence of human habitation at Seldovia prior to the 1800s, it is said the early Russian St. Nicholas Orthodox Church, started in 1820, was built on top of an older aboriginal Inuit village site. The town's original Russian name, Seldevoy, translates to "Herring Bay", as there was a significant herring population prior to rampant overfishing early in the 20th century.

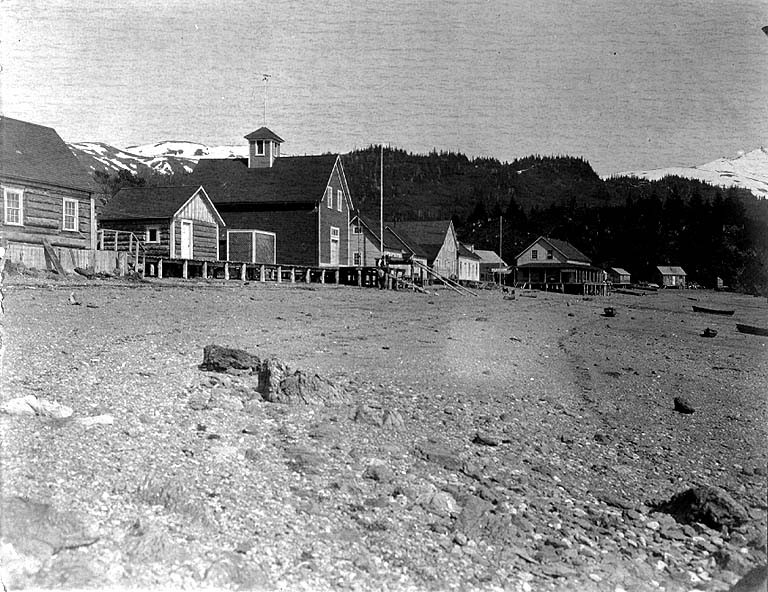
Main Street before the Old Boardwalk, June 1908

Until the development of a more complete road system in Alaska, Seldovia was an important "first stop" for ships sailing from Seward, Kodiak and other points outside Cook Inlet. At one time Seldovia was home to over 2,000 residents, but today fewer than 300 persons reside year round.

The town was one of many communities along the shores of Cook Inlet, noted for having one of the most severe tidal movements in North America. Similar to the dramatic tides of Bay of Fundy, the Cook Inlet's waters prior to 1964 would rise or fall 26 feet every six hours during the peak tides.

After the Good Friday earthquake on March 27, 1964, which registered 9.2 on the moment magnitude scale, the surrounding land mass dropped six feet. Seldovia's "boardwalk" before the earthquake was thick wooden plank and piling, and the town's main street was built almost entirely along the waterfront. Most of the community's businesses, and many homes were similarly constructed upon pilings on either side of this "street". The sudden sinking of the land caused higher tides, peaking at 32 feet, to completely submerge the boardwalk and flood the homes and businesses along the waterfront.

The waterfront was rebuilt (known at the time as "urban renewal") using fill from Cap's Hill, which was demolished to rebuild the town on higher ground. There is only one small portion of the boardwalk left; this section of the boardwalk was built decades after the original boardwalk and it is known to the townfolk as "the new boardwalk", even though it is now the only boardwalk. The original boardwalk is completely gone, destroyed during the urban renewal process, along with many homes and businesses.

Seldovia has been home to many industries, including fox farming, berry picking and commercial fishing, including king crab fishing. Logging and mining have also featured in local history. Today charter boats keep busy bringing the visiting sport fishermen to the fishing grounds of Kachemak Bay and other nearby waters.

== Demographics ==
Historical population
Census	Pop.	Note	%±
1880	74		—
1890	99		33.8%
1900	149		50.5%
1910	173		16.1%
1920	258		49.1%
1930	379		46.9%
1940	410		8.2%
1950	437		6.6%
1960	460		5.3%
1970	437		−5.0%
1980	479		9.6%
1990	316		−34.0%
2000	286		−9.5%
2010	255		−10.8%
2020	235		−7.8%
U.S. Decennial Census

Seldovia first appeared on the 1880 U.S. Census as the unincorporated villages of Seldovia and Ostrovki. Of the 74 residents, 38 were Creole (Mixed Russian and Native) and 36 were Inuit. In 1890, it returned as Seldovia, and reported 99 residents, of which 83 were Native and 16 Creole. It has reported in every successive census. It formally incorporated in 1945.

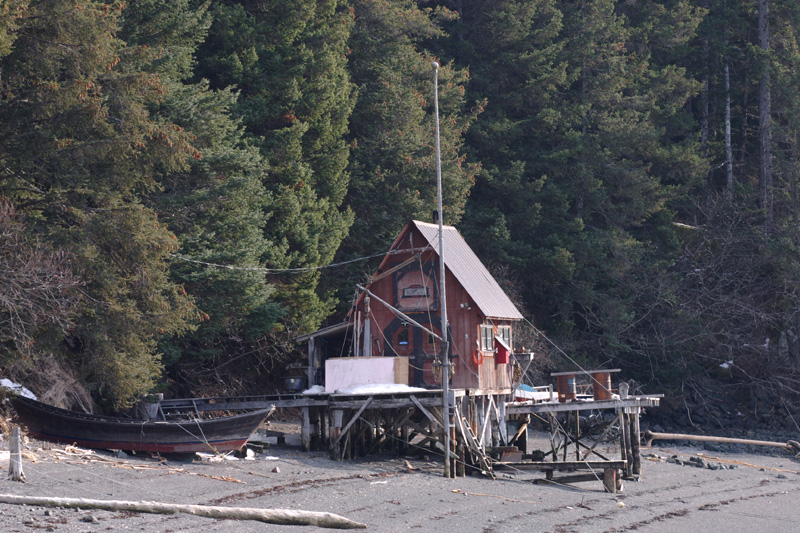
Schooner Beach shop.

=== 2020 census ===
As of the 2020 census, Seldovia had a population of 235. The median age was 53.5 years. 21.3% of residents were under the age of 18 and 31.1% of residents were 65 years of age or older. For every 100 females there were 106.1 males, and for every 100 females age 18 and over there were 107.9 males age 18 and over.

0.0% of residents lived in urban areas, while 100.0% lived in rural areas.

There were 115 households in Seldovia, of which 27.0% had children under the age of 18 living in them. Of all households, 47.0% were married-couple households, 29.6% were households with a male householder and no spouse or partner present, and 19.1% were households with a female householder and no spouse or partner present. About 31.3% of all households were made up of individuals and 18.2% had someone living alone who was 65 years of age or older.

There were 213 housing units, of which 46.0% were vacant. The homeowner vacancy rate was 9.8% and the rental vacancy rate was 3.0%.

Racial composition as of the 2020 census
Race	Number	Percent
White	156	66.4%
Black or African American	0	0.0%
American Indian and Alaska Native	27	11.5%
Asian	4	1.7%
Native Hawaiian and Other Pacific Islander	0	0.0%
Some other race	2	0.9%
Two or more races	46	19.6%
Hispanic or Latino (of any race)	6	2.6%

=== 2010 census ===
As of the census of 2010, there were 255 people, 121 households, and 66 families residing in the city. The population density was 668.6 inhabitants per square mile (258.1/km^{2}). There were 218 housing units at an average density of 571.6 per square mile (220.7/km^{2}). The racial makeup of the city was 72.5% White, 1.2% Black or African American, 13.7% Native American, 1.2% Asian, 0.0% Pacific Islander, 0.0% from other races, and 11.4% from two or more races. 3.9% of the population were Hispanic or Latino of any race.

There were 121 households, out of which 19.8% had children under the age of 18 living with them, 44.6% were married couples living together, 6.6% had a female householder with no husband present, 3.3% had a male householder with no wife present, and 45.5% were non-families. 35.5% of all households were made up of individuals, and 12.4% had someone living alone who was 65 years of age or older. The average household size was 2.11 and the average family size was 2.67.

In the city, the age distribution of the population shows 20.0% under the age of 18, 3.6% from 18 to 24, 21.2% from 25 to 44, 37.2% from 45 to 64, and 18.1% who were 65 years of age or older. The median age was 48.2 years. For every 100 females, there were 104 males. For every 100 females age 18 and over, there were 114.7 males.

The median income for a household in the city was $50,313, and the median income for a family was $68,750. Males had a median income of $61,875 versus $21,667 for females. The per capita income for the city was $30,754. About 1.7% of families and 8.7% of the population were below the poverty line, including 2.2% of those under the age of eighteen and 1.9% of those 65 or over.

== Geography ==
Climate chart for Seldovia

Seldovia is on the Kenai Peninsula on the south shore of Kachemak Bay opposite Homer. The community is located in the Seldovia Recording District.

Seldovia sea level change is -9.96 mm/yr, over the last 50 years it is about -19.6 inches or -1.6 ft.

According to the United States Census Bureau, the city of Seldovia has a total area of 0.6 square miles (1.6 km^{2}), of which, 0.4 square miles (1.0 km^{2}) of it is land and 0.2 square miles (0.52 km^{2}) of it (33.33%) is water.

=== Climate ===
Seldovia has snowy winters and brief dry summers (Koppen Dsc).

Climate data for Seldovia (1991–2020 normals, extremes 1997–present)
Month	Jan	Feb	Mar	Apr	May	Jun	Jul	Aug	Sep	Oct	Nov	Dec	Year
Record high °F (°C)	59 (15)	51 (11)	62 (17)	66 (19)	71 (22)	77 (25)	85 (29)	80 (27)	66 (19)	69 (21)	59 (15)	59 (15)	85 (29)
Mean maximum °F (°C)	43.8 (6.6)	43.0 (6.1)	44.5 (6.9)	52.5 (11.4)	62.7 (17.1)	68.8 (20.4)	72.5 (22.5)	70.2 (21.2)	61.8 (16.6)	55.8 (13.2)	47.2 (8.4)	45.8 (7.7)	73.6 (23.1)
Mean daily maximum °F (°C)	30.8 (−0.7)	33.5 (0.8)	35.5 (1.9)	43.3 (6.3)	51.2 (10.7)	58.1 (14.5)	61.8 (16.6)	61.5 (16.4)	54.7 (12.6)	45.4 (7.4)	36.1 (2.3)	32.9 (0.5)	45.4 (7.4)
Daily mean °F (°C)	25.8 (−3.4)	28.4 (−2.0)	29.5 (−1.4)	36.9 (2.7)	44.3 (6.8)	50.9 (10.5)	55.4 (13.0)	54.7 (12.6)	48.6 (9.2)	39.7 (4.3)	31.5 (−0.3)	28.2 (−2.1)	39.5 (4.2)
Mean daily minimum °F (°C)	20.8 (−6.2)	23.3 (−4.8)	23.5 (−4.7)	30.6 (−0.8)	37.3 (2.9)	43.7 (6.5)	49.0 (9.4)	47.9 (8.8)	42.4 (5.8)	34.1 (1.2)	26.9 (−2.8)	23.5 (−4.7)	33.6 (0.9)
Mean minimum °F (°C)	4.7 (−15.2)	9.0 (−12.8)	9.7 (−12.4)	20.0 (−6.7)	29.9 (−1.2)	36.0 (2.2)	42.0 (5.6)	39.9 (4.4)	31.8 (−0.1)	23.8 (−4.6)	13.8 (−10.1)	8.6 (−13.0)	1.7 (−16.8)
Record low °F (°C)	−7 (−22)	−4 (−20)	0 (−18)	6 (−14)	24 (−4)	29 (−2)	37 (3)	33 (1)	27 (−3)	16 (−9)	1 (−17)	1 (−17)	−7 (−22)
Average precipitation inches (mm)	3.87 (98)	3.68 (93)	3.19 (81)	2.80 (71)	1.15 (29)	1.15 (29)	1.58 (40)	2.71 (69)	4.09 (104)	4.60 (117)	4.83 (123)	6.74 (171)	40.39 (1,026)
Average precipitation days (≥ 0.01 inch)	15.1	14.6	13.3	13.2	11.7	10.9	13.1	15.4	18.3	18.1	16.8	18.0	178.5
Source: NOAA

== Economy ==
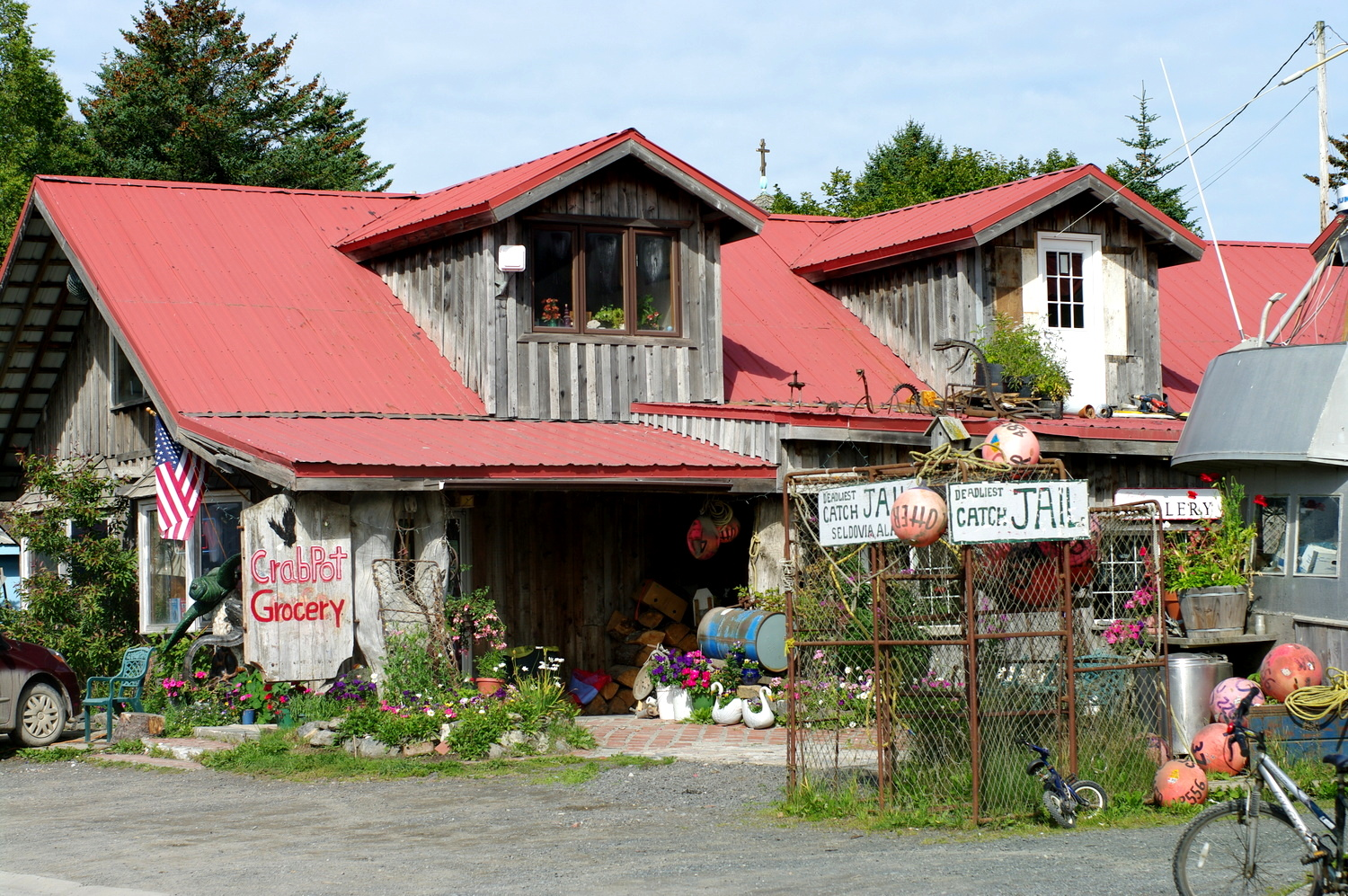
The Crab Pot Grocery.

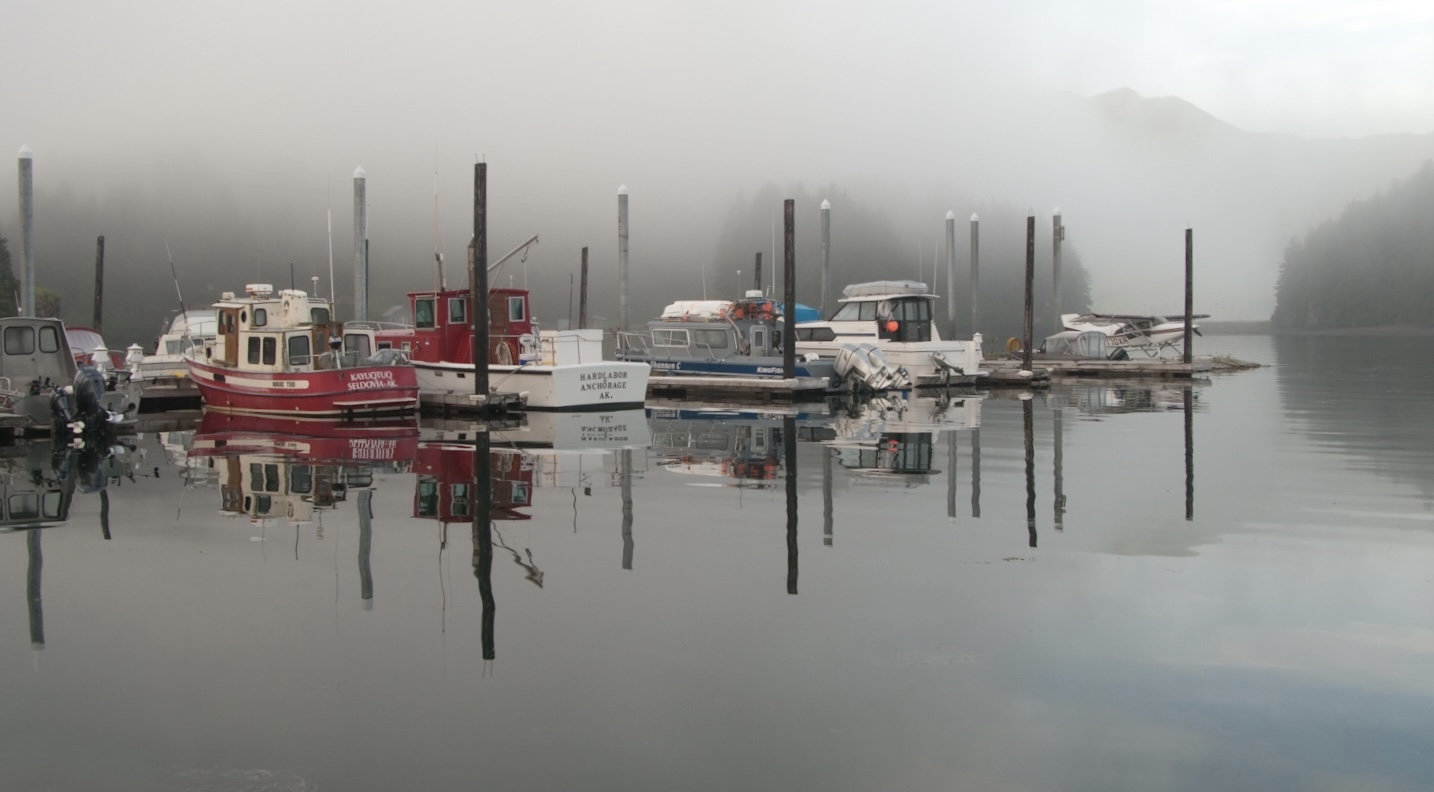
Fishing boats docked in the Seldovia harbor on a foggy day.

The school, Seldovia Village Tribe, City, and commercial fishing related businesses are the dominant employers in town.

== Education ==
The Susan B. English Grade K-12 School, opened on August 30, 1972. The girls' volleyball team won the 2002 State Championship in the 1A, 2A, 3A West division. The boys basketball team won the state championship in the 1A division in 2015.

== Notable people ==
- Nell Scott (c. 1901), the first woman elected to Alaska's territorial legislature
- Dana Stabenow (born 1952), writer
- Carl H. Marrs (born 1949), Chief Executive Officer of Old Harbor Native Corporation and advocate in Juneau and Washington, D.C., on various projects.Old Harbor
- Senator Ted Stevens, Honored as Seldovia's Old Crab and visited on the 4th of July.

== In fiction ==
In children adventure book Pugs of the Frozen North by Philip Reeve and Sarah McIntyre, name, description, and visual depiction of the town Snowdovia is based on that of Seldovia.

A chapter book for elementary students, Seldovia Sam and the Very Large Clam written by Susan Woodward Springer, is based on the adventures of fictional a boy and his family in Seldovia. There are four books in this series, including Seldovia Sam and the Wildfire Escape; Seldovia Sam and the Sea Otter Rescue, and Seldovia Sam and the Blueberry Bear.

The Great Alone by Kristin Hannah takes place primarily in a fictional Alaskan town on the Kenai Peninsula, near Homer, named Keneq. The Allbright homestead is said to be located across from Kachemak Bay, though, and anyone who has spent time on the peninsula will note that Hannah's descriptions strongly resemble the layout and geography of Seldoiva.

== See also ==
- Jakolof Bay, Alaska and Seldovia Village, Alaska, populated places located adjacent to Seldovia but outside of its city limits
- Seldovia Police Department
