= Hoonah Police Department =

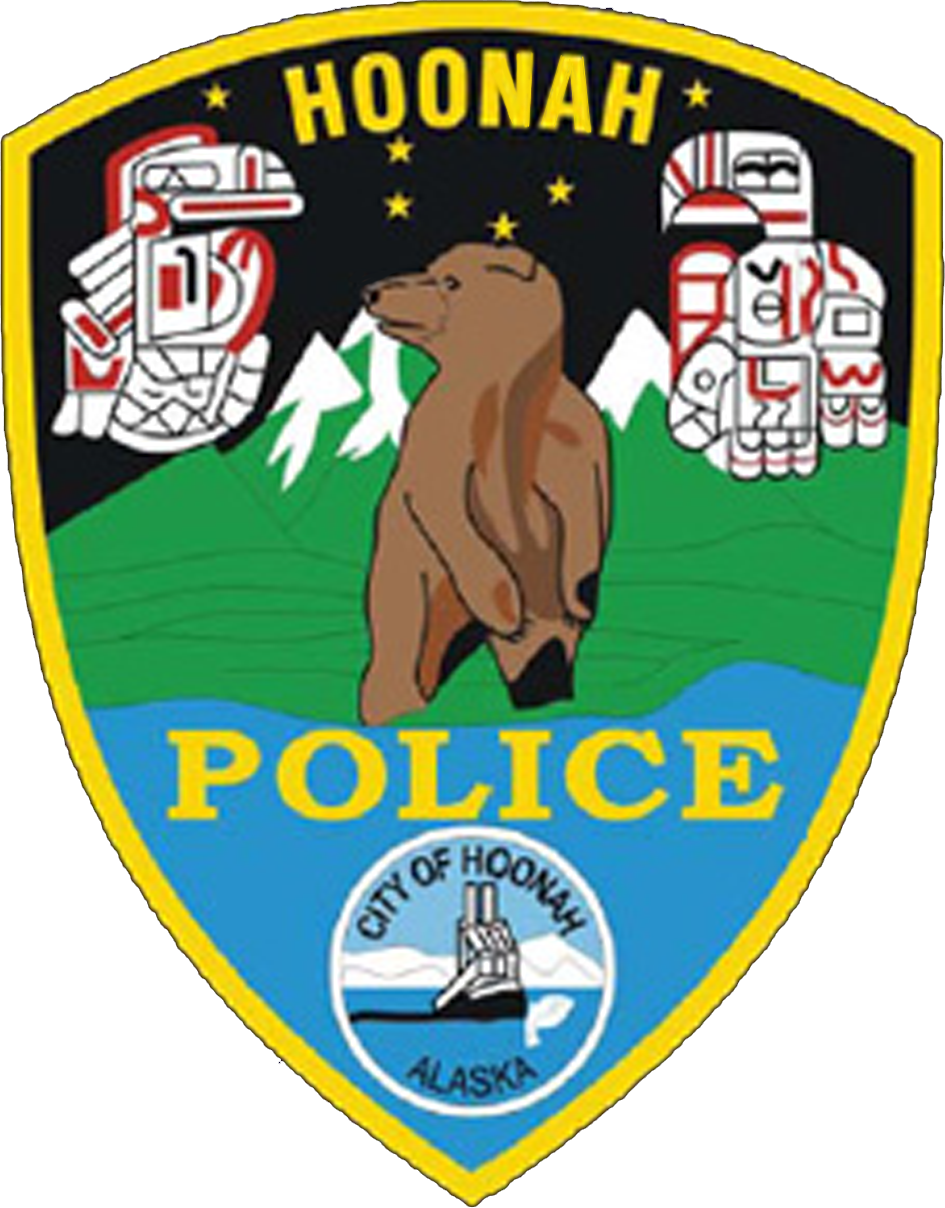
- Patch of the Hoonah Police Department
- Abbreviation: HPD

Jurisdictional structure
- Operations jurisdiction: Hoonah, Alaska, USA
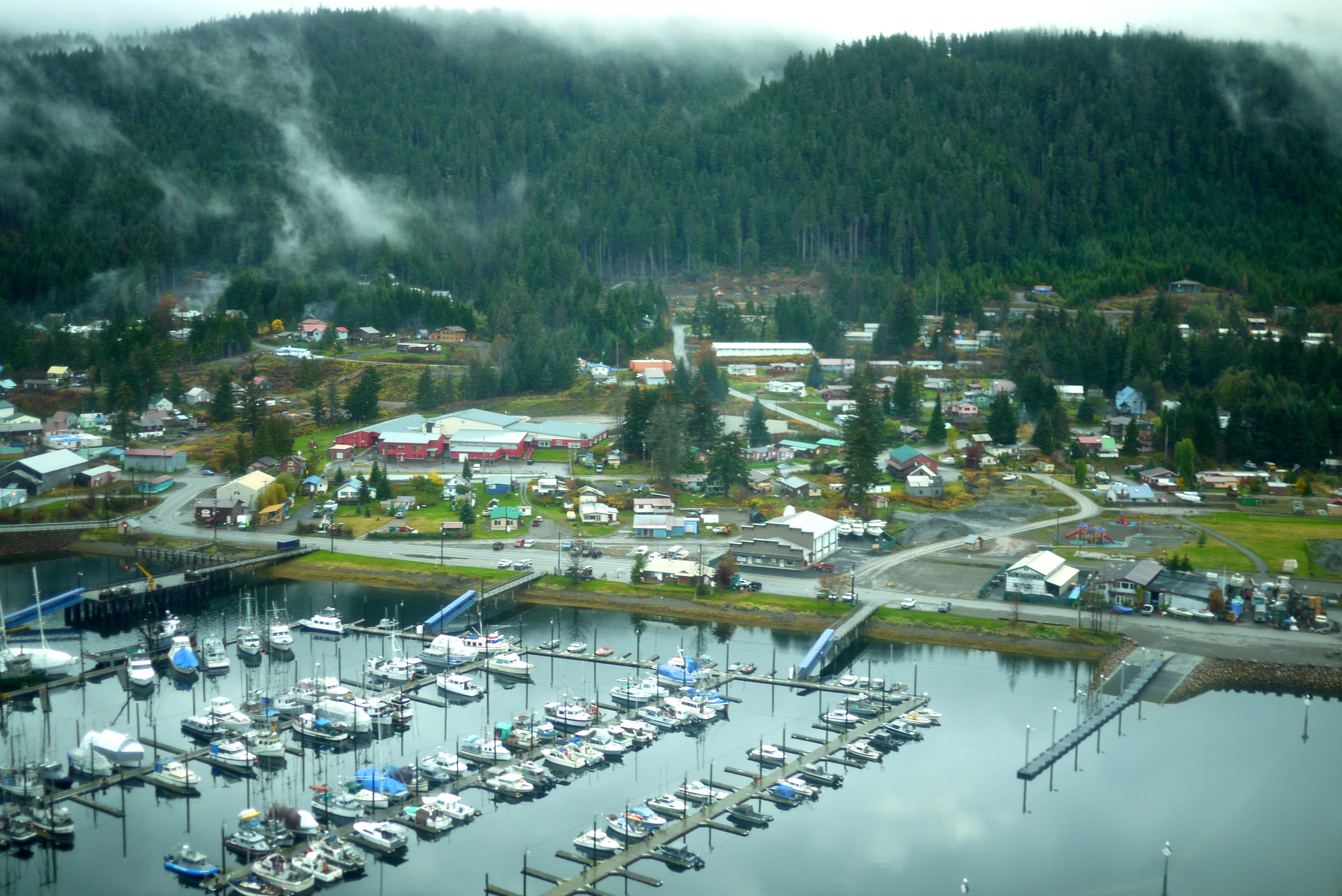
- HPD primary jurisdiction
- Area: 7.13 square miles (18.5 km^{2})
- Population: 931
- General nature: Local civilian police

Operational structure
- Headquarters: 379 Raven Drive Hoonah, Alaska
- Agency executive: Eric Hurtado, Chief of Police

The Hoonah Department of Public Safety - Police Services (HPD) is the only municipal police agency on Chichagof Island in Southeast Alaska. It is a full-service municipal police department for the City of Hoonah, an Alaskan First-Class City of 875 residents. HPD also provides police protection to surrounding areas on the local road system and operates a short-term detention facility.

The department has a unique badge, with a standing brown bear and the city's seal on its chest. The department also has a distinct shoulder patch depicting an erect grizzly bear, the Pacific Ocean, and snowcapped mountains, along with totem images from Tlingit culture.

== History and structure ==
The department was first established in the 1940s, during World War II. It grew over the years from a part-time Chief to up to five officers during the logging era which peaked in the late 1980s.

The department has a Director of Public Safety/Police Chief, three paid officers and two reserve officers. Civilian employees include a full-time Administrative Assistant and Supervising 911 Dispatcher, two full-time 911 dispatchers, several part-time 911 dispatchers. All dispatchers also serve as jail guards as needed. Dispatch is staffed around the clock and also dispatches for all divisions of Hoonah Public Safety (Police, EMS, & Fire).

Officers are also Tri-certified due to the unique remote area. Officers must work as Firefighters and EMT's. The department has a volunteer Fire and EMS unit that is supervised by volunteer team leaders. The Police Chief serves as the Public Safety Director and oversees all public safety functions.

HPD Reserve police officers serve as needed to supplement the full-time staff and during special or emergency events. HPD has a computer terminal link to the Alaska Public Safety Information Network (APSIN), Alaska's arm of the National Crime Information Center (NCIC). The population of Hoonah typically swells to over 1400 in warm weather months (May through September) with the arrival of commercial and recreational fishermen, recreational boaters, hikers, hunters, seasonal construction workers, and cruise ship passengers.

Cruise Ship visitors range from 250,000 - 400,000 per year.

== Police station ==
The station has two cellblocks capable of holding low-risk and high-risk prisoners, females, juveniles, and Title 47 holds (Alaska Statute for mental health or temporarily disabled due to alcohol intake). The jail is generally a pre-trial holding facility, but can keep prisoners for up to two weeks. Persons held at the HPD jail for convictions are usually "weekenders," persons convicted of less-serious offenses and who are sentenced to short terms in jail, especially on weekends. Dangerous, convicted or long-term hold prisoners are transported by HPD officers to Juneau's Lemon Creek Correctional Center.

== Officer duties ==
HPD officers are on-duty or on-call 24 hours a day, seven days a week. Officers patrol and answer calls for service in and near the City of Hoonah and along 300 miles of unpaved roads leading to various recreational areas of the nearby Tongass National Forest in warm weather months (May through September).

== Line of duty deaths ==
Two Hoonah Police Officers have been killed in the line of duty. Sergeant Anthony Michael "Tony" Wallace, 32, He was hearing impaired and Officer Matthew Dean "Matt" Tokuoka, 39, were both shot and killed in an ambush on Front Street on Saturday night, August 28, 2010, in the presence of their families. A man with a history of arrest contacts with the two officers was charged with having opened fire with a rifle as Sergeant Wallace spoke to Officer Tokuoka and his family. Sergeant Wallace was shot in the leg and chest, penetrating his body armor. Officer Tokuoka, who was off-duty, came to Sergeant Wallace's aid and was also shot twice in the chest. Responding officers and a firefighter removed the fallen officers to safety, where Hoonah EMS transported both to the Hoonah Clinic Emergency Room. Officer Tokuoka died approximately forty five minutes later. Sergeant Wallace was flown by a US Coast Guard rescue helicopter to Bartlett Hospital in Juneau, where died while undergoing emergency surgery several hours after the shooting.

Responding Hoonah, Wrangel, and Alaska State Trooper personnel contained the scene until SWAT personnel from the Juneau Police Department, US Forest Service Law Enforcement, and Alaska State Troopers arrived the following morning. Additional troopers arrived the next day, along with US Bureau of Alcohol, Tobacco, Firearms, and Explosives (ATF) agents. The suspect, John Marvin Jr., 45, of Hoonah, surrendered the next day after being teargassed. He was charged with the murders of Sergeant Wallace and Officer Tokuoka.

Sergeant Wallace was a former All-American college wrestler and had served with HPD for over three years. He was survived by his 12-year-old daughter, his mother, several siblings, and extended family. Officer Tokuoka, a former USMC boxer and special operations Marine had served HPD for eighteen months as both a reserve and active officer. He was survived by his wife, two daughters, two sons, his father, several siblings, and extended family. The murders of the two officers in the agency with four full-time officers was the largest per capita loss of life by any law enforcement agency in Alaska law enforcement history and triggered the largest deployment of law enforcement personnel in rural Alaska history.

The funeral of the two fallen officers was the largest police funeral in Alaska history and the biggest gathering ever in Hoonah history. It was held in the Hoonah High School gym and attended by Alaska Governor Sean Parnell and US Senator Lisa Murkowski, along with over 1100 people, including local, state and federal law enforcement officers from across Alaska, along with law enforcement from Canada and the lower forty eight states. The State of Alaska provided a free ferry to get the officers' remains to Hoonah for the funeral and to bring persons attending the ceremony to Hoonah.

Officer Tokuoka was posthumously awarded the Police Medal of Honor and Sergeant Wallace was posthumously awarded the Police Distinguished Service Award. Both officers were also posthumously awarded Police Purple Hearts. The Hoonah City Council proclaimed the day of the funeral, September eighth as Officer Matthew Tokuoka and Sergeant Anthony Wallace Memorial Day.

== Leadership ==
The current Chief is Chief Eric Hurtado. He has been in law enforcement since 1988 where he began his career in a large agency with over 500 sworn.

Previous HPD Chiefs in recent years have included Rick Groshong, Corey Rowley, John Millan, Jeff Hankla, Hugh Miller, and Robert "Bob" Beasley and Kelly Swihart.

== See also ==
List of law enforcement agencies in Alaska
