= Sitka Police Department =

- Abbreviation: SPD

Jurisdictional structure
- Operations jurisdiction: Sitka, Alaska, USA
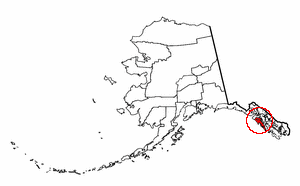
- Map of Sitka Police Department's jurisdiction
- Area: 4,815.14 square miles (12,471.2 km^{2})
- Population: 8,458 (2020)
- General nature: Local civilian police

Operational structure
- Headquarters: 304 Lake St, Rm 102, Sitka, Alaska
- Police Officers: 23
- Civilians: 10
- Agency executive: Robert Baty, Chief of Police

Website
- Sitka Police

The Sitka Police Department (SPD) is a law enforcement agency which serves Sitka, Alaska. It is responsible for maintaining public safety, enforcing laws, and providing emergency response services within the jurisdiction. The department operates under the leadership of the Chief of Police and works in coordination with other local, state, and federal agencies.

SPD's duties include patrol operations, criminal investigations, traffic enforcement, and community policing initiatives. The department also manages the city’s emergency dispatch center and provides support for public safety programs aimed at crime prevention and community engagement.

== Description ==
The jurisdiction of the Sitka Police Department covers the entire City and Borough of Sitka. The City and Borough of Sitka is considered to be the second largest incorporated city by area in the U.S., but most of Sitka's Borough is uninhabited and therefore the majority of police matters are contained to the west side of Baranof Island where the 8,458 (2020) citizens of Sitka reside.

Operate a 24-hour dispatch and records center, which is responsible for fire and emergency dispatch, as well as a community jail facility. Operations division consists of Investigations, Patrol, Emergency Response Vessel operators and Animal Control. The Chief is Robert Baty. He succeeds former chief Jeff Ankerfelt, who retired 2019 year.

== Rank structure ==
Title	Insignia
Chief	
Lieutenant	
Sergeant	
Detective	
Officer	

== Fallen members ==
Since the establishment of the Sitka Police Department, one officer has been killed in the line of duty.

Rank	Officer	Date of death	Details
Officer	Doris Wayne Barber	July 28, 1960	Gunfire

== See also ==
- List of law enforcement agencies in Alaska
- List of law enforcement officers killed in the line of duty in the United States
