= List of law enforcement agencies in Alaska =

This is a list of law enforcement agencies in the state of Alaska.

According to the US Bureau of Justice Statistics' 2008 Census of State and Local Law Enforcement Agencies, the state had 50 law enforcement agencies employing 1,298 sworn police officers, about 189 for each 100,000 residents.

== State agencies ==
- Alaska Department of Commerce, Community, and Economic Development
  - Alaska Alcohol and Marijuana Control Office
- Alaska Department of Corrections
- Alaska Department of Environmental Conservation
- Alaska Department of Public Safety
  - Alaska State Crime Lab
  - Alaska State Fire Marshal's Office
  - Alaska State Troopers
  - Alaska Wildlife Troopers
  - Alaska Court Services Officers
  - Village Public Safety Officer Program
- Alaska State Parks
  - Alaska State Park Rangers
- Alaska Commercial Vehicle Enforcement
- Fairbanks International Airport Police and Fire Department
- Ted Stevens Anchorage International Airport Police and Fire Department

== City agencies ==
- Adak Police Department
- Anchorage Police Department
- Angoon Police Department
- Bethel Police Department
- Cordova Police Department
- Craig Police Department
- Dillingham Police Department
- Fairbanks Police Department
- Fort Yukon Police Department
- Galena Police Department
- Haines Police Department
- Homer Police Department
- Hoonah Police Department
- Hooper Bay Police Department
- Juneau Police Department
- Kake Police Department
- Kenai Police Department
- Ketchikan Police Department
- King Cove Police Department
- Klawock Police Department
- Kodiak Police Department
- Kotzebue Police Department
- Metlakatla Police Department
- Nome Police Department
- North Pole Police Department
- Palmer Police Department
- Petersburg Police Department
- Pilot Station Police Department
- Saint Mary's Police Department
- Seldovia Police Department
- Seward Police Department
- Sitka Police Department
- Skagway Police Department
- Soldotna Police Department
- Valdez Police Department
- Wasilla Police Department
- Whittier Police Department
- Wrangell Police Department

== Department of Public Safety ==
- Chignik Bay Department of Public Safety
- Saint Paul Department of Public Safety
- Sand Point Department of Public Safety
- Tanana Department of Public Safety
- Unalakleet Department of Public Safety
- Unalaska Department of Public Safety
- Yakutat Department of Public Safety

== Other agencies ==
- Alaska Railroad Corporation Police Department
- Office of the United States Marshal for the District of Alaska

== University & college agencies ==
- University of Alaska Anchorage Police Department
- University of Alaska Fairbanks Police Department
