= Jakolof Bay, Alaska =

Unincorporated community in the state of Alaska, United States

Coordinates: 59°26′49″N 151°30′37″W

Jakolof Bay is an unincorporated community in Kenai Peninsula Borough, Alaska, United States. As of the 2000 Census, the population was 40. The location of this community is south of the city of Seldovia, across Kachemak Bay from Homer. Jakolof Bay is connected by road with Seldovia but neither community is otherwise accessible by road to the outside world. There is a rough gravel airstrip on the beach which is underwater during some high tides. Jakolof Bay was recognized as a census-designated place in the 1980 Census.

== Demographics ==
Historical population
Census	Pop.	Note	%±
1980	36		—
1990	28		−22.2%
U.S. Decennial Census

Jakolof Bay first appeared on the 1980 U.S. Census as a census-designated place (CDP) and again in 1990. It was dissolved in 2000, with most of the area west of the bay placed within the new CDP of Seldovia Village, while the areas north, south and east of the bay are not in any CDP.
