= Anchorage Police Department =

Police department in Alaska

Coordinates: 61°10′45″N 149°48′22″W

- Common name: Anchorage Police
- Abbreviation: APD

Agency overview
- Formed: 1920
- Employees: 516

Jurisdictional structure
- Operations jurisdiction: Anchorage, Alaska, United States
- Map of Anchorage Police Department's jurisdiction
- Area: 159 square miles (410 km^{2})
- Population: 279,671

Operational structure
- Headquarters: 716 West Fourth Avenue; Anchorage, Alaska 99501
- Sworn officers: 413 (as of 2021)
- Support staff members: 161 (as of 2021)
- Agency executive: Sean Case, Chief of Police
- Units: List: Uniform Patrol; Detective/Investigations; Homicide Response Team; Assault/Robbery; Hostage Negotiations; K-9; Traffic; School Resource; S.W.A.T.; Bomb Squad; Crime Prevention; Crisis Intervention; Cyber Crimes

Website
- www.muni.org/apd1/apd911.cfm

The Anchorage Police Department (APD) is the police department serving the Municipality of Anchorage in Alaska. APD is responsible for police services for the entirety of the Municipality of Anchorage, including the communities of Eagle River, Chugiak, and the native village of Eklutna to the north, and communities of Indian, Portage and Rainbow to the south (the only exception of the small community of Girdwood which receives police service from the Whittier Police Department). Serving Alaska's largest city, APD is the only "metropolitan" agency, and is the largest municipal police force in Alaska.

== History ==
The city of Anchorage had a modest beginning as a tent city on the banks of Ship Creek and was originally called Ship Creek Landing. Law enforcement for the Alaska Territory had been in the hands of the United States Marshals. On November 23, 1920, Anchorage was incorporated as a first class city.

On December 22, 1920, the city council appointed John J. Sturgus to begin as Chief of Police on January 1, 1921, at a salary of $200 a month. He was a one-man police department until his death just six weeks later. He was shot and killed with his own gun on February 20, 1921. Sturgus's murderer was never apprehended. The city council voted to offer a $1,000 reward, the mayor pledged an additional $250, and all other council members and clerk pledged $100 each, bringing the total reward to $1,950. His death was to be APD's first unsolved homicide. Many men served as chief during Anchorage's violent territorial years. In 1926, the council began hiring night watchmen during the long winter months of October through March. On June 19, 1935, the council received a petition signed by seven property owners to provide a 24-hour police force.

The department got along on foot with the occasional use of a citizen's borrowed car and the use of taxis until the city decided to purchase a vehicle. In August 1930, APD got its first police vehicle: a used Ford for $63.75. It was not until April 1941 that the council voted to purchase the department's first new police car—a 1941 Dodge 4-door sedan, completely equipped with siren and spotlight, for $1,401.80.

In the late 1930s and early 1940s, the military began building bases and the population of Anchorage began to grow, jumping from 4,229 in 1939 to 30,060 in 1950.

In 1975, the City of Anchorage merged with the Greater Anchorage Area Borough (GAAB) to form the Municipality of Anchorage. Though APD contracted police services to the Borough, "Spenard officers" had to use separate ordinances and accounting systems in their duties. APD's service area increased from 31 square miles (80 km^{2}) to 110 square miles (280 km^{2}).

Today, the Anchorage Police Department is the largest police department in Alaska, serving a population of approximately 275,000 in a service area encompassing 159 square miles (410 km^{2}), most of the populated portions of the municipality's 1,961.1 square miles (5,079 km^{2}). The main exceptions are the Turnagain Arm communities of (from north to south) Rainbow, Indian, Bird, Girdwood, and portage.

There are several specialized units including Canine, Special Weapons and Tactics (SWAT), Homicide Response Team, Hostage Negotiations Team, Bomb Team, School Resource Officer (SRO), Crisis Intervention Team (CIT), Identification Section, Data System Section, Records Section, Traffic and Crime Prevention Unit. APD's Homicide Response Team has been nationally recognized for their techniques and solvability rate. APD operates high-profile undercover and sting-type counter-vice operations throughout Anchorage to suppress and deter vice, narcotics, prostitution, organized crime and quality of life crimes.

The department works closely with Alaska DOT Airport Police at Ted Stevens Anchorage International Airport, the University of Alaska Police, and the Alaska State Troopers, who are headquartered in Anchorage. Due to the unique nature of Alaska, with massive tracts of federal lands and its proximity to foreign nations like Russia which shares a nautical border, APD also works closely with various federal law enforcement agencies, such as the FBI, US Customs and Border Protection and US Secret Service. With a large joint US Army-Air Force Base (Joint Base Elemendorf-Richardson) in its boundaries, APD works closely with the US Army and Air Force military police, Security Police, Defense Dept Police and the criminal investigation agencies, Criminal Investigation Division (CID) of the US Army and Office of Special Investigations (OSI) of the Air Force. The US Coast Guard also patrols waterways in the city limits which are popular with boaters. The US Forest Service law enforcement division also patrols USFS lands that abut Anchorage.

The department's current chief is an alumnus of West Anchorage High School, the University of Alaska and the U.S. Marines. Justin Doll ascended to the office in June 2017. Since his appointment he has opened a new Anchorage Police Department Headquarters Building in downtown Anchorage and secured Federal Grant funding to increase patrol units and secure the main highway corridor between the Matanuska Susitna Valley and Anchorage. The Anchorage Police Department's website claims that "APD has come a long way since those early Territorial years" and then states that, nevertheless, "the men and women of the Anchorage Police Department are proud of their heritage and remain dedicated to protect and serve their community."

== Academy and Training ==
APD is the only municipal police agency in Alaska to operate its own basic police officer academy which is certified by the Alaska Police Standards Council. APD trainees attend the academy four days per week (0700–1800 hours) for about six months before moving on to Field Training. Seats in this academy are reserved for APD hires, but are occasionally offered to nearby agencies as space permits. No self pay seats are offered.

After the Academy, Trainee Officers received four months of field training. During this time, trainees are paired with senior Field Training Officers who instruct and guide the trainees in police procedure, operations and safety. Trainings are released to full duty at the completion of this program.

Lateral applicants from Alaska can skip the APD Academy if they successfully completed the Alaska State Troopers ALET academy. These officers attend a two to four week long orientation before being hitting the street for field training. Depending on their experience, this field training time may be reduced. Academy credit for in-state lateral officers who attended the Tanana Valley Academy at the University Of Alaska Fairbanks are evaluated on a case-by-case basis.

== Equipment ==
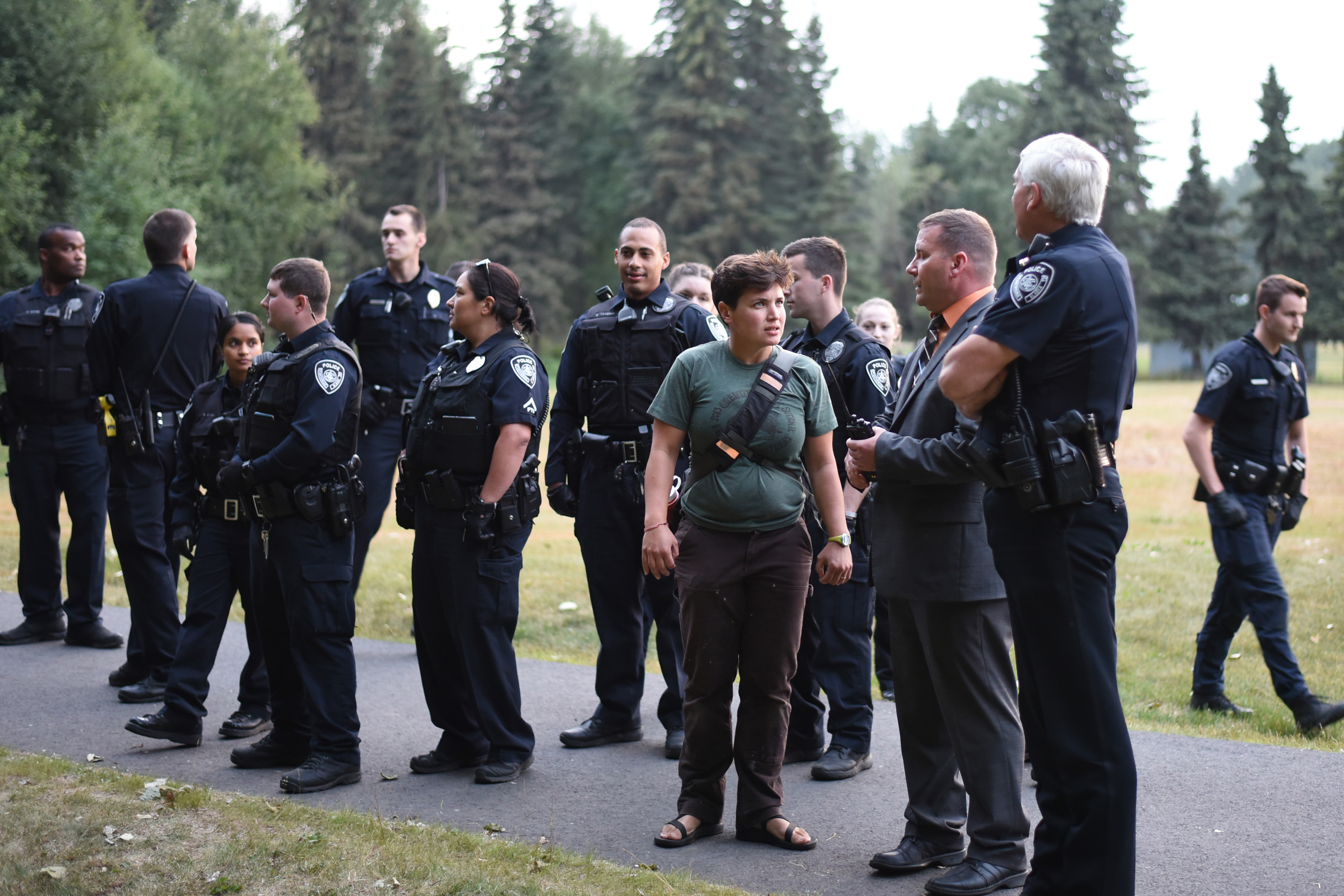
Lt. Jack Carson (dressed in plainclothes) speaks with organizers of a tent city set up in Valley of the Moon Park in July 2019. Numerous officers are standing by as they await further instructions.

New officers are issued Glock 17 Gen 4 handguns, though many older officers still carry their previously issued Glock 22 or Glock 21 handguns. APD officers are allowed to qualify with and carry personally purchased approved handguns to include; Many 1911s, Sig Sauer LEO Approved, Springfield XD-M Elite and the Smith & Wesson M&P. Officers are issued AR15 style patrol rifles chambered in 5.56mm. More senior officers may still carry and deploy with a Remington 870 shotgun, though these are being phased out.

Patrol officers are issued pepper spray, and straight stick baton and Axon Taser X2's. Other "Less lethal" tools are spread amongst the shifts to include 40mm foam batons, and pepper ball launchers.

Officers drive a mix of vehicles including Ford Police Interceptors (Ford Police Interceptor Utility and Ford Police Interceptor Sedan) Dodge Durango Pursuit, and Chevrolet Impalas, equipped for police duty. A few Ford Crown Victoria Police Interceptors are still used.

== See also ==
- List of law enforcement agencies in Alaska
