= Tougher In Alaska =

- Starring: Geo Beach
- Country of origin: United States
- No. of seasons: 1
- No. of episodes: 13

Production
- Running time: 60 Minutes (with commercials)
- Production company: Moore Huntley Productions

Original release
- Network: History Channel
- Release: May 8 – August 3, 2008

Tougher In Alaska is a program on the History Channel that was a part of the network's "American Original Series" lineup. Starring long-time Alaska resident Geo Beach, the program explored the dangerous and extraordinary efforts put forth by Alaskans to perform jobs and provide services in such a remote, large, rugged, and hostile place. The program premiered on May 8, 2008 and aired one 13-episode season. The series was produced by Moore Huntley Productions, whose previous programs include several other programs about Alaska. The Principal Cinematographer was Daniel J. Lyons of Vermont Films.

== Format ==
Each episode featured several related occupations in which Geo Beach joins the workers for a hands-on approach to the unique dangers of performing their job in Alaska, in a manner somewhat similar to the Discovery Channel program Dirty Jobs. The program switched back and forth between these jobs throughout each episode. Beach frequently commented on just how difficult or different life in Alaska can be, not only in the jobs themselves but also in the effort it takes just to get to where he or the fruits of his labor need to go.

== DVD releases ==
The one season of the program, featuring all 13 episodes, became available on DVD on September 30, 2008.

== Broadcast Airings ==
Repeats of the series are currently airing on the digital broadcast network Quest.
