= Seldovia Village, Alaska =

- Census-designated place
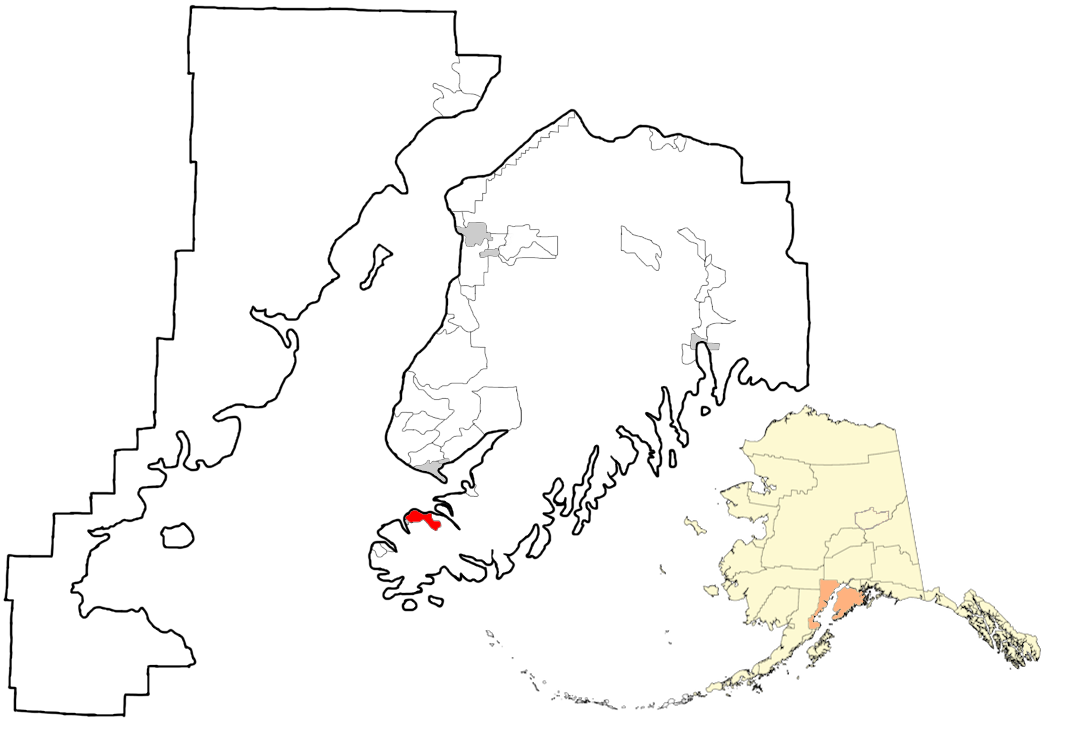
- Location in Kenai Peninsula Borough, Alaska
- Coordinates: 59°28′43″N 151°37′53″W
- Country: United States
- State: Alaska
- Borough: Kenai Peninsula

Government
  - Borough mayor: Peter Micciche
  - State senator: Gary Stevens (R)
  - State rep.: Sarah Vance (R)

Area
  - Total: 19.25 sq mi (49.86 km^{2})
  - Land: 18.14 sq mi (46.99 km^{2})
  - Water: 1.11 sq mi (2.87 km^{2})
- Elevation: 92 ft (28 m)

Population (2020)
  - Total: 199
  - Density: 11.0/sq mi (4.23/km^{2})
- Time zone: UTC-9 (Alaska (AKST))
  - Summer (DST): UTC-8 (AKDT)
- Area code: 907
- FIPS code: 02-68370
- GNIS feature ID: 1865565

Seldovia Village is a census-designated place (CDP) in Kenai Peninsula Borough, Alaska, United States. As of the 2020 census, Seldovia Village had a population of 199. Seldovia Village is not to be confused with the adjacent city of Seldovia.

== Geography ==
Seldovia Village is located on the southern arm of the Kenai Peninsula at 59°28′43″N 151°37′53″W (59.478498, -151.631299), on the south side of Kachemak Bay. It is 10 miles (16 km) southwest of the city of Homer, across Kachemak Bay. The CDP extends from Seldovia Bay on the west, where it borders the city of Seldovia, to Jakolof Bay on the east. While there are roads in the community, the only access to outside areas is via Seldovia, where there is a harbor and an airport.

According to the United States Census Bureau, the CDP has a total area of 19.2 square miles (49.8 km^{2}), of which 18.1 square miles (47.0 km^{2}) are land and 1.1 square miles (2.9 km^{2}), or 5.76%, are water.

== Demographics ==
Historical population
Census	Pop.	Note	%±
2000	144		—
2010	165		14.6%
2020	199		20.6%
U.S. Decennial Census

Seldovia Village first appeared on the 2000 U.S. Census as a census-designated place (CDP). It partially superseded the former CDP of Jakolof Bay, which existed from 1980-90 (population 36, 1980; 28, 1990), and was dissolved in 2000.

As of the census of 2000, there were 144 people, 62 households, and 40 families residing in the CDP. The population density was 7.3 inhabitants per square mile (2.8/km^{2}). There were 159 housing units at an average density of 8.0 per square mile (3.1/km^{2}). The racial makeup of the CDP was 56.25% White, 36.81% Native American, 0.69% Asian, 2.08% from other races, and 4.17% from two or more races. 0.69% of the population were Hispanic or Latino of any race.

There were 62 households, out of which 27.4% had children under the age of 18 living with them, 53.2% were married couples living together, 9.7% had a female householder with no husband present, and 33.9% were non-families. 22.6% of all households were made up of individuals, and 3.2% had someone living alone who was 65 years of age or older. The average household size was 2.32 and the average family size was 2.73.

In the CDP, the population was spread out, with 22.2% under the age of 18, 3.5% from 18 to 24, 18.8% from 25 to 44, 45.8% from 45 to 64, and 9.7% who were 65 years of age or older. The median age was 47 years. For every 100 females, there were 118.2 males. For every 100 females age 18 and over, there were 119.6 males.

The median income for a household in the CDP was $31,250, and the median income for a family was $40,500. Males had a median income of $40,625 versus $33,750 for females. The per capita income for the CDP was $21,396. There were 16.7% of families and 23.5% of the population living below the poverty line, including 11.1% of under eighteens and 100.0% of those over 64.
