= Alaska Department of Public Safety =

Government law enforcement agency in Alaska, United States

- Alaska Department of Public Safety patch
- Abbreviation: Alaska DPS
- Motto: Loyalty, Integrity, Courage

Agency overview
- Formed: January 3, 1959; 67 years ago
- Annual budget: $182,000,000

Jurisdictional structure
- Operations jurisdiction: Alaska, USA
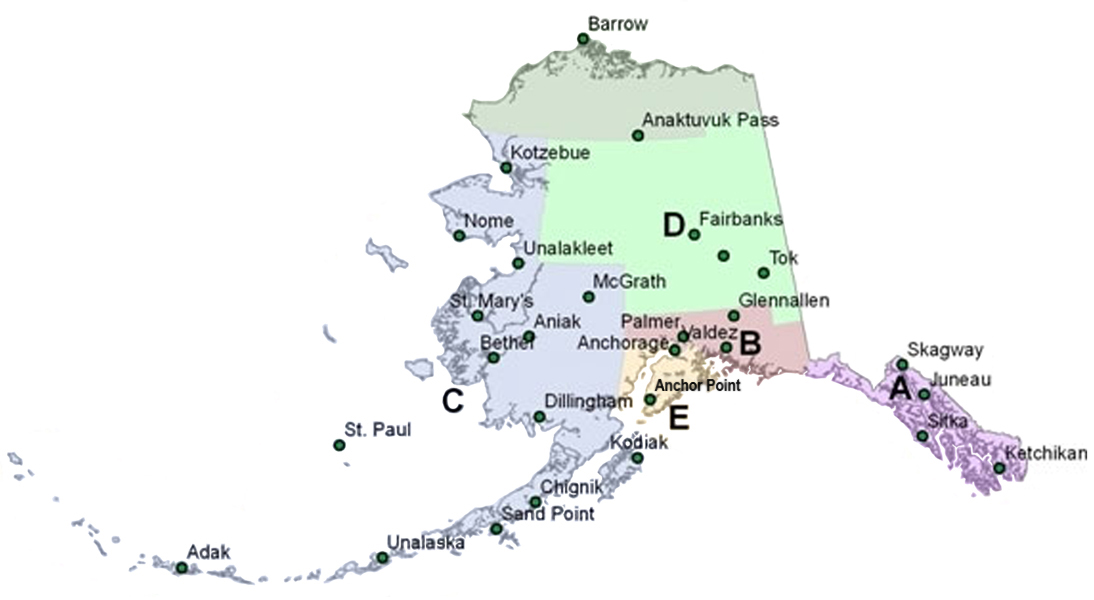
- Jurisdiction of the Alaska Department of Public Safety
- Area: 663,268 square miles (1,717,900 km^{2})
- Population: 683,879 (2020)
- Legal jurisdiction: (Alaska) Statewide
- Governing body: Government of Alaska
- General nature: Civilian police

Operational structure
- Headquarters: 5700 E. Tudor Rd. Anchorage, Alaska
- Governor of Alaska responsible: Mike Dunleavy
- Agency executives: James Cockrell, Commissioner; Leon Morgan, Deputy Commissioner

Website
- dps.alaska.gov

The Alaska Department of Public Safety is a law enforcement agency with its usual focus being the protection of life, property and wildlife resources in the state of Alaska in the United States.

The Alaska Department of Public Safety is under the direction of Commissioner James Cockrell.

Alaska DPS personnel enforce laws related to criminal statutes, traffic, wildlife, and fire. The Alaska DPS also performs search and rescue, court services and maintains criminal justice records.

== Divisions ==
DPS has five divisions:

- Division of Administrative Services
- Division of Alaska State Troopers
- Division of Fire and Life Safety
- Division of Statewide Services
- Division of Alaska Wildlife Troopers

DPS also administers:

- the Alaska Police Standards Council
- the Alaska Fire Standards Council
- the Council on Domestic Violence and Sexual Assault
- the Alaska Scientific Crime Detection Laboratory

== Unique feature ==
Unlike DPS agencies in many other states, due to the vast area of Alaska and limited local enforcement agencies, Alaska's DPS is the primary law enforcement and public safety organization for most of the state. The men and women of DPS provide service in conditions not usually found in many other parts of the country.

== Fallen officers ==
There have been 16 Alaska State Troopers, 1 Court Services Officer, and 2 K9s killed since its beginning in 1948.

Rank	Name	Date of death	Cause of death	Age	Location
Officer	Gary George Wohlfeil	03-05-1964	Killed along with Officer Leroy Garvin Bohuslov in an aircraft crash northwest of Fairwell, Alaska while conducting a low-level caribou survey	22	northwest of Fairwell, Alaska
Officer	Leroy Garvin Bohuslov	03-05-1964	Killed along with Officer Gary George Wohlfeil in an aircraft crash northwest of Fairwell, Alaska while conducting a low-level caribou survey	38	northwest of Fairwell, Alaska
Trooper	Dennis Finbar Cronin	02-18-1974	Shot and killed in his squad car while meeting with an informant; the shooter then committed suicide and his motives are unknown	31	Anchorage, Alaska
Trooper	Frank Stuart Rodman	12-11-1974	Killed along with Trooper Larry Robert Carr; they were transporting a drowning victim back in an airplane when the plane crashed in the ocean, 10 minutes away from landing, for unknown reasons; only 1 out of the 3 bodies were found	25	off the coast of Kodiak Island, Alaska
Trooper	Larry Robert Carr	12-11-1974	Killed along with Trooper Frank Stuart Rodman; they were transporting a drowning victim back in an airplane when the plane crashed in the ocean, 10 minutes away from landing, for unknown reasons; only 1 out of the 3 bodies were found	23	off the coast of Kodiak Island, Alaska
Trooper	Roland Edgar Chevalier Skip, Jr.	04-03-1982	Shot and killed after intervening in a domestic dispute between a drunk father and mentally-ill son at Cleary Summit Ski Area; shot with a .30-.06	33	Cleary Summit Ski Area in Fairbanks, Alaska
Sergeant	John David Stimson	01-14-1983	Killed overnight by hypothermia after a helicopter crash while searching for a missing pilot; the pilot broke his back and Stimson made him as comfortable as possible; the pilot survived	41	near Cordova, Alaska
Trooper	Troy Lynn Duncan	05-19-1984	Shot and killed while he and other SWAT members searched for a serial killer in the woods by helicopter; the shooter opened fire and hit Trooper Duncan, he was a U.S. Marine Corps veteran	34	near Manley Hot Springs, Alaska
Sergeant	Robert Lee Bittick	10-11-1994	Killed in an aircraft crash during bad weather	55	near Haines, Alaska
Trooper	Bruce Alan Heck	01-10-1997	Killed in a fight on a traffic stop on Glenn Highway	42	in between Mendeltna and Tolsona, Alaska
Sergeant	David C. Churchill	11-16-1998	Killed when he suffered a heart attack while hiking up a mountain searching for a hunting party	51	N/A
Trooper	James A. Moen	06-25-2001	Killed in an aircraft crash; causes of the crash are unknown	49	in Lake Iliamna, Alaska
Trooper	Hans-Peter Roelle	11-24-2001	Shot and killed after chasing a suspect to his home	40	Wasilla, Alaska
Trooper	Tage Brandel Toll	03-30-2013	Killed in a helicopter crash while on a search and rescue mission	40	Near Talkeetna, Alaska
Sergeant	Patrick Scott Johnson	05-01-2014	Shot and killed along with Trooper Gabriel Lenox Rich while responding to reports of a person with a firearm	45	Tanana, Alaska
Trooper	Gabriel Lenox Rich	05-01-2014	Shot and killed along with Sergeant Patrick Scott Johnson while responding to reports of a person with a firearm	26	Tanana, Alaska
K9	Helo	11-25-2016	Shot and killed while chasing a suspect through the woods after a vehicle chase	N/A	Palmer, Alaska
K9	Rico	03-26-2017	Shot and killed while chasing a suspect after a vehicle chase	3	Wasilla, Alaska
Court Services Officer	Curtis Worland	12-13-2022	Killed by a muskox while defending a dog kennel		Nome, Alaska

== See also ==
- Sex Offender/Child Kidnapper Registry
- List of law enforcement agencies in Alaska
