= Juneau Police Department =

Law enforcement agency in Juneau, Alaska, United States

Coordinates: 58°21′21″N 134°30′29″W

- Abbreviation: JPD

Jurisdictional structure
- Operations jurisdiction: Juneau, Alaska, USA
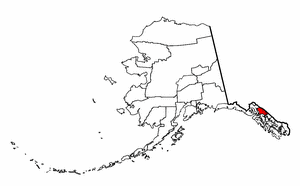
- Map of Juneau Police Department's jurisdiction
- Area: 3,255 square miles (8,430 km^{2})
- Population: 31,848 (2021)
- General nature: Local civilian police

Operational structure
- Headquarters: 6255 Alaway Avenue, Juneau, Alaska
- Police Officers: 57
- Civilians: 40
- Agency executive: Derek Bos, Chief of Police

Website
- Juneau Police

The Juneau Police Department (JPD) is a law enforcement agency which serves Juneau, Alaska.

The department consists of two divisions: Administrative Support Services and Operations. Within these divisions there are five units: Patrol, Investigations, Community Service, Records and Dispatch. The department includes specialists in SWAT, bomb disposal and hostage negotiation.

The Chief is Derek Bos.

In April 2008, the police reversed its previous policy of not reporting rapes as sex crimes in its daily briefing report.

In July 2008, the police department reported an increase in robberies.

Juneau Crime Line, a non-profit organization, offers rewards for anonymous crime tips in cooperation with the police department.

On December 1, 2009, Juneau PD became the first agency accredited by Alaska Law Enforcement Agency Accreditation Commission (ALEAAC).

== Rank structure ==
Title	Insignia
Chief	
Deputy Chief	
Commander	
Sergeant	
Detective	
Police Officer	

== Fallen officers ==
Since the establishment of the Juneau Police Department, four officers have died while on duty.

== See also ==
- List of law enforcement agencies in Alaska
- Capital City Fire and Rescue

== Bibliography ==
- Greg Browning (January 2008). "Copyright: Juneau Police Department". Journal of the Alaska Peace Officers and Associates. 2008: 149–150.
