= Crittenden (surname) =

Crittenden is an English surname. Notable people with the surname include:

Military, law, and public service
- Alexander P. Crittenden (1816–1870), 19th-century attorney and politician in California; nephew of John J. Crittenden; grandson of John Crittenden Sr.
- Dorothea Crittenden (1915–2008), Canadian deputy minister for the Ministry of Community and Social Services
- Eugenia Crittenden Luallen (née Blackburn; born 1952), former Lieutenant Governor of Kentucky
- Flora D. Crittenden (1924–2021), American educator and civil rights activist in Virginia turned politician
- George B. Crittenden (1812–1880), U.S. Army officer
- Joe Crittenden (born 1944), Cherokee Nation politician
- John Crittenden Sr. (1754–1809), U.S. Army officer and politician
- John J. Crittenden (1787–1863), American politician
- John Crittenden Watson (1842–1923), admiral of the U.S. Navy; grandson of John J. Crittenden
- Paul Crittenden (born 1958), former Australian Labor Party (New South Wales Branch) politician
- Robert Crittenden (1797–1834), American lawyer and Arkansas politician
- Robert Crittenden Newton (1840–1877), American lawyer, politician, and Confederate Colonel from Arkansas
- Shawn Crittenden, Cherokee Nation politician
- Thomas Leonidas Crittenden (1819–1893), American lawyer, politician and U.S. Army general
- Thomas Theodore Crittenden (1832–1909), U.S. Army officer and politician
- Thomas T. Crittenden Jr. (1863–1938), Mayor of Kansas City, Missouri, from 1907 to 1910
- Thomas Turpin Crittenden (1825–1905), U.S. Army officer
- William Logan Crittenden (1823–1851), U.S. Army officer who fought in the Mexican–American War
Sports
- Freddie Crittenden (born 1994), American track hurdler
- Howie Crittenden (1933–2013), American basketball player
- Monreko Crittenden (1980–2015), American football offensive lineman
- Nick Crittenden (born 1978), English footballer
- Ray Crittenden (born 1970), American football wide receiver
Performing arts
- Billy Crittenden, vocalist with the Nashville vocal quartet, 4 Runner
- Dianne Crittenden (1941–2024), American casting director
- Jennifer Crittenden (born 1969), American screenwriter and producer
- Kate Sara Chittenden (1856–1949), Canadian and U.S. professor of music, music school founder, and piano teacher
- Lisa Crittenden (born 1962), Australian actress
- Melodie Crittenden (born 1968), American country and Christian music artist
- Spencer Crittenden, American assistant writer for the TV series, Great Minds with Dan Harmon
- T. D. Crittenden (1878–1938), American silent film actor
Commerce
- Oscar Crittenden (1887–1954), Australian retailer
- Gary Crittenden (born 1953), American financial manager, former private equity executive, and retail bank executive
Religion
- Stephen Crittenden (born 1963), leading religion journalists and broadcaster from Australia
- William Crittenden (1908–2003), fifth Bishop of Erie in The Episcopal Church, between 1952 and 1973
Other
- Ann Crittenden Coleman (née, Crittenden; pen name, Mrs. Chapman Coleman; 1813–1891), American 19th-century author
- Christopher Crittenden (1902–1969), American historian
- Danielle Crittenden (born 1963), Canadian-American author and journalist
- Edwin Butler Crittenden, (1915–2015), American architect, late of Anchorage, Alaska
- Eugene C. Crittenden (1880–1956), president of (i) the Philosophical Society of Washington (1922) and (ii) Optical Society of America (1932)
- Inez Crittenden (1887–1918), leader of the "Hello Girls", the U.S. Telephone Corps in France during World War I
- Katharine Crittenden (1921–2010), American historic preservationist from Alaska
- Lee Crittenden, Lena Crittenden, pennames of Lela E. Buis, American fiction writer, playwright, poet, and artist
- Nick Crittenden (writer), British writer
- Patricia McKinsey Crittenden (born 1945), American psychologist
- Peter Crittenden, British lichenologist
- Robyn Crittenden, American attorney from the state of Georgia
- Victoria Crittenden, (born 1956) is an American academic and management consultant
Infamous
- Javaris Crittenton (born 1987), American, former NBA player who served a prison sentence for a conviction of involuntary manslaughter

== See also ==
- Javaris Crittenton, basketball player
