= Matanuska–Susitna College =

Two-year college in Palmer, Alaska, U.S.

- Other name: Mat-Su College
- Former name: Palmer Community College
- Type: Public community and technical college
- Established: 1958; 68 years ago
- Parent institution: University of Alaska Anchorage
- Director: Marie Gardner
- Location: 8295 E College Dr, Palmer, Alaska, United States; 61°34′46″N 149°14′26″W
- Website: matsu.alaska.edu

Matanuska–Susitna College, commonly known as Mat-Su College, is a community college in Palmer, Alaska serving the Matanuska-Susitna Valley that is part of the University of Alaska Anchorage system.. The college began in 1958 as Palmer Community College, changing its name in 1963 to correspond to the Matanuska-Susitna Borough where it is located. Total enrollment is about 1,100 students per semester. Dr. Marie Gardner is the college director.
