= Daphne Brown =

American architect (1948–2011)

- Born: Daphne Elizabeth Brown; April 28, 1948; Manchester, New Hampshire, U.S.
- Died: December 10, 2011 (aged 63); Anchorage, Alaska, U.S.
- Occupation: architect
- Years active: 1975–2010
- Known for: Project manager of the Anchorage Museum expansion
- Spouse: Jonathan Curry Steele

Daphne Elizabeth Brown (1948–2011) was an American architect who was posthumously inducted into the Alaska Women's Hall of Fame and awarded the Kumin Award from the American Institute of Architects, the highest recognition for architectural achievement in Alaska.

== Biography ==
Daphne Elizabeth Brown was born April 28, 1948, in Manchester, New Hampshire, United States, to Sophie Mary (née Rowbotham) and Ridgley Staniford Brown. In her childhood, her family relocated to Gardner, Massachusetts, and she attended school at Walnut Hill School in Natick, Massachusetts. She continued her education at the University of Pennsylvania, graduating with a bachelor's degree in 1970 and in 1973, earned her master's degree in architecture from the University of Washington.

In 1975, Brown moved to Alaska and began her career working for Edwin Butler Crittenden at CCC Architects in Anchorage. She began working with Kumin Associates in 1987 and in 1988, her work was recognized in the American Institute of Architects (AIA) traveling exhibition to acknowledge the contributions of women architects. The exhibition, entitled Many More: Women in Architecture, 1978-1988, featured 77 projects accepted from women architects by the committee. She was honored with a Loeb fellowship from the Harvard Graduate School of Design in 1989.

Brown was involved in many corollary support organizations, serving as the chair of the state licensing board for architecture, engineering and land surveying; the chair of the board for subdivisions and boundaries; and the chair of the planning and zoning commission. In 2002, she began work on a project to expand and renovate the Anchorage Museum at Rasmuson Center. Brown's role in the project was to ensure that the design met with the "technical, climatic, structural, and seismic" requirements of Anchorage codes and conditions, She served as the overall project manager of the 90,000 sq ft addition and remodeling of the existing space. In 2007, she became a partner in Kumin Associates.

Brown died of uterine cancer on December 10, 2011, in Anchorage, Alaska. In 2013, she was posthumously honored as an inductee into the Alaska Women's Hall of Fame and was awarded the Kumin Award from the AIA, the highest recognition for architectural achievement in Alaska.
