= Edwin Butler Crittenden =

American architect

- Born: November 26, 1915; New Haven, Connecticut
- Died: January 10, 2015 (aged 99); Anchorage, Alaska
- Occupation: Architect

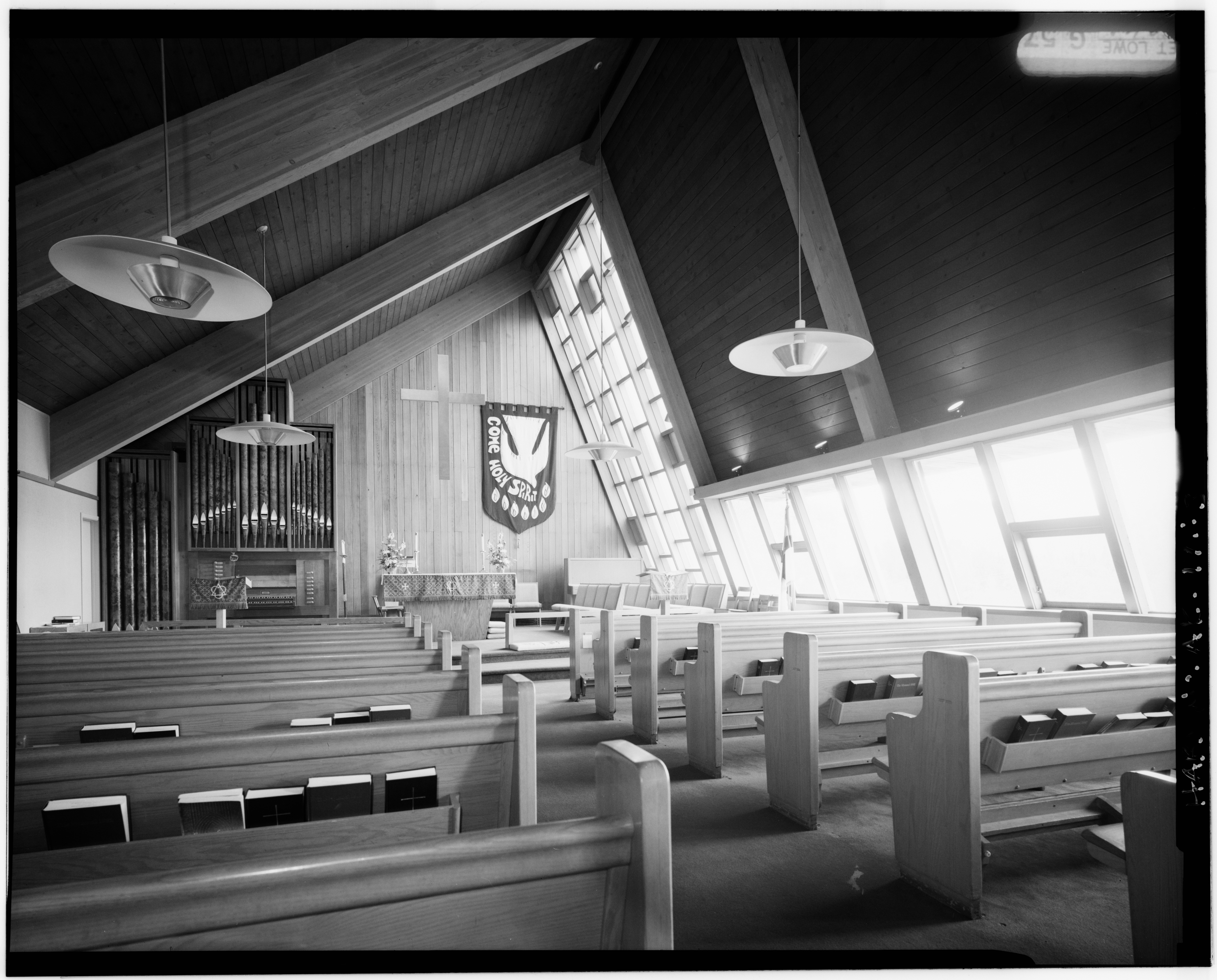
Interior of St. Mary Episcopal Church, Anchorage, Alaska, 1955.

Edwin Butler Crittenden FAIA (1915-2015) was an American architect practicing in Anchorage, Alaska. Referred to later in life as the "dean of Alaska architecture", he was the most notable Alaskan architect of the 20th century.

== Life and career ==
Edwin Butler Crittenden was born November 26, 1915, in New Haven, Connecticut, to Walter Eaton Crittenden and Harriet (Butler) Crittenden. He attended Pomona College ('38), Yale University ('42) and the Massachusetts Institute of Technology ('47). He served in the United States Coast Guard from 1942 to 1946, and worked for Santa Paula, California, architect Roy C. Wilson between 1946 and 1948. He then relocated to Alaska, where he worked for the Alaska Housing Authority until 1951. That year, Crittenden established his own architecture practice in Anchorage. Originally practicing as Edwin B. Crittenden, when engineer Arthur R. Jacobs joined the firm in 1954 it became Edwin Crittenden, Architects & Associates. Additional associates included Lucian A. Cassetta, who joined the firm in 1957, and Wallace J. Wellenstein, who joined in 1960. In 1962 Wellenstein left to establish his own firm, and with the promotion of C. Harold Wirum, an employee since 1954, the firm became Crittenden, Cassetta, Wirum & Jacobs. In 1968 Jacobs left to form his own engineering practice, and Kenneth D. Cannon was made partner in the new firm of Crittenden, Cassetta, Wirum & Cannon.

In 1971 the firm agreed with Hellmuth, Obata & Kassabaum of St. Louis and San Francisco. They formed the jointly operated firm of CCWC/HOK Architects and Planners for work in Alaska. A month later Wirum left the partnership, forming Maynard & Wirum with Kenneth Maynard. Maynard had worked for the Crittenden firm from 1962 to 1965. CCC/HOK Architects and Planners operated until the agreement ended in 1980, though HOK continued to pursue Alaskan projects. (Note: The San Francisco office of HOK designed the BP Exploration Alaska Building in Anchorage, built from 1982 to 1985.) During the early 1980s, CCC Architects and Planners was the largest architectural firm in Alaska.

In addition to extensive building projects, CCC/HOK was also involved in the 1976 selection by voters of Willow, Alaska, as the site of a new state capital to replace Juneau. The firm was selected as prime consultant to the Capital Site Selection Committee, empowered by a 1974 ballot initiative. Voters selected Willow from three proposed sites, though construction never began at Willow and the project was cancelled in 1982.

As a consequence of the drop in oil prices and the recession that followed, the firm went bankrupt in 1986. It was reorganized as Architects Alaska, which it remains, though Crittenden was not a member of the new firm. After leaving practice, Crittenden spent four years as a campus architect for Sheldon Jackson College in Sitka. He finally retired from architecture in 1990.

== Personal life ==
Crittenden was married in 1944 to Katharine Carson, who would become known as a preservationist throughout Alaska. They had six children, and their eldest son, John Crittenden, would also become an architect.

In 1963 Crittenden took a sabbatical from his practice. He and his family lived for a year in Helsinki, where he studied northern design strategies and the work of Alvar Aalto and Ralph Erskine.

Katharine died in Anchorage in 2010, as did Edwin on January 10, 2015, at the age of 99.

== Legacy ==
Through his practice, Crittenden was a mentor to many architects who established their own Alaska practices, and was significant to the development of a theory and practice of northern and arctic architecture. In addition to those mentioned above, another notable architect who worked for Crittenden was Daphne Brown, who began working at CCC/HOK in 1975. In later life Crittenden was referred to as the "Dean" of Alaska architecture.

Crittenden was active in the American Institute of Architects, joining in 1957. In 1961 he cofounded the Alaska chapter, and served as its first president. In 1979 Crittenden was elected to the College of Fellows of the AIA, the first Alaska architect to receive the honor. In 1981, he was elected director of the AIA Northwest and Pacific Region. Further honors included the Medal of Honor of the AIA Northwest and Pacific Region in 2010, an honorary Doctor of Humanities degree from the University of Alaska Anchorage in 2010 and the Kumin Award of AIA Alaska in 2012.

After his death the Edwin B. Crittenden Award for Excellence in Northern Design was established in his honor by AIA Alaska, and was first awarded in 2019.

== Architectural works ==
- Anchorage Municipal Auditorium, Anchorage, Alaska (1954, demolished)
- Visitor Information Center, Anchorage, Alaska (1954)
- St. Mary Episcopal Church, Anchorage, Alaska (1955)
- Stuart Hall, University of Alaska Fairbanks, Fairbanks, Alaska (1955)
- Austin House and Condit House, Sheldon Jackson College, Sitka, Alaska (1957–58)
- Chancellor's House, (Note: Used as the President's Residence before 1993.) University of Alaska Fairbanks, Fairbanks, Alaska (1958)
- Walsh Hall, University of Alaska Fairbanks, Fairbanks, Alaska (1958)
- Clark Middle School, Anchorage, Alaska (1958, demolished)
- Addition to the United States Federal Building (former), Anchorage, Alaska (1958, NRHP 1978)
- Public Safety Building, Anchorage, Alaska (1961, demolished)
- Wendler Middle School, Anchorage, Alaska (1961)
- National Bank of Alaska Building, Anchorage, Alaska (1963, altered)
- Hotel Captain Cook, (Note: Crittenden designed Tower I, Tower II was added in 1972 by Maynard & Wirum and Tower III in 1978.) Anchorage, Alaska (1964–65)
- Moore Hall, University of Alaska Fairbanks, Fairbanks, Alaska (1966)
- McLaughlin Youth Center, Anchorage, Alaska (1967)
- Pratt Museum, Homer, Alaska (1967–68)
- Valdez City Hall, Valdez, Alaska (1967)
- 4th Avenue Marketplace, Anchorage, Alaska (1969)
- Anchorage Air Route Traffic Control Center, Anchorage, Alaska (1969)
- Bristol Bay Borough School, Naknek, Alaska (1969)
- ENSTAR Natural Gas Company Building, Anchorage, Alaska (1969)
- Unocal Building, Anchorage, Alaska (1969)
- Bartlett Hall, University of Alaska Fairbanks, Fairbanks, Alaska (1970)
- Bartlett High School, (Note: Designed in association with Manley & Mayer, also of Anchorage.) Anchorage, Alaska (1971–73)
- Dimond Courthouse, Juneau, Alaska (1973–75)
- UAA/APU Consortium Library, Anchorage, Alaska (1973, altered 2002-04)
- Hiland Mountain Correctional Center, Eagle River, Alaska (1974)
- ARCO Prudhoe Bay Operations Center, Prudhoe Bay, Alaska (1975)
- West Valley High School, Fairbanks, Alaska (1975–76)
- James M. Fitzgerald United States Courthouse and Federal Building, (Note: Designed in association with John Graham & Company and Kirk Wallace McKinley AIA & Associates, both of Seattle.) Anchorage, Alaska (1976–79 and 1979–80)
- Seawolf Sports Complex, University of Alaska Anchorage, Anchorage, Alaska (1977)
- Sheraton Anchorage Hotel, Anchorage, Alaska (1977–79)
- Noel Wien Public Library, Fairbanks, Alaska (1977)
- University of Alaska Museum of the North, University of Alaska Fairbanks, Fairbanks, Alaska (1981, altered 2002-06)
- William A. Egan Civic and Convention Center, Anchorage, Alaska (1983)
- Grace Hall, Alaska Pacific University, Anchorage, Alaska (1984)
- Fine Arts Building, University of Alaska Anchorage, Anchorage, Alaska (1986)

=== Gallery ===
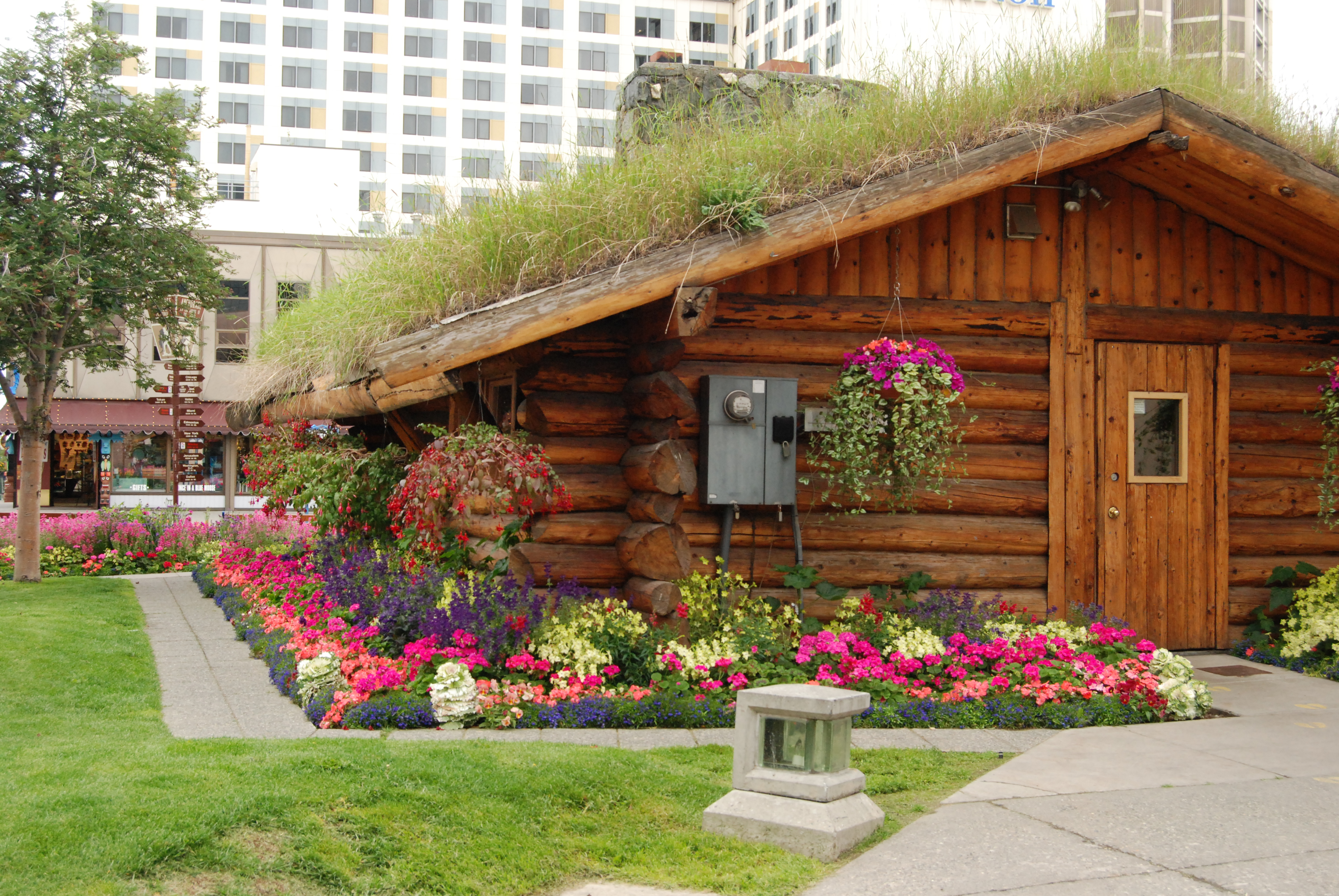
Visitor Information Center, Anchorage, Alaska, 1954.

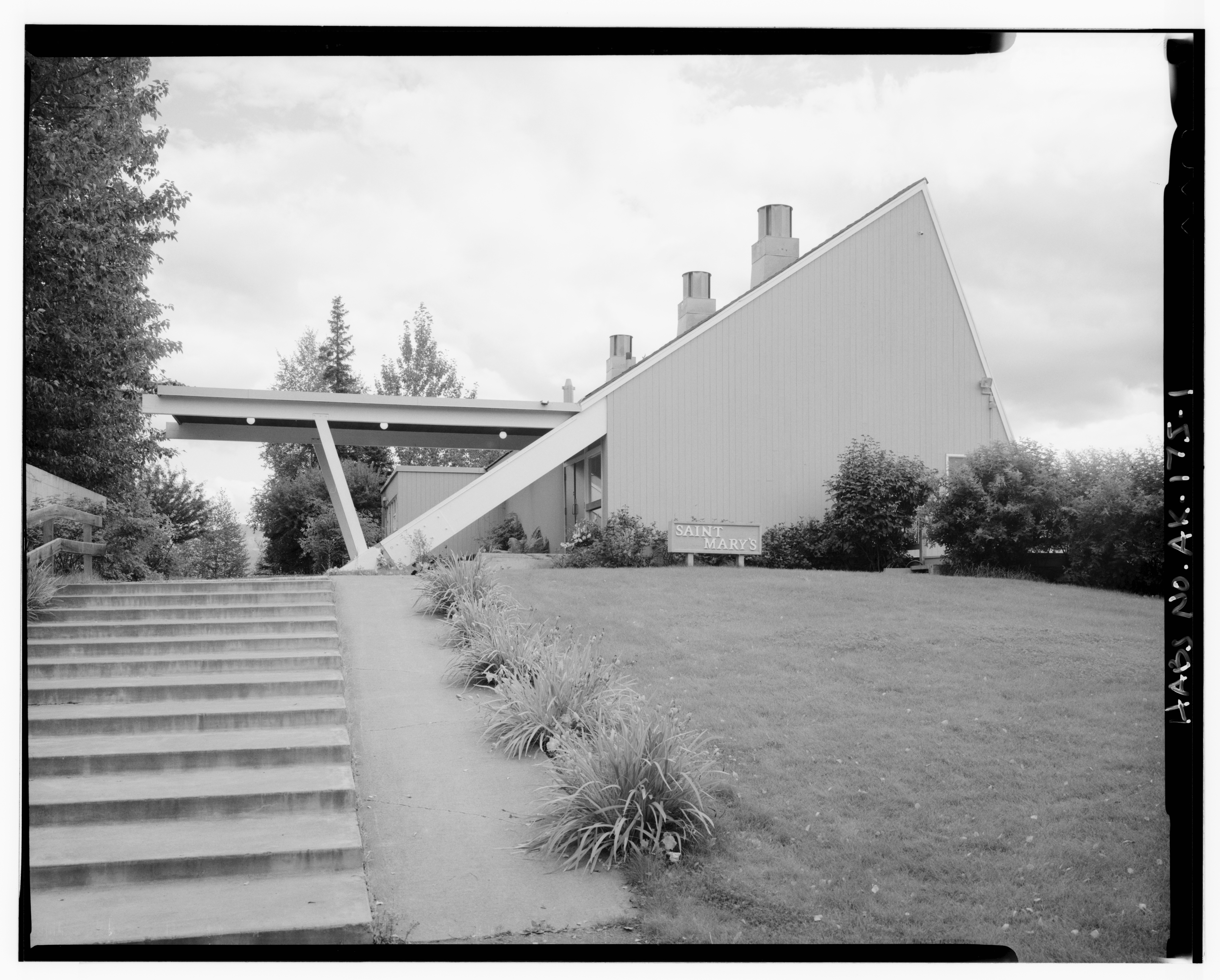
St. Mary Episcopal Church, Anchorage, Alaska, 1955.

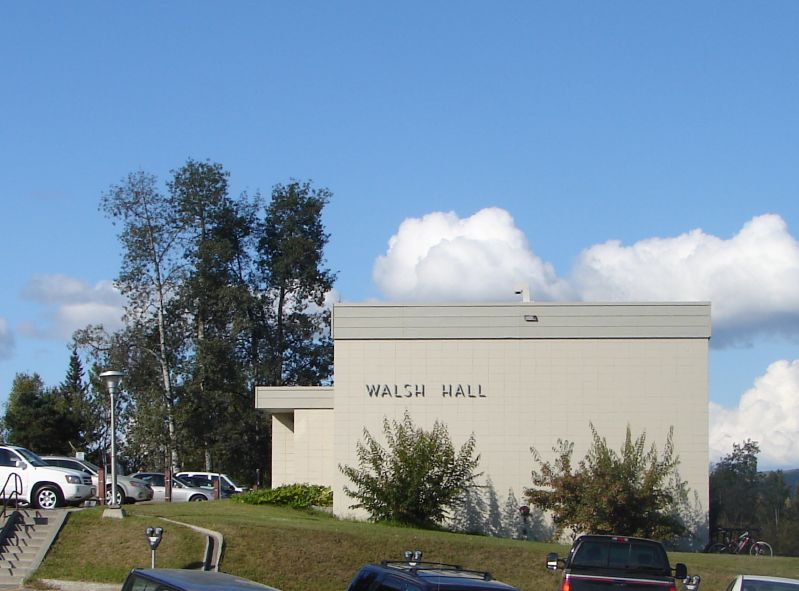
Walsh Hall, University of Alaska Fairbanks, Fairbanks, Alaska, 1958.

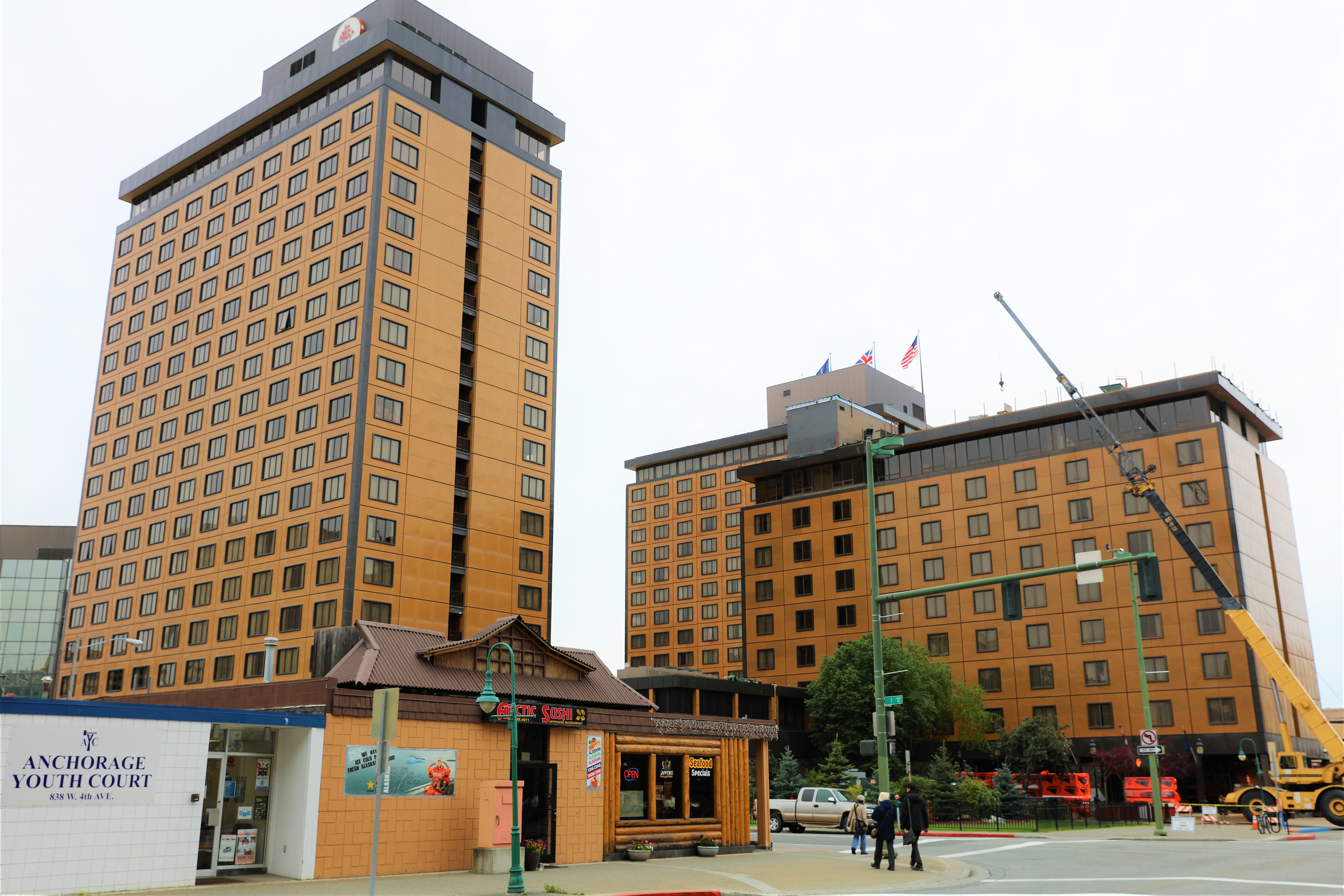
Hotel Captain Cook, Anchorage, Alaska, 1964-65.

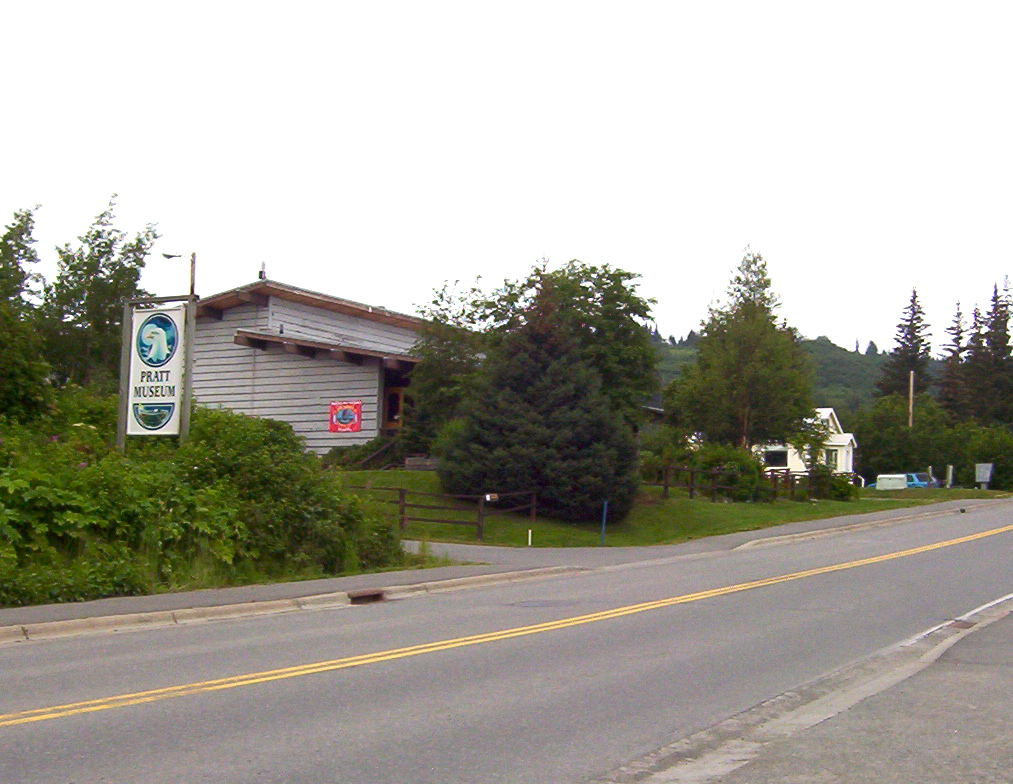
Pratt Museum, Homer, Alaska, 1967-68.

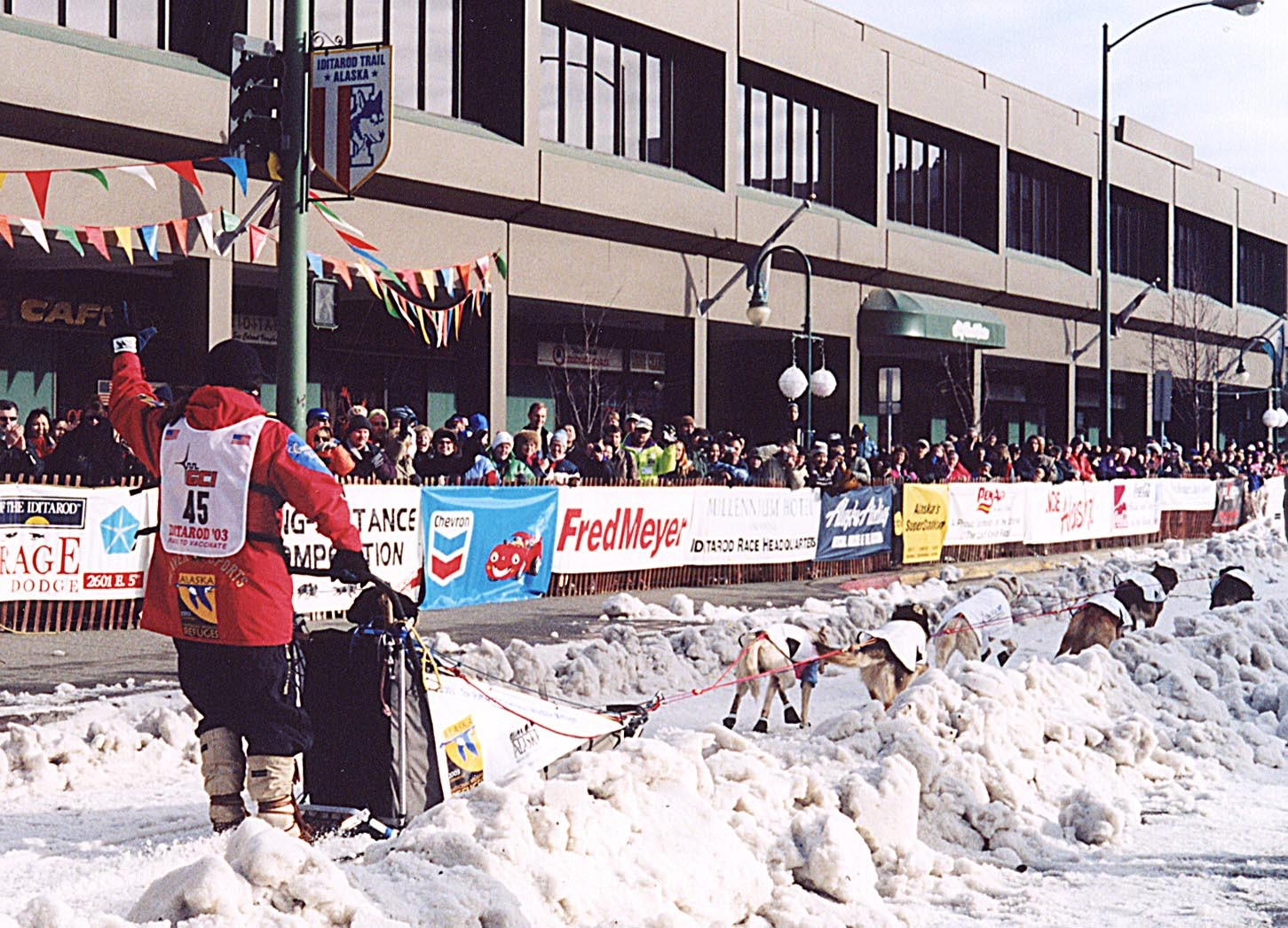
4th Avenue Marketplace (background), Anchorage, Alaska, 1969.

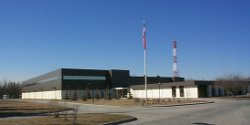
Anchorage Air Route Traffic Control Center, Anchorage, Alaska, 1969.

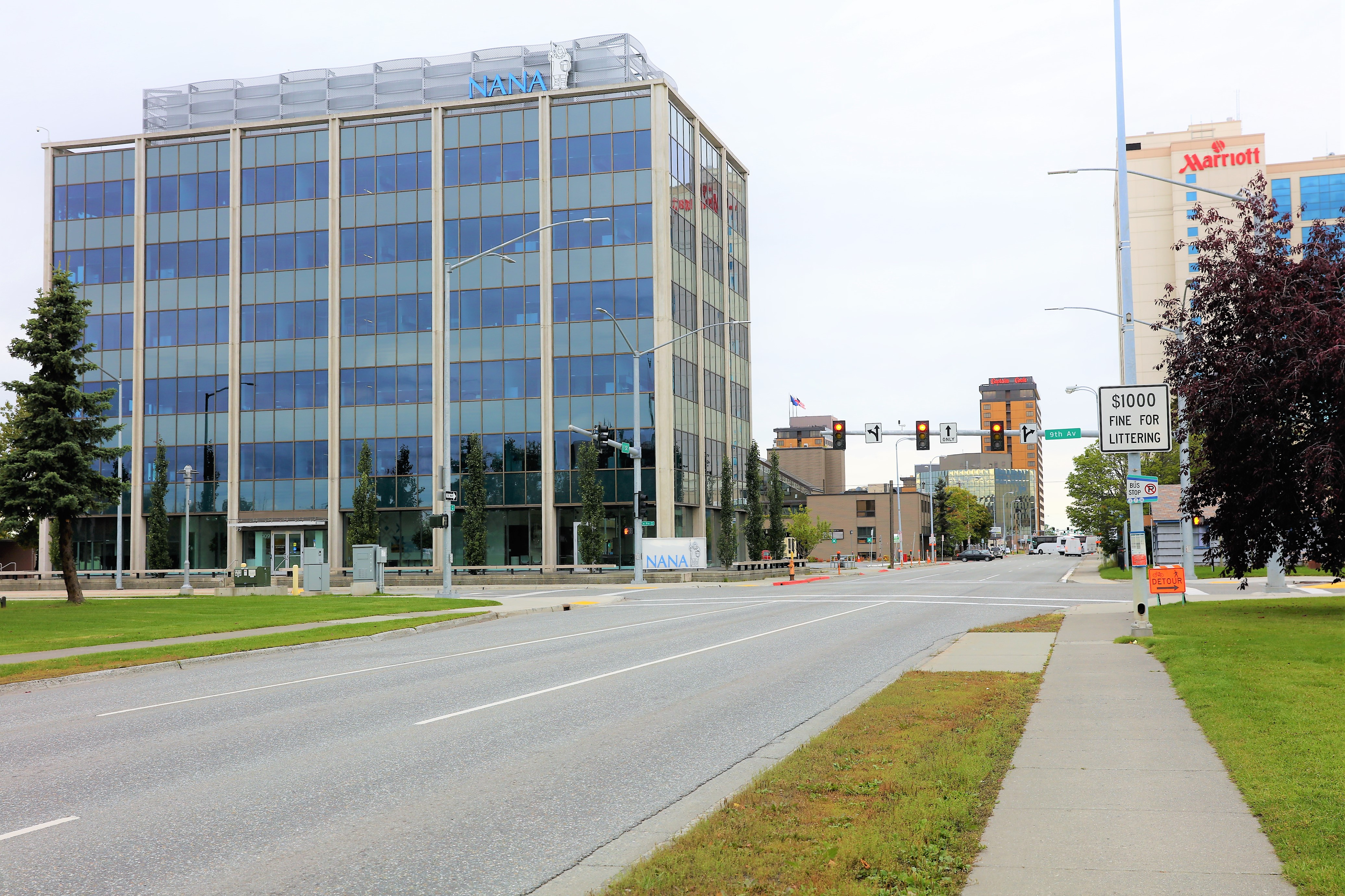
Unocal Building, Anchorage, Alaska, 1969.

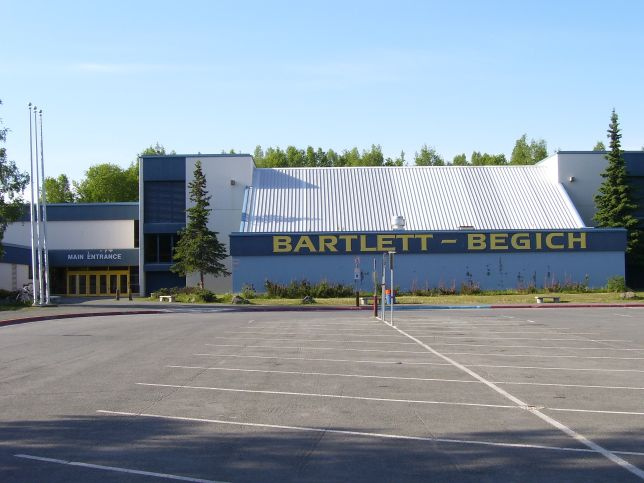
Bartlett High School, Anchorage, Alaska, 1971-73.

Interior of the James M. Fitzgerald United States Courthouse and Federal Building, Anchorage, Alaska, 1976-79 and 1979-80.

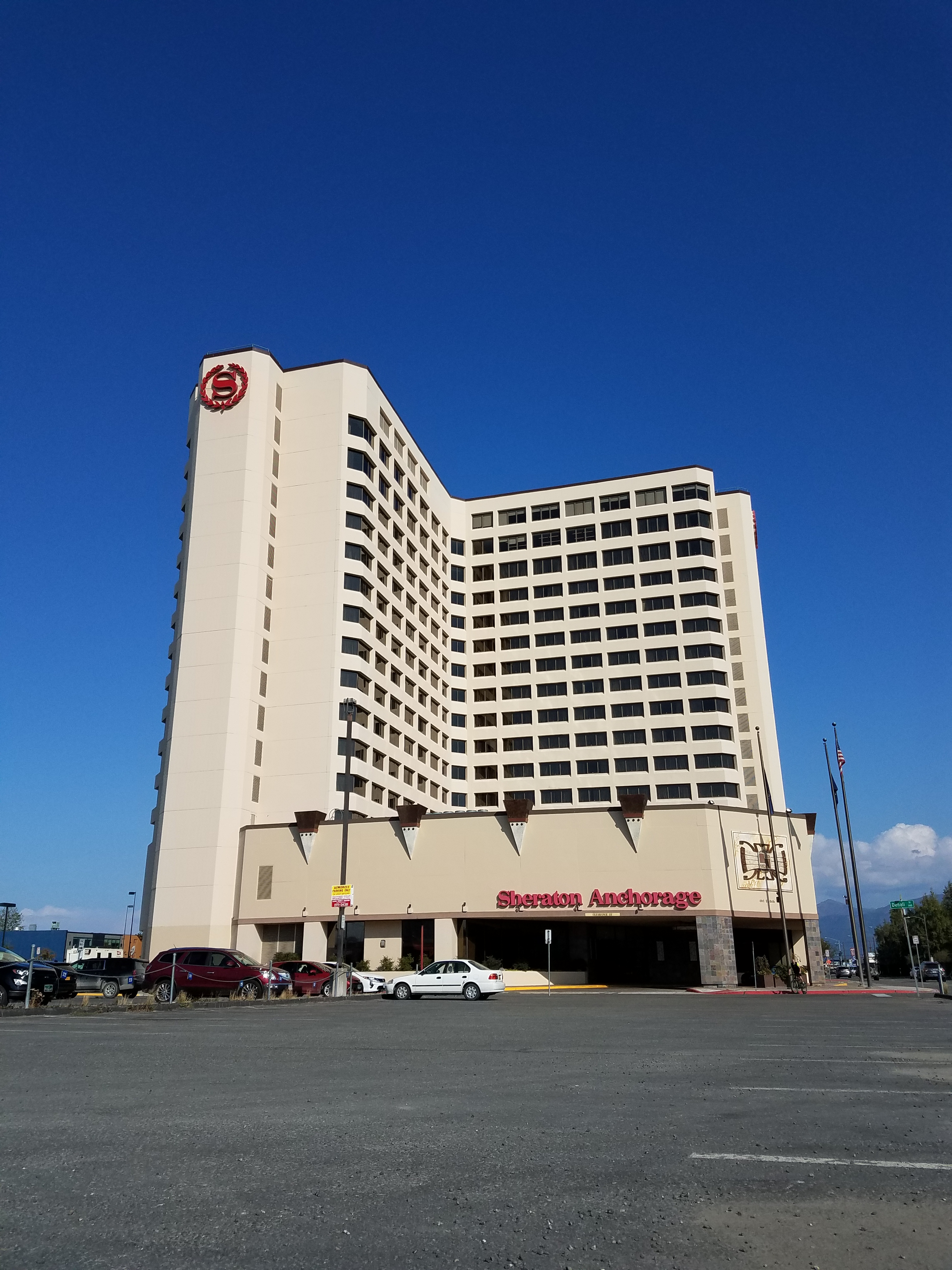
Sheraton Anchorage Hotel, Anchorage, Alaska, 1977-79.

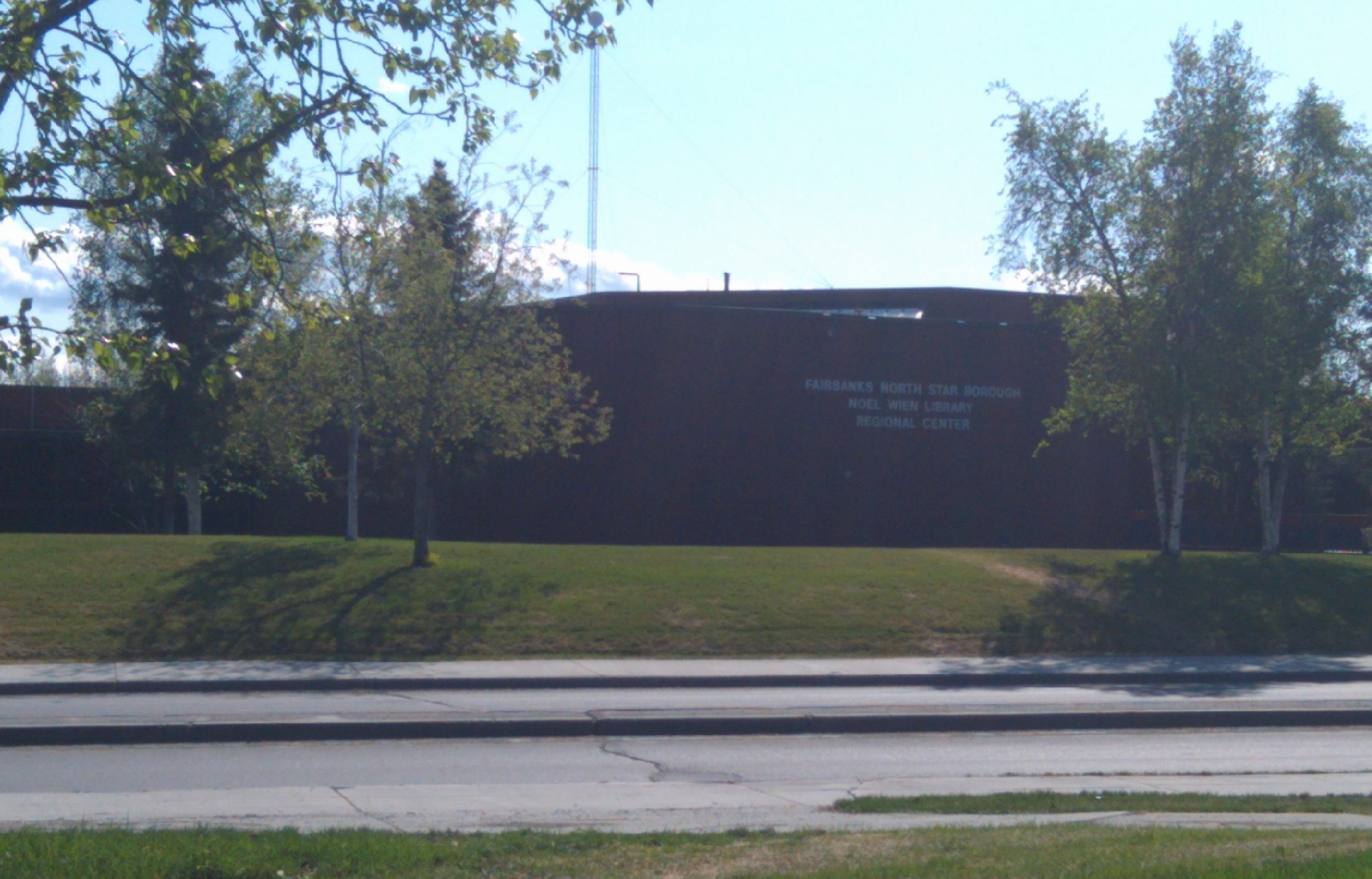
Noel Wien Public Library, Fairbanks, Alaska, 1977.

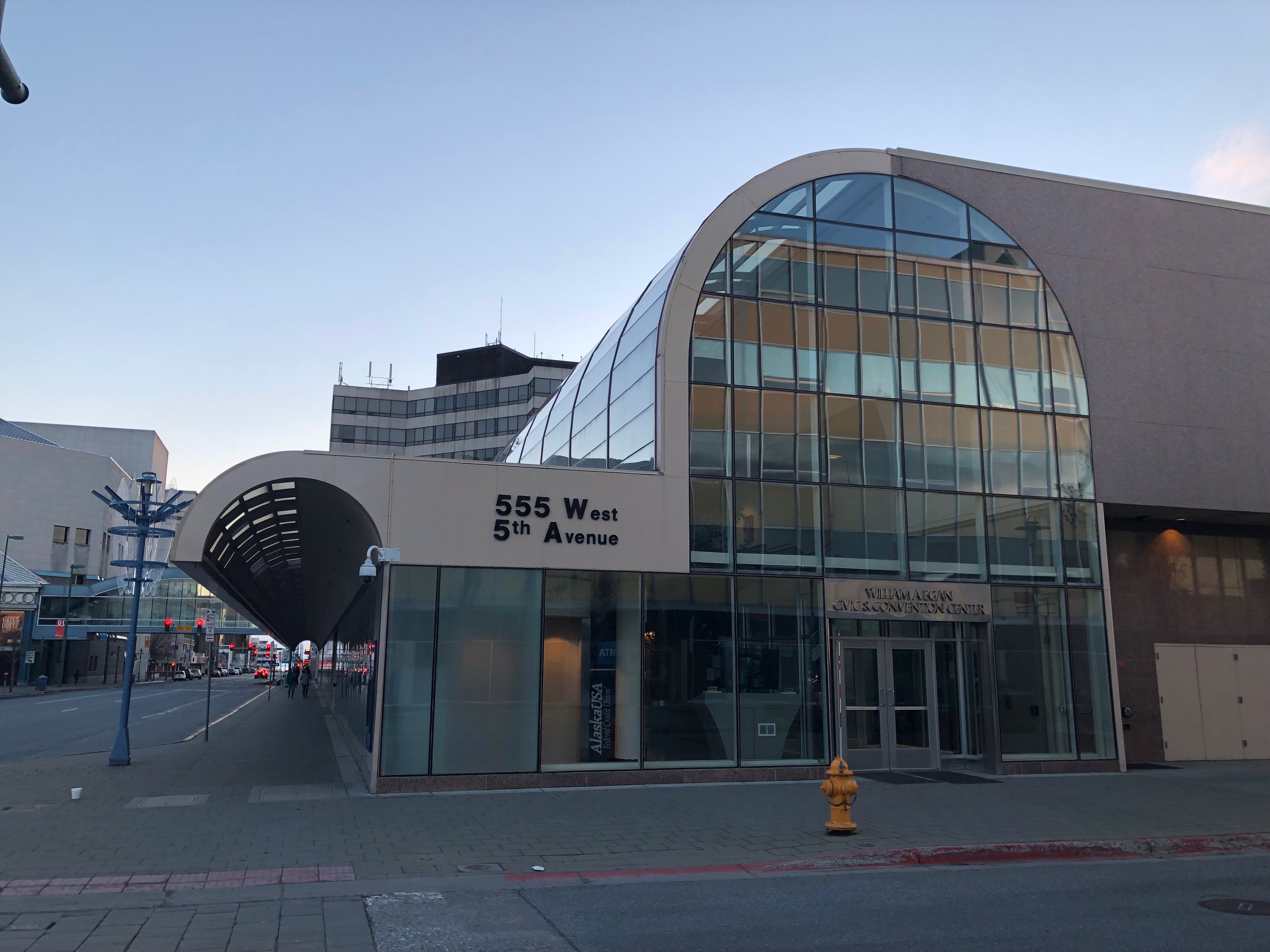
William A. Egan Civic and Convention Center, Anchorage, Alaska, 1983.

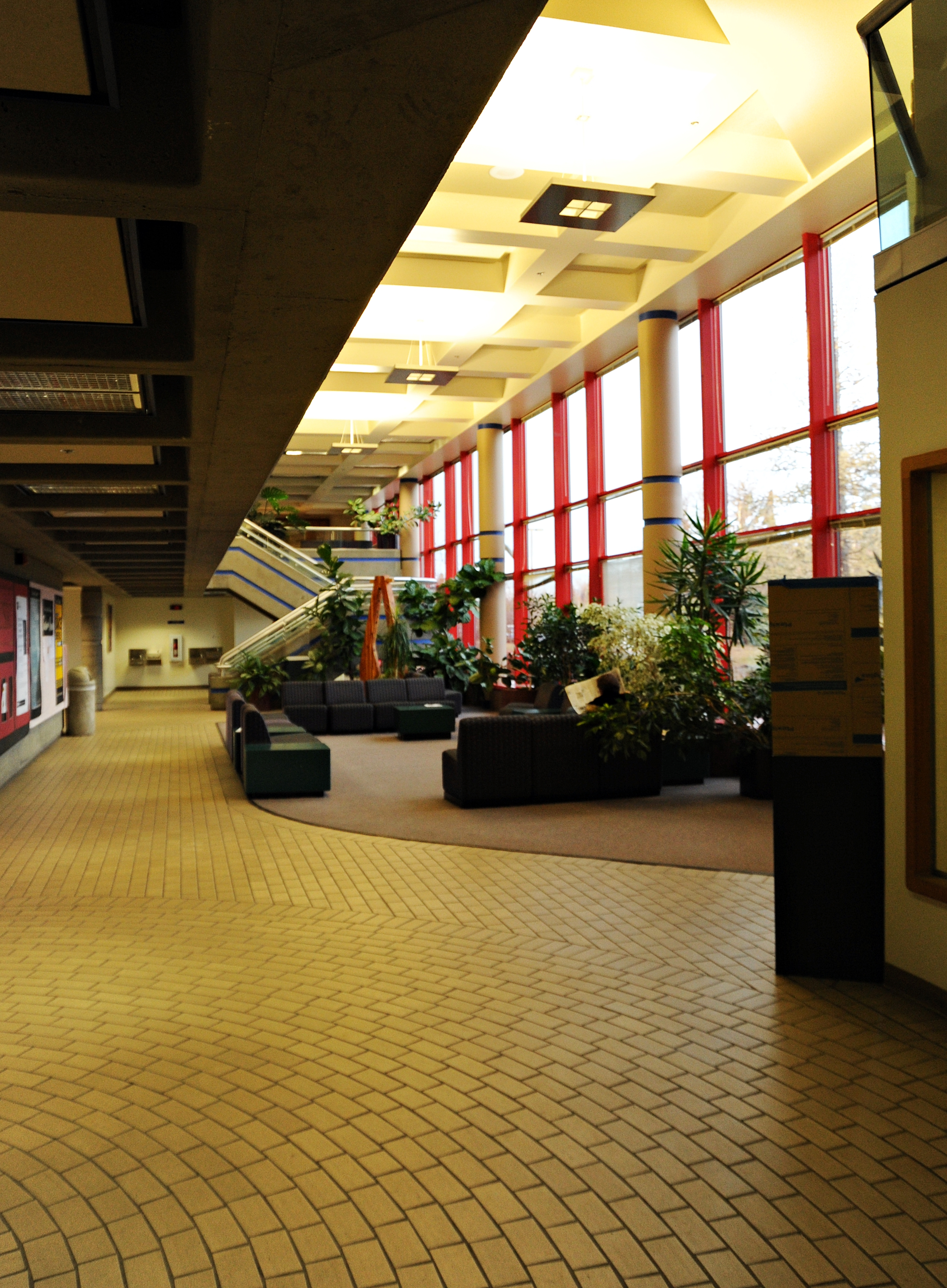
Interior of the Fine Arts Building, University of Alaska Anchorage, Anchorage, Alaska, 1986.
