= UAA/APU Consortium Library =

Library in Alaska, United States

Coordinates: 61°11′26″N 149°49′03″W

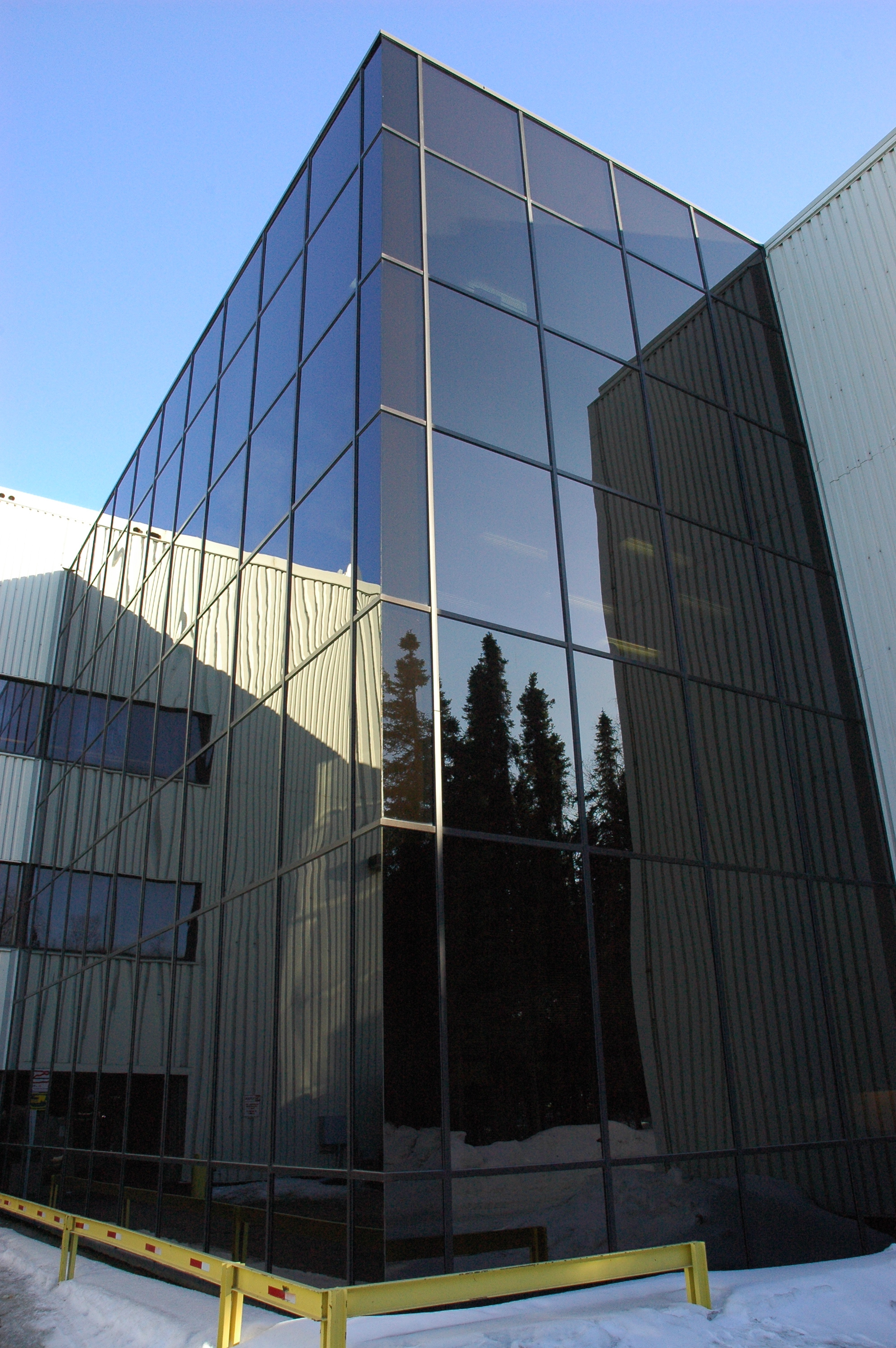
The UAA/APU Consortium Library, built in 1973, and enlarged and renovated 2002–2004, serves both UAA and nearby Alaska Pacific University.

The UAA/APU Consortium Library (Consortium Library) is a joint library serving the University of Alaska Anchorage and Alaska Pacific University, established in 1973 and refurbished in 2004. According to self-reported statistics from 2016, the library has approximately 728,000 volumes on site and averages 12,000 visitors per week during the academic year. The library has the furthest north permanent Foucault pendulum in North America.

The library houses special collections, such as the Alaska Resources Library and Information Services (commonly known as ARLIS) and a large archive dedicated to preserving Alaskan history and the history of the Pacific Northwest. In 2020, the Archives and Special Collections won national recognition when awarded the John Sessions Memorial Award from the American Library Association for its creation of consolidated access to documents relating to labor. The archives also retain materials related to celebrations of historical events in Alaska, such as the centennial celebration of the naming of Mt. McKinley (now known as Denali).

The architect of the original building was CCC/HOK Architects and Planners of Anchorage.
