= Kenneth Maynard =

American architect (1931–2020)

- Born: August 16, 1931; Hackensack, New Jersey, U.S.
- Died: March 5, 2020 (aged 88); Anchorage, Alaska, U.S.
- Occupation: Architect
- Awards: Fellow, American Institute of Architects (1984)
- Practice: Schultz/Maynard; Kenneth Maynard; Maynard & Wirum; Kenneth Maynard & Associates; Maynard/NBBJ Alaska; Maynard & Partch; USKH

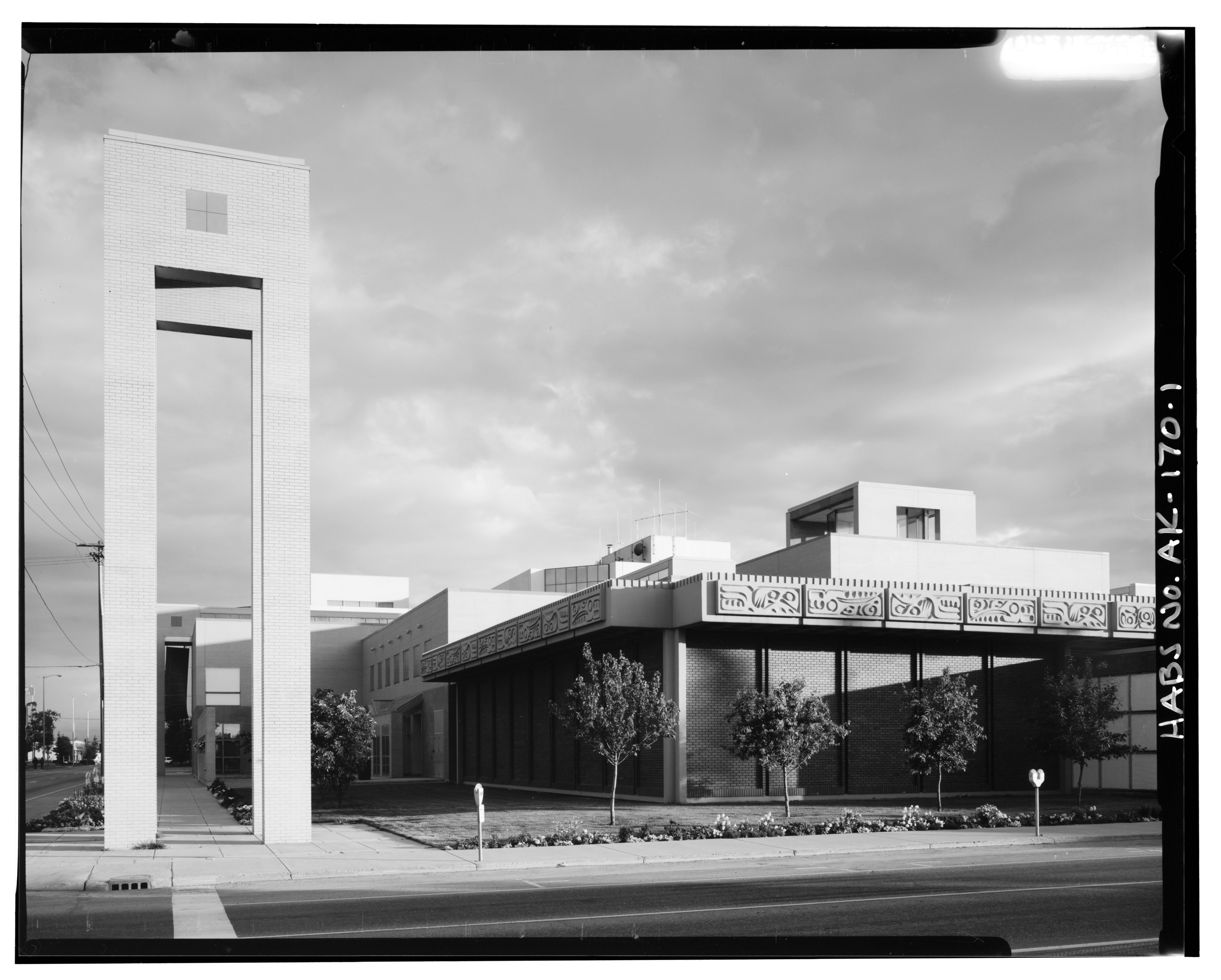
The original building of the Anchorage Museum, designed by Schultz/Maynard with and completed in 1968.

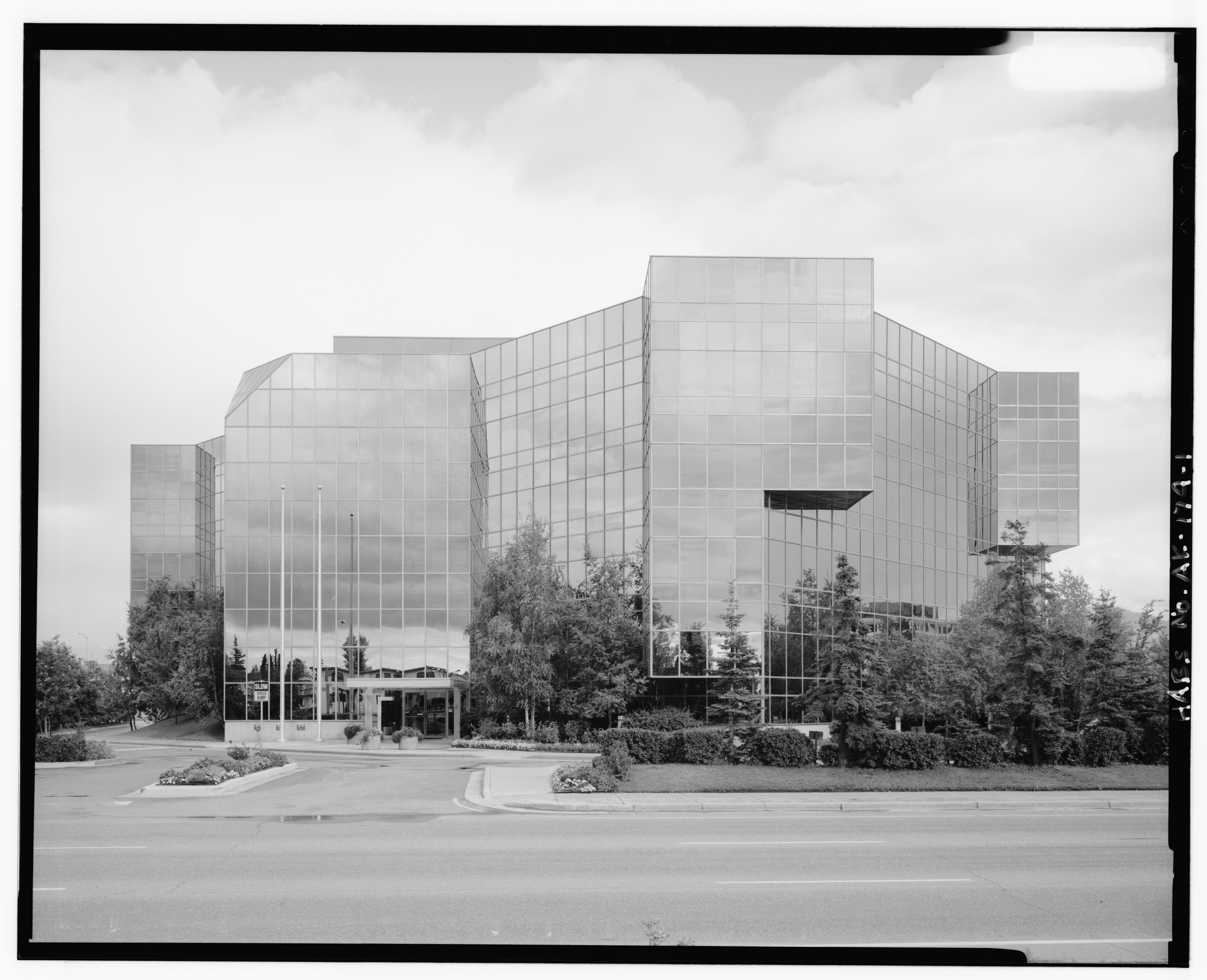
The CIRI Building in Anchorage, designed by Maynard/NBBJ Alaska and completed in 1978.

Kenneth Maynard FAIA (August 16, 1931 – March 5, 2020) was an American architect in practice in Anchorage, Alaska from 1965 to 2011.

== Life and career ==
Kenneth Douglas Maynard was born August 16, 1931, in Hackensack, New Jersey to Douglas Harry Maynard and Eva Maynard, née Whiting, South Africans who moved to the United States during the Great Depression. The family returned to South Africa a few years later, and Maynard was raised and educated in Johannesburg. After finishing school he worked as a drafter for mining company Anglo American plc and for architects Moross & Graff and Pearse, Aneck-Hahn & Bristol in Johannesburg. He received his architectural education at the University of Natal in Durban, graduating with a certificate in architecture in 1958. In 1960 Maynard moved to Anchorage, Alaska, following his brother who had moved there four years earlier. There he joined architects Manley & Mayer, moving to the local office of the Federal Aviation Administration (FAA) in 1961. In 1962 he joined Crittenden, Cassetta, Wirum & Jacobs, the leading firm in the region. Prior to this, Maynard and his wife had considered the move to Alaska as temporary, but permanently settled there in that year.

In 1965 Maynard left Crittenden and in partnership with Lawrance T. Schultz, a coworker from the FAA, he formed the firm of Schultz/Maynard, architects. In association with consulting architects Kirk, Wallace, McKinley & Associates, Schultz/Maynard were the architects of the first section of the Anchorage Museum, opened in 1968. Schultz and Maynard dissolved their partnership the same year, and Maynard practiced under his own name until 1971, when he formed the firm of Maynard & Wirum with Harold Wirum, another former Crittenden associate. Wirum left in 1974 and firm was succeeded by Kenneth Maynard & Associates. In 1976 the firm entered into a three-year association with Naramore, Bain, Brady, and Johanson of Seattle. Maynard disliked the lack of autonomy and dissolved the association in 1978. He then formed Maynard & Partch in partnership with his chief associate, Harold Partch. This was Maynard's longest-lasting partnership, lasting until 1996, when they agreed to an acquisition by USKH, architects and engineers. Maynard was a principal in the firm until his retirement in 2011. USKH was acquired by Stantec three years later.

Maynard joined the American Institute of Architects (AIA) in 1965 as a member of the Alaska chapter. He served in several chapter leadership roles, including president in 1969. He was elected a Fellow of the AIA, the third from Alaska, in 1984.

== Personal life ==
Maynard was married in 1956 to Myrna James in Johannesburg, and they had two children, a son and a daughter, both born in South Africa. Myrna Maynard was well known as a Republican party activist in Alaska and in later life was dubbed "Ms. Republican." She died April 18, 2019, followed by her husband March 5, 2020.

== Architectural works ==
- 1963 – National Bank of Alaska headquarters, (Note: Designed while an associate of Crittenden, Cassetta, Wirum & Jacobs.) 415 E St, Anchorage, Alaska
- 1968 – Anchorage Museum, (Note: The original main building was designed with consulting architects Kirk, Wallace & McKinley and has been demolished. An addition was completed in 1974 and a new main building designed by Mitchell/Giurgola with Maynard & Partch as associate architects was completed in 1986.) 625 C St, Anchorage, Alaska
- 1971 – Kenneth Maynard house, 2237 Forest Park Dr, Anchorage, Alaska
- 1972 – Hotel Captain Cook expansion, 939 W Fifth Ave, Anchorage, Alaska
- 1972 – Kodiak College campus and buildings, Kodiak, Alaska
- 1972 – Whaley School, 2220 Nichols St, Anchorage, Alaska
- 1973 – Baxter Elementary School, 2991 Baxter Rd, Anchorage, Alaska
- 1975 – United States Post Office, 3721 B St, Anchorage, Alaska
- 1977 – CIRI Building, 2525 C St, Anchorage, Alaska
- 1979 – Dale Street Clinic, 4001 Dale St, Anchorage, Alaska
- 1980 – Ocean View Elementary School, 11911 Johns Rd, Anchorage, Alaska
- 1982 – Brady Building, 1031 W Fourth Ave, Anchorage, Alaska
- 1983 – Charter North Hospital (former), 2530 DeBarr Rd, Anchorage, Alaska
- Tikiġaq School, 1837 Tikigaq Ave, Point Hope, Alaska
