= The Northern Light (college newspaper) =

Student newspaper at the University of Alaska Anchorage, Alaska, United States

- Type: Student newspaper
- School: University of Alaska Anchorage
- Editor-in-chief: Hannah Dillon
- Managing editor: Kyle Ivacic
- Founded: September 1988
- Website: thenorthernlight.org

The Northern Light is the student newspaper at the University of Alaska Anchorage. The Northern Light began in September 1988, after the University of Alaska Anchorage and Anchorage Community College merged. The paper is completely produced by students.

The Northern Light has a circulation of 5,000 copies a week during school semesters, making it the third largest weekly in Anchorage. It is financed by student fees and advertising. Every Tuesday, The Northern Light is delivered to stands around campus and Anchorage. It is also mailed to businesses and politicians in Alaska, as well as any public member who requests a copy. The paper consists of five sections: News, Features, Opinion, Arts & Entertainment, and Sports.

The Northern Light is an affiliate of UWIRE, which distributes and promotes its content to their network. It has also been a member of the Associated Press since 1988.

== Awards ==
Since 1993, the staff has won state and national awards for its content, design, photography and website, including over 40 Alaska Press Club awards

- The Associated Collegiate Press Pacemaker in 2011 and 2009 in the non-daily, four year category for general excellence. The Northern Light was also nominated for a Pacemaker in 2000 and 2007
- The website www.thenorthernlight.org was an Associated Collegiate Press Online Pacemaker finalist in 2012.
- 3rd in ACP Best of Show, 2011.
- 2nd best weekly newspaper in Alaska by the Alaska Press Club, 2005.
- Best Website (All media) in Alaska by the Alaska Press Club, 2019.
