= Old Federal Building (Anchorage) =

- Federal Building-U.S. Courthouse
- U.S. National Register of Historic Places
- Alaska Heritage Resources Survey
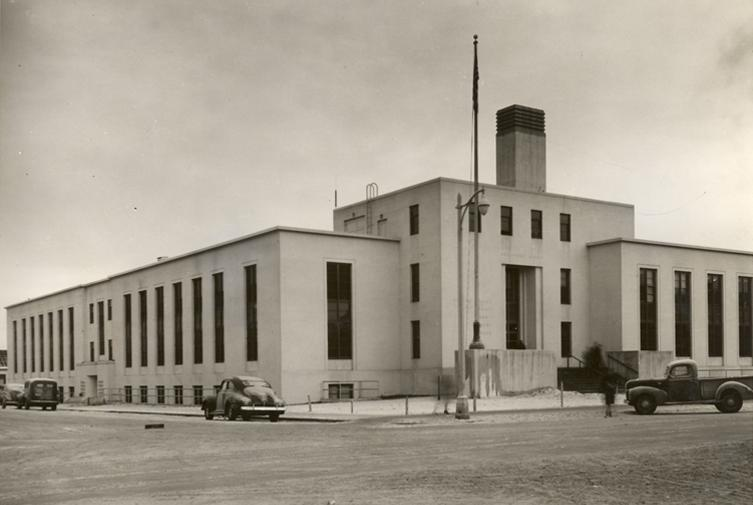
- The Federal Building in Anchorage, Alaska, in 1941

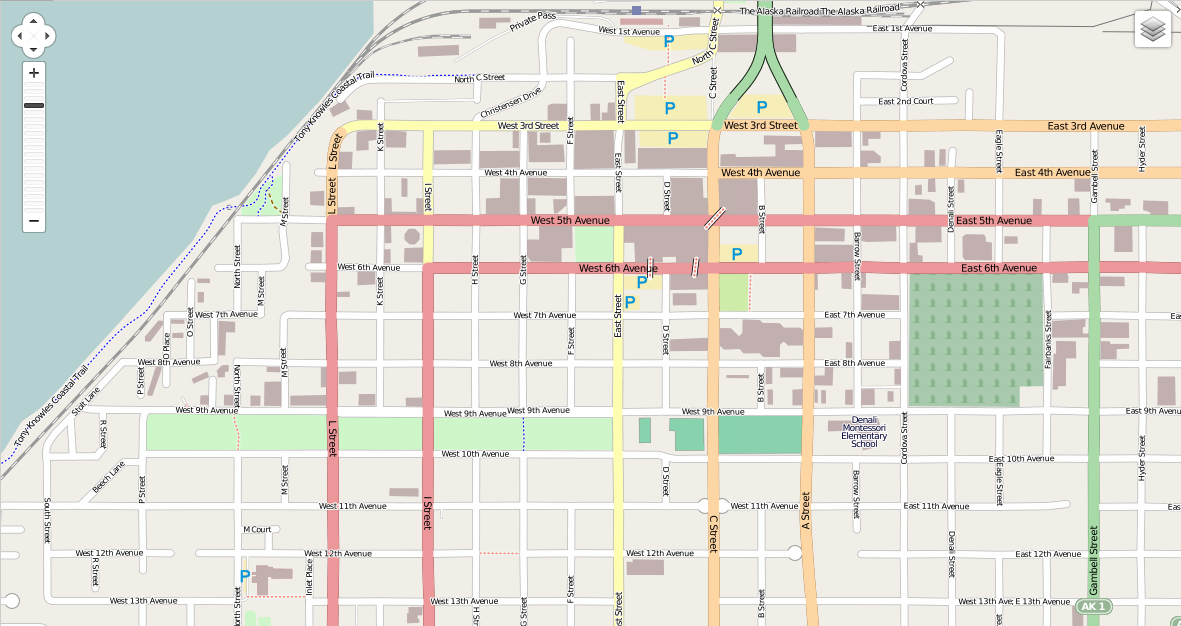
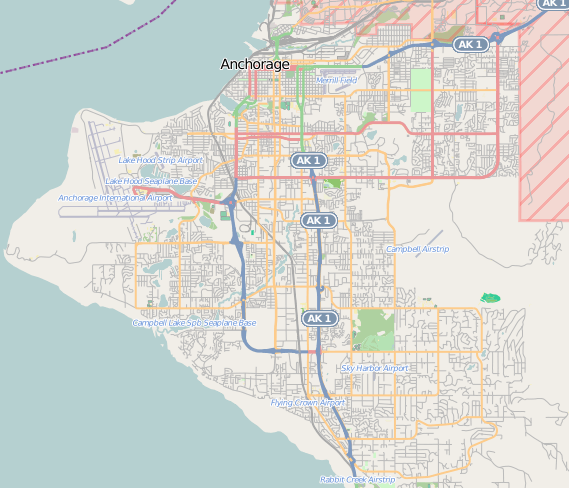
- Location within Downtown Anchorage Location within Anchorage Location within Alaska
- Location: 601 West 4th Avenue, Anchorage, Alaska
- Coordinates: 61°13′8″N 149°53′40″W
- Area: 2.1 acres (0.85 ha)
- Built: 1939
- Architect: Gilbert Stanley Underwood (1939-40 and 1940-41); Edwin Butler Crittenden (1958)
- Architectural style: "New Deal Concrete"
- NRHP reference No.: 78000516
- AHRS No.: ANC-128

Significant dates
- Added to NRHP: June 23, 1978
- Designated AHRS: March, 1977

The Old Federal Building in Anchorage, Alaska is a structure serving primarily as a courthouse of the United States District Court for the District of Alaska. Completed in stages from 1939 to 1941, the building was listed in the National Register of Historic Places in 1978.

== Building history ==
Constructed almost twenty years before Alaska became the forty-ninth state, the Federal Building in Anchorage symbolized the U.S. government's commitment to the economic growth and development of the territory. Providing residents with a post office, courthouse, and other federal services, it was the first large federal building constructed in Anchorage.

This block of Anchorage was designated on the original 1915 plat for the Federal Reserve Bank. The first building erected on the site was a post office, followed by a U.S. Marshals office and territorial jail, which were demolished to make way for the Federal Building. Gilbert Stanley Underwood (1890–1961) designed the original 1939–1940 building and the 1940–1941 west wing addition under the guidance of the Office of the Supervising Architect of the Treasury. Underwood was a Los Angeles-based architect best known for designing National Park lodges. He also designed train stations for the Union Pacific Railroad before he began work for the federal government in 1932. While employed by the supervising architect's office, he designed several federal buildings, including the original portion of the Harry S Truman Building in Washington, D.C. He served as supervising architect from 1943–1949.

The building housed every federal agency with an office in Anchorage, and tenants included the Civilian Conservation Corps, the United States Department of the Interior, the Signal Corps, and the Alaska Railroad. In order to accommodate all of them, the building expanded several times. The first wing extension, completed in 1940–1941, closely followed the original construction and housed the post office. The 1958 courtyard in-fill, a contemporary metal-clad design by Edwin Butler Crittenden, housed the Third District Court. The 1991 addition is home to the National Archives and Records Administration (NARA).

The building served as an early symbol of the federal government to Alaskans, giving them confidence in their acceptance as part of the United States. During celebrations of statehood in 1958, a huge American flag with forty-nine stars literally covered the facade of the building. One star was covered with a larger star to highlight Alaska becoming a state.

== Architecture ==
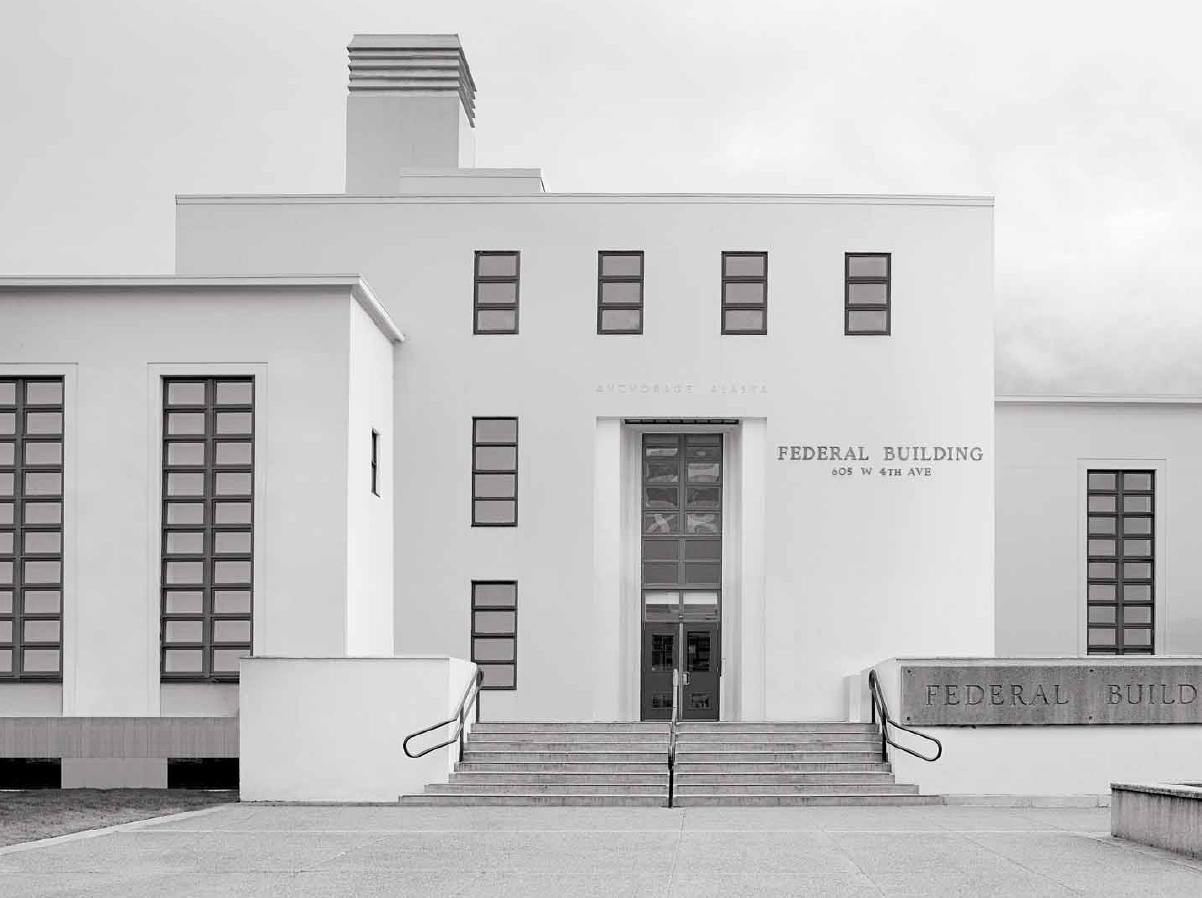
Modern view of the entryway.

The building is a 1930s Modern, cast-in-place reinforced concrete building with a flat roof and parapet. The original plans called for the eventual construction of a square building with a large internal courtyard, beginning with the original portion that formed the south side or base of the square. Before completion of the building in 1940, it became clear that it would not be large enough to accommodate all of the federal agencies in Anchorage, so construction began immediately on the first addition. Thus by 1941, both the base and the original portion of the western wing were complete. The western wing was enlarged and the shorter eastern wing was built later. Subsequent additions filled in portions of the courtyard rather than completing the square. Although they have undergone several alterations, the original facade and both wings of the building retain a significant degree of architectural integrity.

The majority of the building has two stories and a basement. The east and west ends of the south elevation, above the main entry doors, are topped by three-story penthouses. In addition to providing access to the offices within the building, the southeast entrance originally led to the courtroom in the east wing and the southwest entrance to the post office in the west wing. Both wings have two stories and the elevations retain much of their original appearance. The building has little exterior ornamentation. The tall, narrow windows are the most distinctive element of the exterior. Their slightly recessed window frames emphasize the verticality of the windows and the building as a whole, as do the stepped recesses on either side of the main entry doors. The current windows are not original, but the visual effect is consistent with the original appearance.

The interior of the building features many original noteworthy elements, yet displays the same lack of embellishment evident on the exterior. Ceramic tiled wainscoting and quarry tiled floors line the stairwells, entry vestibules, corridors and the original postal lobbies. The stairwells also retain original steel newel posts, wrought iron balusters, and stained wood handrails. The ceramic drinking fountains evident in the corridors throughout the building add to its historic integrity. The entry vestibule ceilings feature stepped cove perimeters. Remaining in place are the light fixtures evident in the original designs for the first floor lobbies and the coffered ceilings original to the first floor corridors. The corridor doors are not original. However, they replicate the original two-panel wood doors with upper panels of glass.

The most significant interior space is the original federal district courtroom on the first floor. This room retains its original stained walnut wainscot and benches, and features an oil-on-canvas mural titled Alaskan Landscape behind the judge's bench. The mural was the work of Arthur Kerrick, who secured a Works Progress Administration commission in 1942. The oil-on-canvas painting was not, however, installed until the 1950s. Five murals were planned for the courtroom, but only the Kerrick mural was completed and installed. Art conservator Peter Malarkey restored the mural in 1993.

== History ==
- 1939–1940: Construction of original building
- 1940–1941: First addition constructed
- 1958: Court facilities addition
- 1978: Listed in National Register of Historic Places

== Building facts ==
- Location: 605 West Fourth Avenue
- Architect: Gilbert Stanley Underwood
- Construction Dates: 1939–1941
- Architectural Style: 1930s Modern
- Landmark Status: Listed in the National Register of Historic Places
- Primary Material: Concrete
- Prominent Features: Tall vertical windows; Rectilinear poured-in-place concrete exterior; Distinguished woodwork; New Deal mural in courtroom

== See also ==
- National Register of Historic Places listings in Anchorage, Alaska
