= Katharine Crittenden =

American historic preservationist (1921–2010)

Katharine "Kit" Crittenden (August 9, 1921 – February 13, 2010) was a historic preservationist in Alaska. She was inducted into the Alaska Women's Hall of Fame in 2011.

The daughter of Reverend Ralph Carson and Katharine Davenport, she was born Katharine Carson in Louisville, Kentucky and grew up in Dayton, Ohio and Bloomington, Illinois. Crittenden studied drama at Illinois Wesleyan University. After graduating, she went to Ketchikan, Alaska to visit a friend from her childhood. There, she met Edwin Butler Crittenden, a lieutenant in the Coast Guard; they were married within a year. The couple moved to the "lower 48" after World War II but returned to Alaska in 1949, settling in Anchorage.

Crittenden devoted her life to the beautification of Anchorage and the preservation of its historical buildings. Among other projects, she played an important role in the creation of the Chester Creek Greenbelt and the Oscar Anderson House Museum. She also helped establish the Urban Design Commission and the Anchorage Historic Preservation Commission, serving as chair for the latter commission for ten years.

She was also the author of Get Mears!: Frederick Mears, Builder of the Alaska Railroad (ISBN 978-0832305511), a biography of Colonel Frederick Mears.

Crittenden died at home in Anchorage at the age of 88.
