= Victoria Crittenden =

Victoria Lynn (Scritchfield) Crittenden
- Born: United States

Academic background
- Education: Bachelor of Arts; Master of Business Administration; Doctor of Business Administration
- Alma mater: Lyon College; University of Arkansas; Harvard Business School

Victoria Lynn (Scritchfield) Crittenden is an American management scientist, academic, and author. She is a Professor of Marketing and Peter M. Black Endowed Faculty Scholar at Babson College.

Crittenden is most known for her studies of strategic marketing, marketing management, marketing & technology, entrepreneurship, & corporate citizenship. She has authored or co-authored over 100 journal publications and has also co-authored three editions of Strategic Marketing Management Cases. She served as Digital and Social Media Marketing and Advertising Collections editor for Business Expert Press. She also served as a co-founding editor of AMS Review from 2008 to 2013.

Crittenden is the editor of the Journal of Marketing Education.

== Education and early career ==
Born on August 30, 1956, Crittenden grew up in Bradford, Arkansas, the youngest of eight children. She received a Bachelor of Arts (1978) from Lyon College (formerly Arkansas College). While attending Lyon College, she served as an intern for the Arkansas attorney general, Bill Clinton. She also assisted in setting up Clinton's initial Gubernatorial campaign offices. She obtained a Master's in Business Administration (1979) from the University of Arkansas, Fayetteville. In 1989, she received her DBA from the Harvard Business School in Boston, Massachusetts.

== Career ==
Crittenden was also a faculty member at the Carroll School of Management at Boston College for 25 years, where she held different positions, including Marketing Department Chairperson for nine years and Chair of the Full-time MBA Core Faculty for three years. She also served as the Academy of Marketing Science President from 2012 to 2014. Between 2013 and 2019, she served as the Chair of Marketing Division at Babson College. During this time, she also held a concurrent appointment by serving on the Alumni Board of Harvard Business School from 2016 to 2019. She was on the Board of Directors of the Direct Selling Education Foundation in Washington DC.

== Awards and honors ==
- 1986 - Doctoral Consortium Fellow, American Marketing Association
- 1986 - Award Winning Track Paper, Academy of Marketing Science
- 1994 - International Directory of Business and Management Scholars and Research, International Directory
- 1998 - Honorary Member, Golden Key Honorary Society
- 1999 - Distinguished Alumna Award, Lyon College
- 1999 - Beta Gamma Sigma, Beta Gamma Sigma Society
- 2000 - Outstanding Reviewer, Journal of the Academy of Marketing Science
- 2004 - Senior Faculty Forum Award, Boston College, Carroll School of Management
- 2005 - Outstanding Marketing Teacher Award, Academy of Marketing Science
- 2008 - Distinguished Fellow, Academy of Marketing Science
- 2013 - Solomon-Marshall-Stuart Award for Innovative Excellence in Marketing Education, American Marketing Association, Teaching & Learning SIG
- 2015 - Fellow, IC² Institute, University of Texas Austin
- 2016 - Fellow, Direct Selling Education Foundation
- 2016 - BFRF Award for Excellence in Scholarship, Babson College
- 2016 - Outstanding Reviewer of the Year Award, Journal for Advancement of Marketing Education
- 2016 - Womanity – Women in Unity, Channel Africa

2025 - World's Top 2% Scientists,

== Bibliography ==
=== Books ===
- Evolving Entrepreneurial Education: Innovation in the Babson Classroom (2015) ISBN 9781785602016
- Go-to-Market Strategies for Women Entrepreneurs: Creating and Exploring Success (2019) ISBN 9781789732900
- Direct Selling: A Global and Social Business Model (2021) ISBN 9781637421130

=== Selected articles ===
- Crittenden, V. L. (2020). Customer support services: More than administrative support – It has to be strategic! European Journal of Marketing, 54(7), 1807-1808.
- Crittenden, V. L. (2020). Educational scholarship: The power of reflecting and sharing. Journal of Marketing Education, 42(2), 91-92.
- Crittenden, V. L., Crittenden, W. F., & Ajjan, H. (2020). Women in sales in developing countries: The value of technology for social impact. Business Horizons, 63, 619-626.
- Crittenden, V. L., & Crittenden, W. F. (2020). Empowering women through micro-entrepreneurship. In W. Leal Filho, A. Azul, L. Brandli, A. Lange Salvia, & T. Wall (Eds.), Encyclopedia of the UN Sustainable Development Goals: Gender equality. Springer, Cham.
- Crittenden, V. L., Beggin, M., Crittenden, W. F., & Dohm, K. (2020). Fostering economic growth in frontier markets: Perceptions in the Tunisian post-Arab Spring. Multidisciplinary Business Review, 13(2), 32-40.
- Crittenden, V. L., Sarstedt, M., Astrachan, C., Hair, J. F., Jr., & Lourenco, C. (2020). Observations on brand measurement in an age of consumer and data complexity. Journal of Product & Brand Management, 29(4), 409-414.
- Crittenden, V. L., Davis, C., & Perren, R. (2020). Embracing diversity in marketing education. Journal of Marketing Education, 42(1), 3-6.
- Peterson, R. A., & Crittenden, V. L. (2020). Exploring customer orientation as a marketing strategy of Mexican-American entrepreneurs. Journal of Business Research, 113(May), 139-148.
- Peterson, R. A., & Crittenden, V. L. (2020). On the relationship between self-efficacy and sales/job performance: Does gender matter? Journal of Selling, 20(2), 5-16.
- Peterson, R. A., Albaum, G., & Crittenden, V. L. (2020). Self-efficacy beliefs and direct selling sales performance. International Journal of Applied Decision Sciences, 13(4), 448-463.
