= Stephen Crittenden =

Australian journalist (born 1963)

- Born: 28 October 1963 (age 62); Sydney
- Presenting career
- Show: The Religion Report
- Station: ABC Radio National
- Style: Religious current affairs
- Country: Australia

Stephen Crittenden is one of Australia's leading religion journalists and a broadcaster for ABC Radio National.

== Early career ==
Crittenden began his radio career as a schoolboy, broadcasting with Sydney's classical FM community radio station 2MBS-FM. After working as a policy officer in the NSW Cabinet Office (1986–88), he joined the Australian Broadcasting Corporation in 1989 as a reporter for ABC Radio Current Affairs.

== ABC Radio journalist and presenter ==
In 1995–96 he was the national arts correspondent for the 7.30 Report, and he later went on to be one of the presenters of Express, a weekly magazine arts program based in Melbourne. In 1999 he was appointed as Executive Producer of ABC Radio's Religion department, a post he held until the beginning of 2002 when he returned to a full-time on air role as host of The Religion Report.

== 2008 suspension ==
In October 2008 Crittenden was suspended from the ABC on full pay after he announced at the start of the Religion Report that the ABC had decommissioned The Ark, In Conversation, Media Report, Perspective, Radio Eye, Sports Factor, Short Story, Street Stories and well as the Religion Report, saying, "The decision to axe one of this network's most distinctive and important programs has been approved by the director of ABC Radio, Sue Howard, and it will condemn Radio National to even greater irrelevance... The ABC's specialist units have been under attack for years, but the decapitation of the flagship program of the religion department effectively spells the death of religion at the ABC."

== Return to air ==
After three months, Crittenden returned to air on the ABC as a reporter on ABC Radio National's current affairs program Background Briefing, and later as a producer on Late Night Live.

From 2014 to 2017 he worked in a senior policy role with the Royal Commission into Institutional Responses to Child Sexual Abuse.
