= Ruth Jefford =

Air taxi pilot, violinist

Ruth Martin Jefford
- Born: July 16, 1914; Des Moines, Iowa, US
- Died: January 9, 2007 (aged 92); Anchorage, Alaska, US
- Known for: Alaska's first female air taxi pilot First licensed female instructor Merrill Field; Founding member Anchorage Symphony Orchestra
- Spouses: Jim Hurst; Jack Jefford

Ruth Martin Jefford (July 16, 1914 – January 9, 2007) was an air taxi pilot in the U.S. state of Alaska and the first woman licensed to be a flight instructor out of Merrill Field. Jefford was a violinist who became a co-founder of the Anchorage Symphony Orchestra. During World War II, she entertained at the United Service Organizations in Alaska and transported medical supplies for the Red Cross Motor Corp. She was the first woman in Alaska to receive the Wright Brothers Master Pilot Award. She was inducted into the Alaska Women's Hall of Fame in 2009.

== Early life ==
Ruth Martin was born July 16, 1914, in Des Moines, Iowa. Her mother arranged flying lessons for the 16-year-old Ruth when they lived in Lincoln, Nebraska, where she learned to solo in instructor Jim Hurst's Arrow Sport airplane. Fellow pilot Jack Jefford recruited Hurst for a job with the Civil Aeronautics Authority. Jack Jefford moved to Alaska in 1937. Ruth married Hurst, and in 1941 the couple moved to Alaska, where he continued with the CAA.

== Alaska ==
When they moved to Alaska, the December 7, 1941 Attack on Pearl Harbor had just happened, and the United States had entered World War II. Early on, she met Lorene Harrison, at the time a choir director for a local church. Harrison, learning that Ruth was a violinist, involved her in the local United Service Organizations (USO) efforts to entertain the military. Harrison would go on to serve on many cultural boards in the state and have a room at the Alaska Center for the Performing Arts named after her. Ruth became part of the Red Cross Motor Corps during the war, delivering medical supplies. Ruth and Jim Hurst bought a 1941 Taylorcraft airplane and began International Air Taxi Service out of Merrill Field. In addition to carrying mail deliveries and transporting people, Ruth became the first female licensed flight instructor operating out of Merrill Field. The couple continued to be business partners, even after they divorced in 1961. In 1971, Ruth married Jack Jefford, and they formed the Valley Air Transport.

In the 1940s, Ruth was one of seven musicians who formed the Anchorage Symphony Orchestra. She spent the next 38 years as the symphony's concert master.

== Death ==
Ruth M. Jefford died on January 9, 2007, and was buried at Anchorage Memorial Park. Jack Jefford died in 1979.

== Awards ==
Ruth Jefford received the Federal Aviation Administration's Wright Brothers Master Pilot Award in 2006, the first woman in Alaska to receive it. The award is granted to certified pilots in the United States who have been deemed to have practiced safe flight operations for 50 years or more. As of July 2012, there were 38 male Alaskan pilots who received the award, but Jefford has remained the only woman in Alaska so honored. She was inducted into the Alaska Women's Hall of Fame in 2009.

In 2009, Jack and Ruth Jefford as a team were inducted into the Alaska Aviation Museum's Hall of Fame.
