= Music of Alaska =

The music of Alaska (Iñupiaq: Alaaskam atuutiŋit) is a broad artistic field incorporating many cultures in the U.S. state of Alaska.

== History and overview ==
Alaska's original music belongs to the Inupiaq, Aleut, Tlingit, and other Alaska Native communities. Russian, English and Irish immigrants brought their own varieties of folk music. Alaska was home to some of the United States' renowned performers, such as the singer Jewel (who had two No. 2 Hot 100 hits, including "You Were Meant for Me" and "Foolish Games"), and Hobo Jim, who was legislatively declared "Alaska's state balladeer". Traditional Aleut flautist Mary Youngblood, singer-songwriter Libby Roderick, the traditional performing group Pamyua, and performing artist Karrie Pavish Anderson also identify as Alaskan. Alaska also has a prominent metal and rock scene. Metalcore band 36 Crazyfists originated in Alaska, as did indie rock bands Portugal. The Man and the Builders and the Butchers.

== Music festivals and ensembles ==
=== Folk ===
The Alaska Folk Festival, held in early April in Juneau is among the state's most well-attended music festivals. The Fairbanks Folk Fest annual "Summer and Winter Music Fests" and the Anchorage Folk Festival are also well known in their areas. The Athabascan Old-Time Fiddling Festival, also held in Fairbanks (since 1983) is described "a testament to the far-reaching appeal of traditional music" in the Country Music Lover's Guide to the U.S.A.; the festival features Athabascan and Inuit fiddlers.

=== Classical ===
The most prominent symphony orchestra in Alaska is the Anchorage Symphony Orchestra. The Fairbanks Symphony Orchestra has served the Interior since 1958, and its traveling arm, the Arctic Chamber Orchestra, regularly tours rural Alaska, as well as occasional international trips. The Juneau Symphony is another notable institution which was founded in 1962. Youth orchestras include the Anchorage Youth Symphony.

Alaska also is home to a notable chamber music festivals, including the Sitka Music Festival Alaska's premier chamber music presenter who has presented in over 42 Alaskan communities with the mission of providing the finest classical Music experience in Alaska through performance and education. The festival is led by Grammy-winning cellist, Zuill Bailey and presents over 30 of the world's leading classical musicians in Alaska each year.

Alaska is also home to the Fairbanks Summer Arts Festival, and the Anchorage Chamber Music Festival. The Juneau Jazz & Classics Festival is a 10-day annual event, offering both formal and informal concerts in classical, jazz and blues music, including workshops for musicians of all ages, youth concerts, outreach activities, and community interaction with the featured artists.

=== Opera ===
The Anchorage Opera is currently the state's only professional opera company, however there are several volunteer and semi-professional organizations in the state as well. The Juneau Lyric Opera, a volunteer company, was founded in 1974 and presents concerts, choral workshops, and fully staged opera in Juneau and Southeast Alaska.

=== Country ===
Country music in Alaska is very popular, in part due to the influx of oilfield employment from the southern US. Popular local groups include the Ken Peltier Band.

=== Rap ===
Alaska began to see a flourishing scene of underground rappers in the late 1990s and early 2000s as the state's black population began to grow steadily. Despite the increase in crime and the presence of drug trafficking, numerous artists began to see their music flourish in both Black and Pacific Islander communities as Alaska became a melting pot of urban culture from the influx of residents from the continental United States.

=== Rock ===
The Anchorage community organizes several festival shows each summer, usually at Cuddy Family Park's small amphitheater. The festivals typically feature performances by local punk, rock, and metal bands, although groups specializing in other genres such as rockabilly and noise have also made appearances. The shows are loosely organized and community driven. Non-musical attractions have included circus acts, auctions, barbecues, and bike sports. Festivals are typically given a unique nickname, rather than sharing a common title (e.g. "Anchorage Festival of Unpopular Music" or "Bunk Rock Picnic").
