= Mary Louise Rasmuson =

American military officer

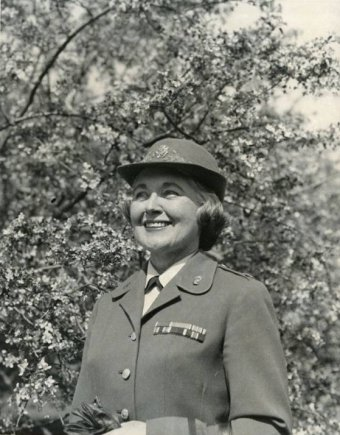
- Born: Mary Louise Milligan Rasmuson; April 11, 1911; East Pittsburgh, Pennsylvania, US
- Died: July 30, 2012 (aged 101); Anchorage, Alaska, US
- Military career
- Allegiance: United States
- Branch: United States Army
- Service years: 1942–62
- Rank: Colonel
- Commands: Women's Army Corps
- Conflicts: World War II
- Awards: Legion of Merit

Mary Louise Milligan Rasmuson (April 11, 1911 – July 30, 2012) was an American army officer, and fifth director of the Women's Army Corps (WAC).

== Life and career ==
Born in East Pittsburgh, Pennsylvania, Milligan graduated with a bachelor's in education from what is now Carnegie Mellon University and received her master's degree in school administration from University of Pittsburgh. She was one of the first two women who were awarded an honorary doctor of laws degree from Carnegie Mellon. Prior to enlisting in the military, she worked as a secretary, teacher, and assistant principal.

She enlisted in the United States Army during World War II, where she started as a private in an experiment using women as military professionals.

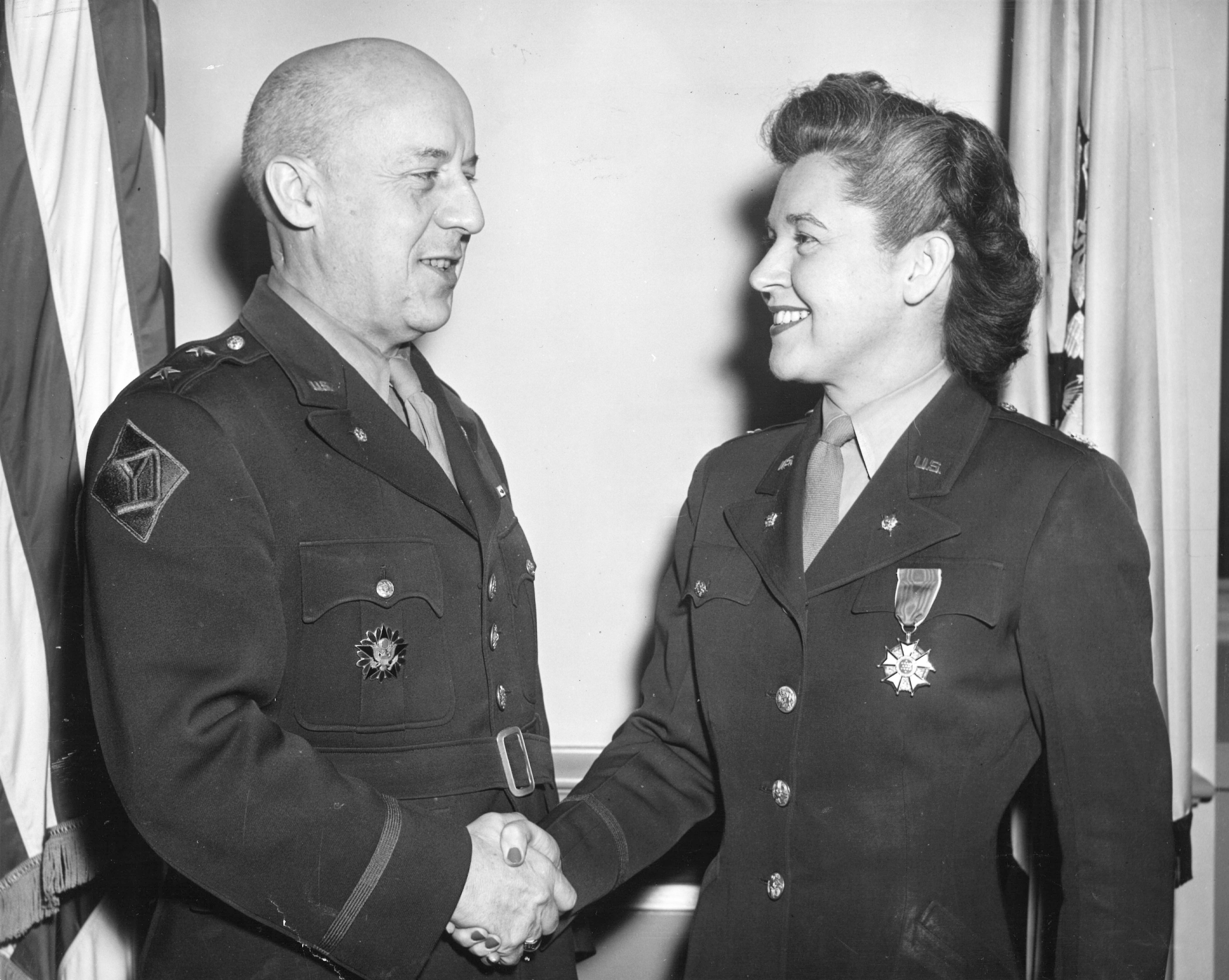
Lt. Col. Mary Louise Milligan receives the Legion of Merit from Maj. Gen. Willard S. Paul, Director of Personnel and Administration, 1946.

She worked up the ranks, and in 1957, President Dwight Eisenhower appointed Milligan director of the Women's Army Corps and in 1961, President John F. Kennedy reappointed her.

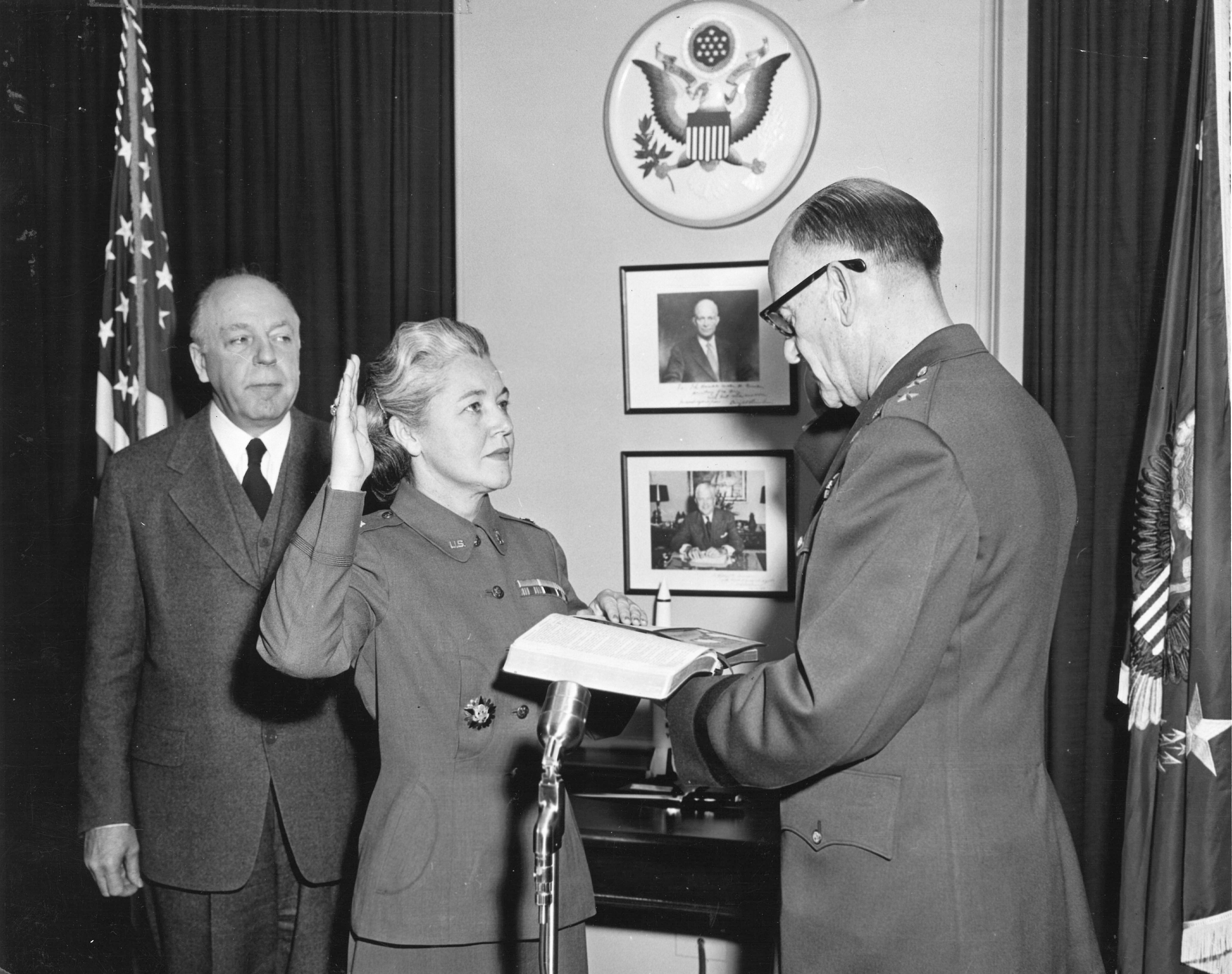
Col. Mary Louise Milligan is sworn in as Director, WAC, by Maj. Gen. Herbert M. Jones, Adjutant General, Department of the Army, on 3 January 1957. Secretary of the Army Wilber M. Brucker is also present.

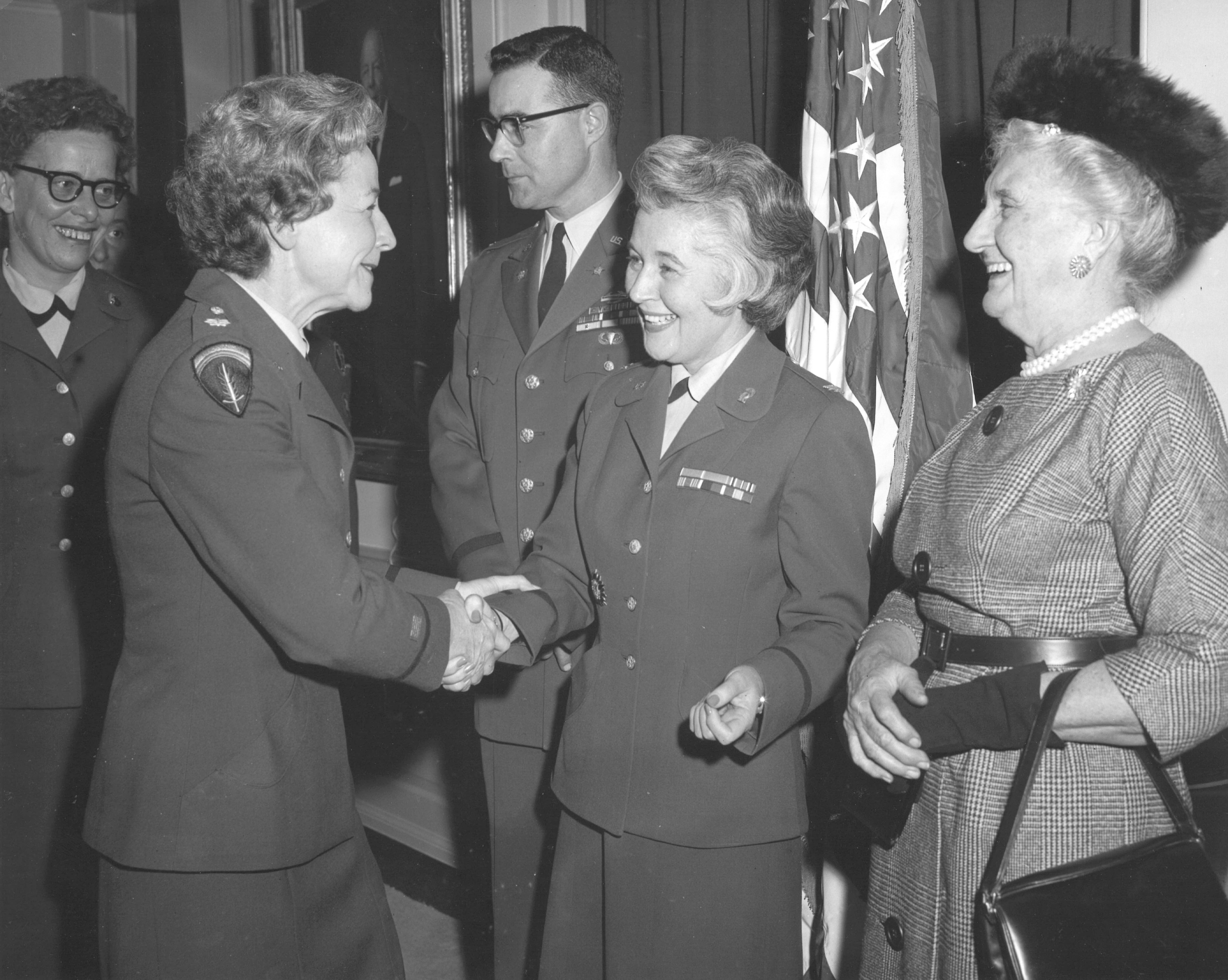
Col. Mary Louise Milligan shakes hands with WAC deputy director, Lt. Col. Lucile G. Odbert, at her reappointment as WAC Director, 3 January 1961. Her mother is on her left.

She was also instrumental in the integration of black women in the Corps, and was awarded the Legion of Merit award for her work. In five and a half years as director, WAC strength increased from 8,300, on 31 January 1957, to 11,100. The Army had opened twenty-six new military occupational specialties (MOSs) for active duty enlisted women and fifty for WAC reservists. New legislation included a provision to eliminate WAC officer promotion restrictions. Congress had granted active duty credit for WAAC time to women with further military service, and it had corrected inequities for WAC reserve officers. Colonel Rasmuson's public relations efforts enhanced the WAC image and helped convince the public and the Army of the value of WAC service.

In 1961, she married Elmer E. Rasmuson, the president of National Bank of Alaska. She was the only WAC director to marry while in office. The following year, she retired from the army and moved to Anchorage, Alaska.

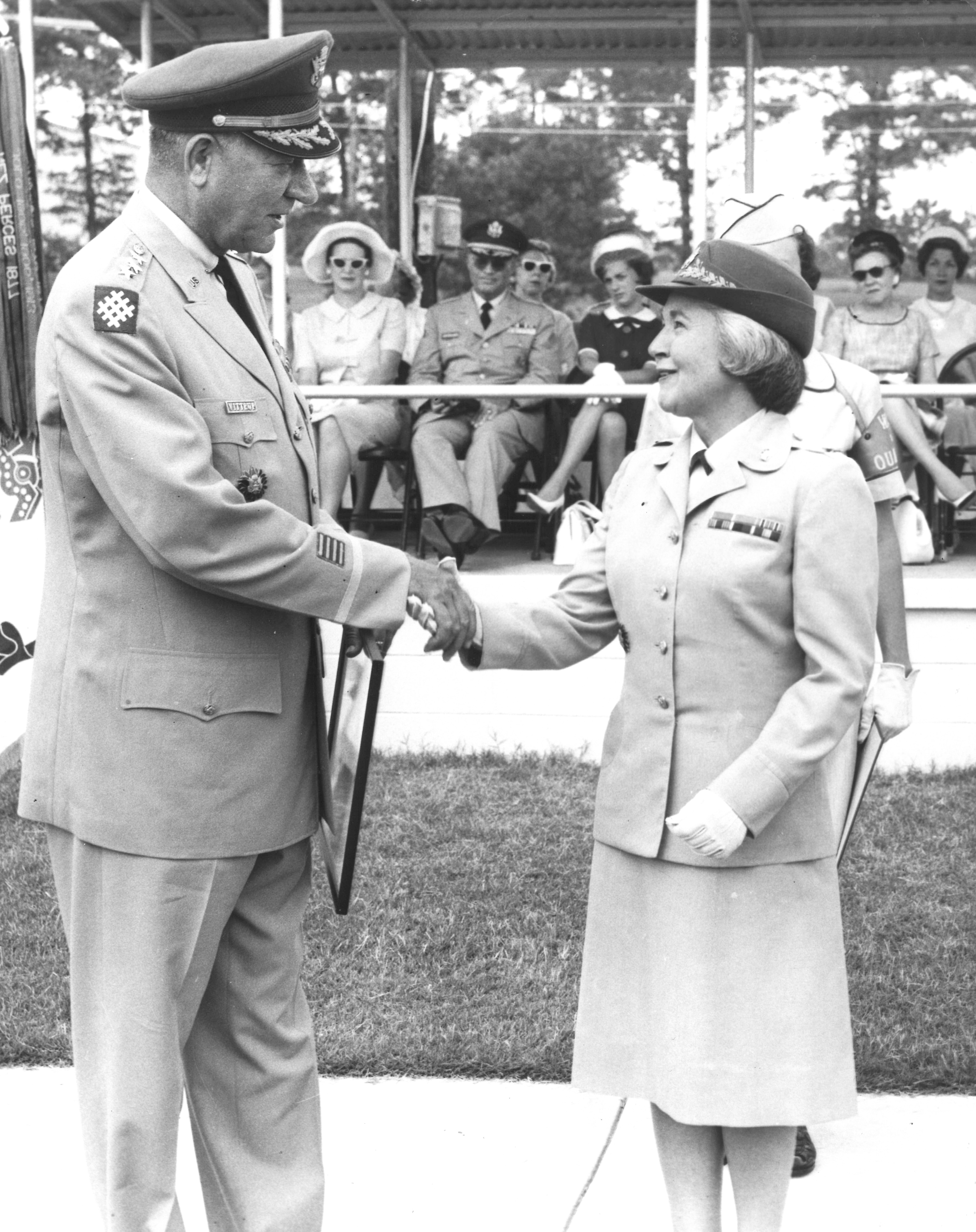
Col. Mary Louise Milligan Rasmuson and Lt. Gen. Russell L. Vittrup, Deputy Chief of Staff for Personnel, Department of the Army, at her retirement at Fort McClellan, 30 July 1962.

After retiring from the army, Rasmuson helped expand her husband's philanthropic efforts, including supporting civil rights, supporting education and cultural life in Anchorage and beyond. She also became a member of several military organizations and boards of the Alaska Crippled Children's Association, American Cancer Society, Anchorage Fine Arts Commission, and Anchorage March of Dimes.

At age 101, Rasmuson died at her home. She is buried in Anchorage Memorial Park Cemetery.

== Television ==
She was the first guest contestant on the February 3, 1957 episode of What's My Line? With one answer left, Dorothy Kilgallen correctly identified her occupation. "Are you head of the whole thing?" she asked.

== Legacy ==
The Rasmusons were influential in establishing and greatly expanding the Anchorage Museum. Her stepdaughter is Connecticut state representative Lile Gibbons.

The Colonel Mary Louise Rasmuson Campus of the Alaska VA Healthcare System was renamed in her honor in 2023.

== Awards ==
- Legion of Merit
- Women's Army Corps Service Medal
- American Campaign Medal
- World War II Victory Medal
- Army of Occupation Medal
- National Defense Service Medal
