= Buddy Tabor =

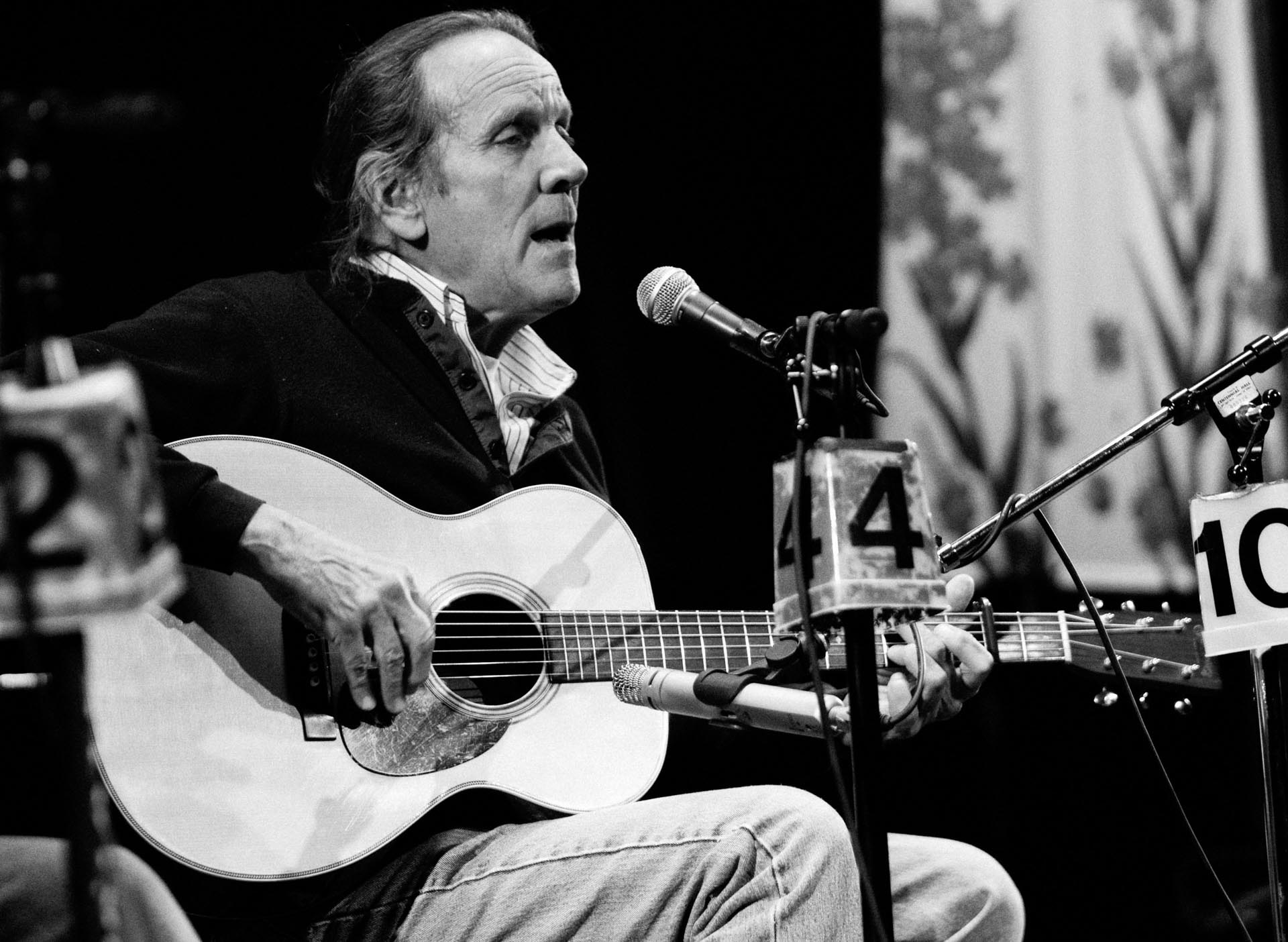
- Buddy Tabor playing live at the Juneau Folkfest on April 17th, 2011

Background information
- Born: March 12, 1949
- Died: February 5, 2012 (aged 62) Juneau, Alaska
- Occupations: Singer, songwriter, poet, house painter.
- Instrument: Guitar * vocals
- Website: https://buddytabor.com/

Guy Edison "Buddy" Tabor Jr. (March 12, 1949 – February 5, 2012) was an American singer-songwriter. He was also a poet, a storyteller and a house painter. His skills as a songwriter received critical acclaim. His style was inspired by artists like Townes Van Zandt, Bob Dylan, Hank Williams, John Prine, Johnny Cash, Leonard Cohen, and Hazel Dickens. Over the course of his career he recorded 9 albums

Buddy was born in Roanoke, Virginia to Guy Edison Tabor Sr. and Marie Geraldine Gardner Tabor. His mother was a homemaker and his father was a sign painter.

In 1960s he hitchhiked across America and eventually landed in Alaska in 1967. There he worked for the Postal Service and the Alaska Railroad on the TransAlaska Pipeline. In 1976 he married Jeannette Chee and they moved to Juneau the following year.

In Juneau, Buddy became ensconced in the Juneau music scene. He was a staple of the Alaska Folk Festival. for decades. Some of his songs include "Blinding Flash of Light", "River Hymn", "Springs of Living Water", "Medicine Song", "Coyote & the Roadrunner" and "Get Up Dogs". He also participated in a regular song circle with other local musicians. And he performed regularly for the inmates of the Folsom Prison in collaboration with poet Marty Williams. This was inspired by the performances by Johnny Cash at the same prison in 1968.

In 2012, Tabor was recognized with a Lifetime Achievement in the Arts in the Juneau Mayor's awards for the arts.

Tabor's career spanned over 40 years in which he opened other singer-songwriters like Dan Bern, Iris Dement, Peggy Seeger, Nancy Griffith and Townes Van Zandt.

His final performance was at the California prison in December 2011.

In March 2024 a group of Buddy's fans began an effort to keep his music alive by releasing his music on a variety of streaming platforms. Buddy's songs are now being covered by other artists. Juneau artist, Josh Fortenberry's covered New Fallen Snow, a song Buddy wrote for Townes Van Zandt.

Discography:

Cannery Lights 1987

Meadowlark 1996

Writing on Stone 1997

Blinding Flash of Light 1998

Abandoned Cars and Broken Hearts 2000

Earth & the Sky 2002

Edge of Despair 2004

Hope... The First Step Toward Disillusionment 2005

Anthology, Vol. I 2007

Anthology, Vol. II 2007

Anthology, Vol. III 2007
