= Lorene Harrison =

American educator and singer (1905–2005)

- Born: Lorene Cuthbertson; 1905; Sterling, Kansas, United States
- Died: 2005 (aged 99–100); Anchorage, Alaska, United States
- Occupations: Singer; Milliner; Educator

Lorene Harrison (1905–2005) was an American educator, singer, choir director, and milliner. In 2009, she was inaugurated into the Alaska Women's Hall of Fame.

== Early life and education ==
Lorene Cuthbertson was born in 1905 in Sterling, Kansas and attended Sterling College. In 1928, she relocated to Anchorage, Alaska to teach music and home economics. She married Jack Harrison, a railroad engineer, in 1930, in Estes Park, Colorado and the couple had two children: Carol Anne and Peggy. She sang frequently, performing at private and public events like weddings and funerals.

== Work ==
Harrison raised her children and taught music and theater and privately tutored singers. After Jack died in 1968, Harrison opened her own boutique in Anchorage, called Hat Box which sold women's clothing and hats. She designed her own hats and she operated the store for 30 years. During World War II, Harrison worked with the United Service Organizations (USO). Ruth M. Jefford played violin in the USO orchestra, after being recruited by Harrison. At the war's end, Harrison started the United Choir of all Faiths which evolved into the Anchorage Community Chorus. She worked with the Anchorage Concert Association, Anchorage Symphony Orchestra, and the Anchorage Opera. As a promoter of music and performer she worked with Eugene Ormandy, Leonard Bernstein, Marilyn Horne, George Szell, Van Cliburn, Fred Waring, and Isaac Stern.

== Later life and legacy ==
The Alaska Center for the Performing Arts named a lobby in Harrison's honor in 1988. During her later years, Harrison lived in the Anchorage Pioneer Home. In 2000, she co-authored a biography with Dianne Barske titled, Mostly Music: The Biography of Alaskan Cultural Pioneer Lorene Harrison, which was written by Dianne Barske. Before her death, a gala was held in her honor at the Alaska Center for the Performing Arts. She died in 2005. She is buried in the Pioneer Tract area of the Anchorage Memorial Park. In 2009, she was inaugurated into the Alaska Women's Hall of Fame.

In 2001, the Anchorage Cultural Council instituted an award named in her honor, which it bestows for lifetime achievements in the arts. Harrison was its first recipient.
