= Anchorage Museum =

Museum in Alaska

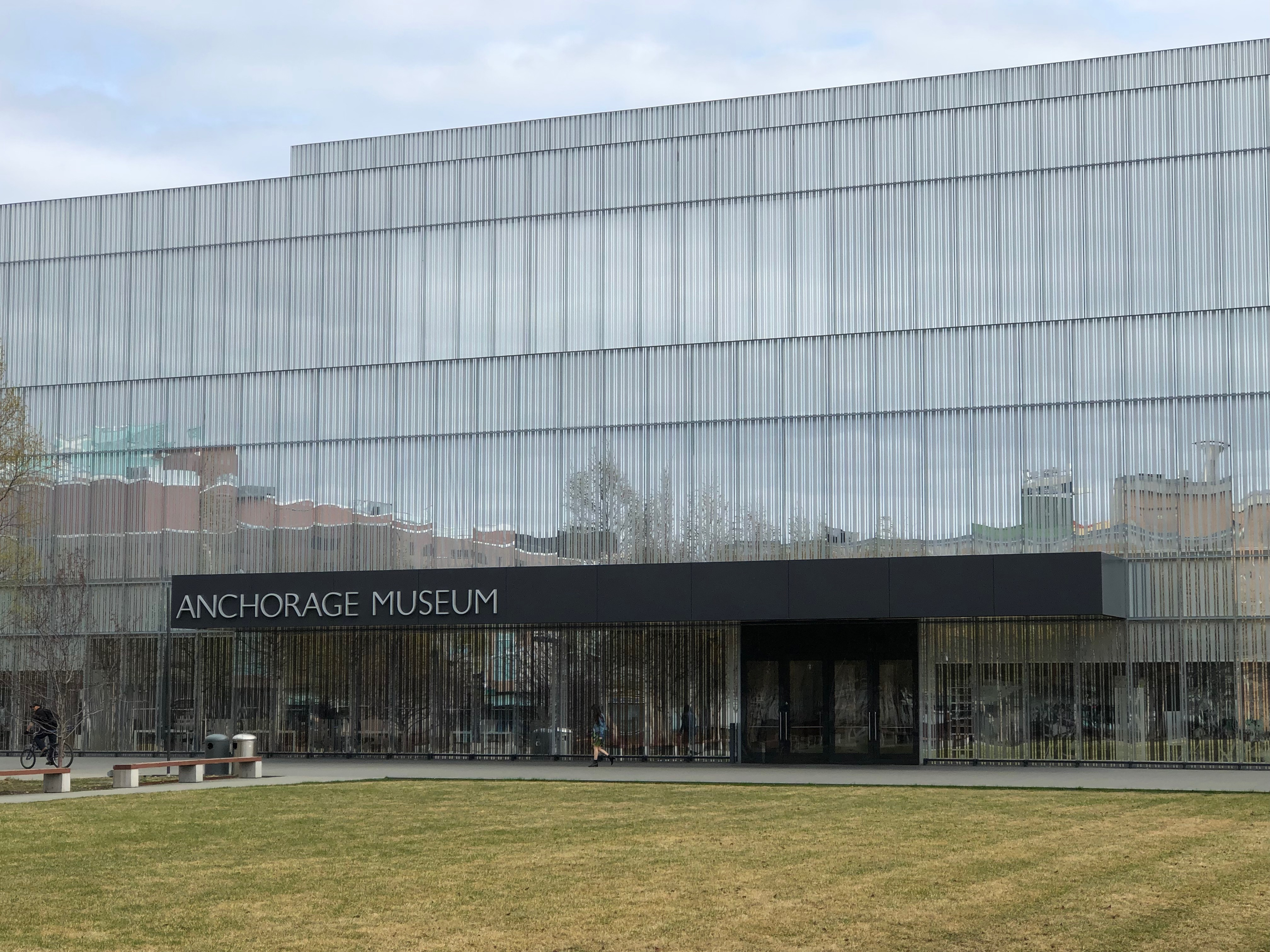
- Main entrance to Anchorage Museum
- Established: July 18, 1968
- Location: Anchorage, Alaska
- Coordinates: 61.2161°N 149.8845°W
- Architect: Mitchell/Giurgola Architects

The Anchorage Museum is a large art, history, ethnography, ecology and science museum located in downtown Anchorage, Alaska. It is dedicated to studying and exploring the land, peoples, art and history of Alaska.

The museum displays material from its permanent collection, along with regular visiting exhibitions.

== History ==
The museum opened in 1968 in a 10,000-square-foot (930 m^{2}) building with an exhibition of 60 borrowed Alaska paintings, a collection of 2500 historic and ethnographic objects, and a staff of two. It was designed by Mitchell/Giurgola Architects. The museum has grown steadily and expanded three times since then, most recently in 2010, to its current size of 170,000 square feet (16,000 m^{2}) with a collection of 25,000 objects and 500,000 historic photographs, and a staff of more than 50. First accredited in 1973, the museum has maintained its accreditation since. In 1992, the museum became the home for the Alaska office of the Smithsonian's NMNH Arctic Studies Center, which supports the museum's mission through research, education, and exhibitions.

== Service ==
The Anchorage Museum is "a world-class museum located in the heart of Alaska's largest city". It welcomes over 180,000 annual visitors from Alaska and from around the world and serves as a cultural center for the community. The museum is repeatedly ranked among Alaska's top ten visitor attractions. Each year it presents 16–20 changing exhibitions complemented by education programs and activities. In 2006, 20,993 students and 47,836 adults participated in education programs.

Permanent exhibits include an Alaska history gallery, Alaska art galleries, the Imaginarium Discovery Center science galleries and the Smithsonian Arctic Studies Center, which features Alaska Native artifacts on long-term loan from the Smithsonian Institution.

The museum's library/archives are in frequent demand by publishers, scholars, and other researchers for its information and images. Titles held in the library are accessible to students, scholars and the public via interlibrary loan on the web.

The Smithsonian Institution's Arctic Studies Center conducts public programs and collaborative research programs to increase understanding of northern peoples, cultures and environments. It develops exhibitions and offers professional museum training workshops frequented by museum and cultural center personnel from across the state.

=== Geographic area served ===
The museum serves its statewide mission by organizing and presenting programs and exhibitions in Anchorage, as well as by traveling exhibitions throughout the state. Examples include exhibits shared with museums in Unalaska, Bethel, Homer, Ketchikan, Kenai, Fairbanks, Kodiak, Eek and Juneau.

The museum provides professional recommendations on collections, exhibitions, education, archival organization and conservation to other Alaska museums, cultural centers and the public.

== Permanent collection ==
The Anchorage Museum has over 40,000 square feet (3,700 m^{2}) devoted to its permanent collection with a focus on Alaska history, Art of the North and Ethnography.

=== Alaska Gallery ===
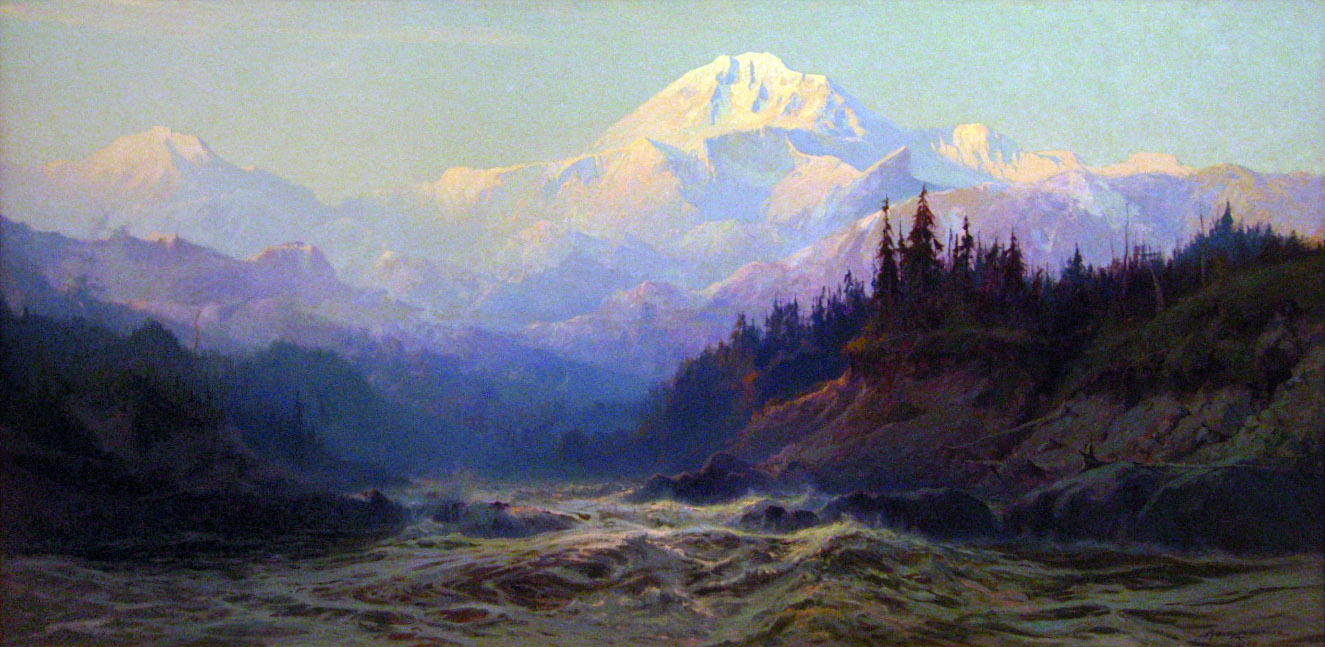
A landscape painting of Denali, the tallest peak in North America by Sydney Laurence on display at the Anchorage Museum

This gallery is devoted to Alaska's rich history from the native fauna through the time of the first early migrations to the present. The Alaska Gallery exhibits more than 1,000 objects and is one of the most complete presentations of Alaskan history and ethnology. Full-scale and miniature dioramas give insight into the lifestyles of Alaska's Native peoples, exploration and settlement by the Russians, the gold rush era, World War II and statehood in 1959.

=== Art of the North ===
The permanent art collection represents the vast range of art from Alaska and the circumpolar North. Seven galleries on the museum's ground floor are devoted to this collection. Exhibits include landscape paintings, drawings from early European expeditions to Alaska, works by contemporary artists, and an entire gallery of paintings by Sydney Laurence, perhaps Alaska's best known artist.

== Exhibitions and programs ==
Exhibitions include juried shows, interpretive exhibitions and traveling exhibitions from other museums. The museum provides a substantial range of exhibits and programs that acquaint Alaskans with the art, culture, history and science of other peoples and places. In recent years, the museum has presented "Wrapped in Pride: Ghanaian Kente and African American Identity", "Tibet: Mountains and Valleys, Castles and Tents", "Woven Treasure: The Coverlets of Norway", and several exhibitions of Korean and Japanese ceramics. The museum also seeks to ensure that its Alaska-focused programming and exhibitions represent the diversity of immigrant heritages in Alaska and the Far North. Public programs include lectures, classes, workshops, films, public and school tours, and special events.

== Governance ==
The museum is operated by the Anchorage Museum Association, a private non-profit organization under a long-term contract with the Municipality of Anchorage. Its annual budget comes from earned income, fundraising and grants, and from the municipality. The municipality owns the museum facility and collections. The Anchorage Museum Foundation, a 501(c)(3) functionally integrated supporting organization, manages the permanent endowment and oversees the expansion project.

=== Staff ===
There are about 50 FTE staff members and they are organized into the following departments: Administration, Information Technology, Building Operations, Collections, Library and Resource Center, Curatorial, Development, Exhibitions, Design, Learning and Engagement, Marketing & Public Relations, Community Outreach, Visitor Services, and Arctic Studies. The onsite personnel for the Smithsonian's Arctic Studies Center include an archeologist and an anthropologist. The museum relies on a robust volunteer program. Over 300 volunteers work as docents and in education, collections, exhibits and library/archives.

== Facilities ==
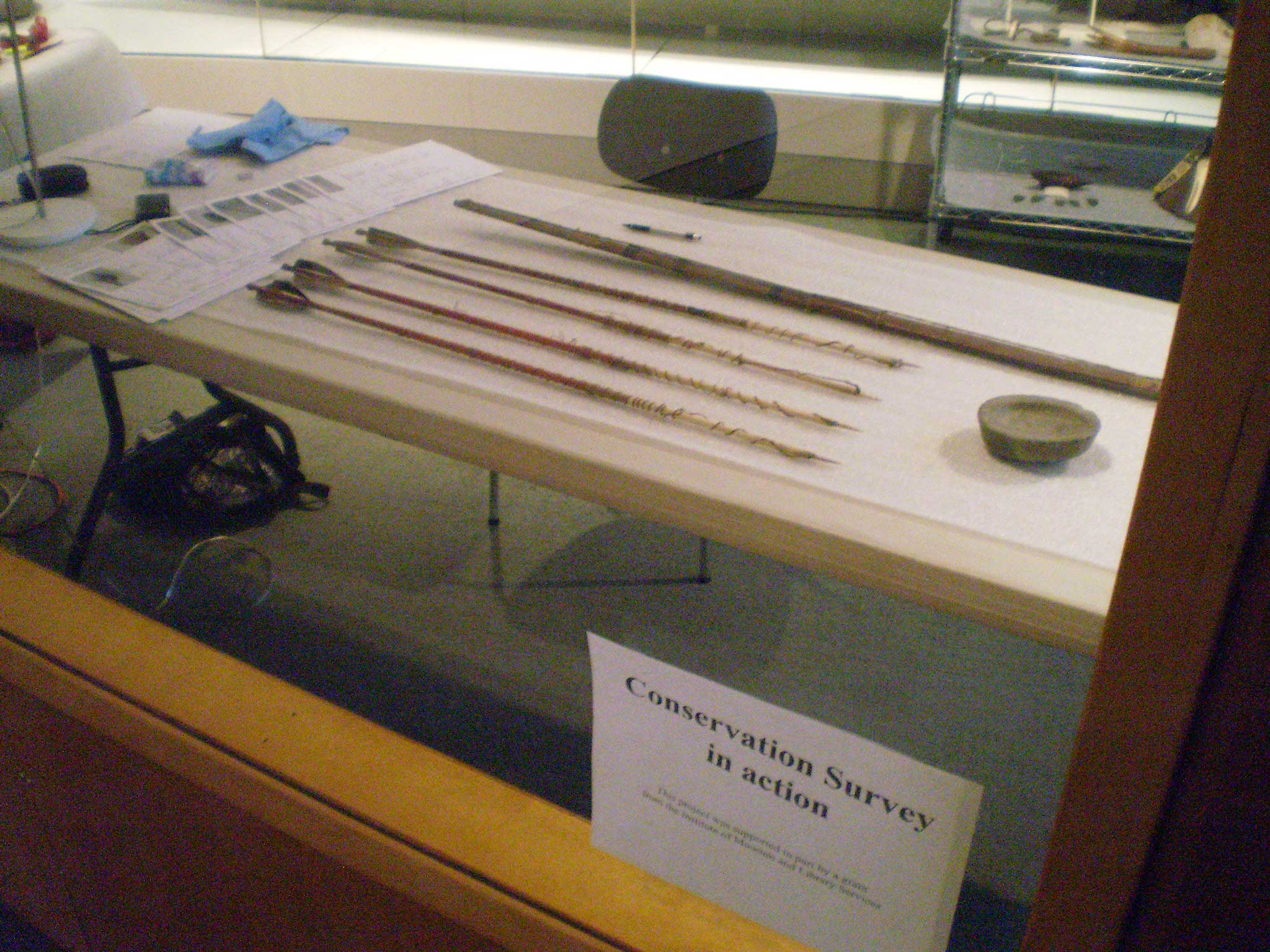
Several Alaska Native arrows and a bow rest in the conservation lab at the museum in late March 2011.

The museum's 170,000 square feet (16,000 m2) include galleries for interpretive exhibitions of its permanent collection and galleries for changing exhibitions. A large atrium, two classrooms and a 230-seat auditorium host a wide variety of programs, classes and special events. Back-of-house includes exhibit prep workshops, collections storage, and workspace, including a conservation laboratory.

== Expansion ==
The new wing features the Smithsonian Institution's Arctic Studies Center, through which 600 Alaskan Native artifacts have returned to Alaska from the National Museum of Natural History and the National Museum of the American Indian for a long-term installation. There also are new galleries for changing exhibitions, an expanded library/archives, and improved visitor services, including Muse restaurant and a gift shop.

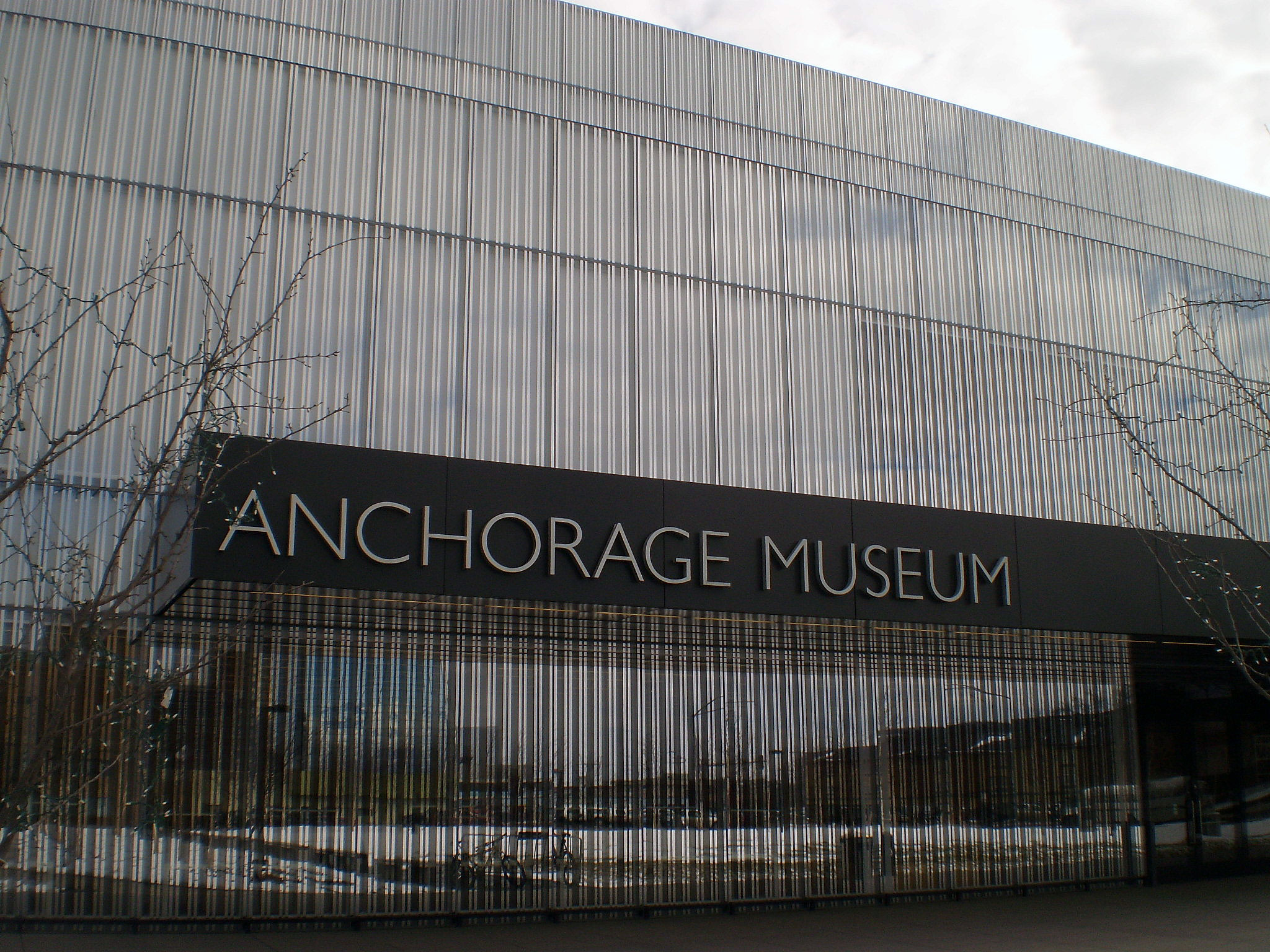
The Anchorage Museum's facade incorporates a large amount of custom insulated fritted glass.

The new extension to the museum was planned by David Chipperfield Architects Ltd., London. It created a new entrance and appearance for the whole museum by implementing a highly unique façade and building set-up. The façade was custom designed and supplied by Overgaard Ltd., Hong Kong to Architectural Wall Systems of West Des Moines, Iowa, a speciality glazing contractor. The scope of materials for this one-of-a-kind façade includes approx. 5900 m^{2} of custom insulated fritted glass. This glazing type and pattern has never before been used and was specially developed for the project by both Architectural Wall Systems and Overgaard Ltd. To meet the extreme environmental conditions the insulated glass units are 24 mm thick. The outside sheet is tempered 6 mm low-iron sheer with a silver mirror frit. The inside sheet is 6 mm low-iron clear sheet. The frit is silver reflective on one side and metallic on the other. All glass units were pre-assembled prior to shipping to allow for easy installation.

== International collaboration ==
The museum is an active member of the University of the Arctic. UArctic is an international cooperative network based in the Circumpolar Arctic region, consisting of more than 200 universities, colleges, and other organizations with an interest in promoting education and research in the Arctic region.
