= William W. Fitzhugh =

American archaeologist and anthropologist

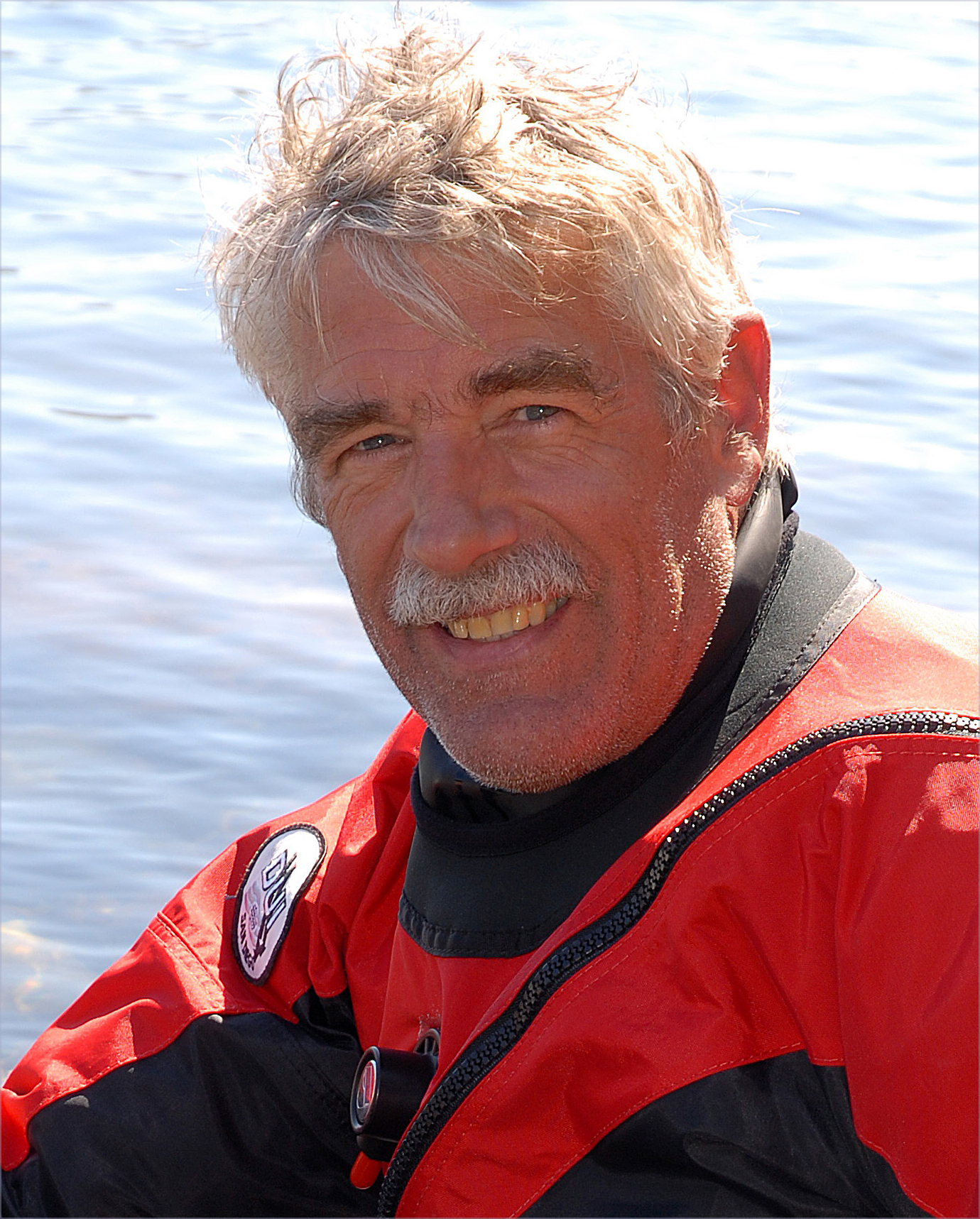
- Fitzhugh in 2009 after a dive in Quebec
- Born: February 1, 1943 (age 83); New York City, US
- Education: Dartmouth College (B.A., 1964); Harvard University (PhD, 1970)
- Spouse: Lynne Fitzhugh
- Scientific career
- Fields: Archaeology, Anthropology
- Workplaces: National Museum of Natural History; Smithsonian Institution

William Wyvill Fitzhugh IV is an American archaeologist and anthropologist who directs the Smithsonian's Arctic Studies Center and is a Senior Scientist at the National Museum of Natural History. He has conducted archaeological research throughout the circumpolar region investigating cultural responses to climate and environmental change and European contact. He has published numerous books and more than 150 journal articles, and has produced large international exhibitions and popular films. Of particular note are the many exhibition catalogues he has had edited, which make syntheses of scholarly research on these subjects available to visitors to public exhibitions.

== Career ==
Fitzhugh attended Deerfield Academy and Dartmouth College, where Professor Elmer Harp introduced him to archaeological fieldwork and Inuit studies in the Hudson Bay region of northern Canada. After two years in the U.S. Navy Fitzhugh entered the graduate program at Harvard University, where he received his PhD in anthropology in 1970 focusing on the environmental archaeology and cultural systems of coastal Labrador. Upon graduating, he took a position at the Smithsonian's National Museum of Natural History (NMNH) as Curator of North American Anthropology. In this capacity, and as founder and director of the Arctic Studies Center, he has spent more than forty years studying and publishing on arctic peoples and cultures of northern Canada, Alaska, Siberia, Scandinavia, and Mongolia.

At the beginning of his career, Fitzhugh focused especially on questions of human adaptations to arctic and sub-arctic environmental change. This research focused primarily on the coastal regions of central and northern Labrador, where successive field expeditions documented the full sequence of culture history and settlement and which involved collaborations with other archaeologists, ethnographers, paleoecologists, and geologists. Early on he developed expertise as well in circumpolar archaeology, pursuing and encouraging comparative research from Scandinavia to Alaska. His field research took him from Labrador to Baffin Island and, more recently, the Gulf of Saint Lawrence, in search of evidence of early Inuit-European contacts.

Fitzhugh's interest in the ethnohistoric sources of northern communities inspired many of the major traveling exhibitions he co/initiated at the Smithsonian Institution, including "Inua: Spirit World of the Bering Sea Eskimo" (1980), "Crossroads of Continents: Cultures of Siberia and Alaska" (1988), "Ainu: Spirits of a Northern People" (1999) and "Vikings: The North Atlantic Saga" (2000). The Viking exhibit was featured in a cover story in Time magazine.

Since 2000, Fitzhugh's research efforts have been directed at investigations of prehistoric Indian and Inuit cultures and European Basque whalers along the Lower North Shore of Quebec near the Labrador border. His interests in the origins of Bering Sea Eskimo culture have also led him to conduct research in northern Russia and Mongolia, where for the past several years he has been investigating reindeer herding along the forest-steppe border between Tuva and Mongolia. His studies of Mongolia's Bronze Age deer stones have suggested possible connections with Scythian art of Western Asia, and to the east, with East Asian and the early art of the Bering Sea Eskimos.

=== Arctic Studies Center ===
In 1988, Dr. Fitzhugh established the Arctic Studies Center (ASC), the only U.S. government program with a special focus on northern cultural research and education. In keeping with this mandate, the ASC specifically studies northern peoples, exploring history, archaeology, social change and human lifeways across the circumpolar world. ASC is part of the Department of Anthropology in the National Museum of American History, a section of the Smithsonian Institution. The Arctic Studies Center curates extensive arctic and sub-arctic ethnology collections, the majority of which were acquired between 1858 and 1890 by naturalists from the Mackenzie District, Ungava, Baffin Island, Coppermine, Alaska and Siberia. Research at the Arctic Studies Center both in Washington, DC, and at its division in Anchorage, AK, seeks to bring ASC researchers together with community scholars in the collaborative exploration of the cultural heritage represented in these collections.

== Honors ==
Dr. Fitzhugh served as Chairman of the Smithsonian's Department of Anthropology from 1975 to 1980 and again in 2002–2005, is an Advisor to the Arctic Research Commission, represents the Smithsonian and arctic social science in various inter-agency councils, served on the Smithsonian Science Commission and holds various other administrative and advisory posts.

== Awards ==
- Case Book Award for Inua: Spirit World of the Bering Sea Eskimo exhibition
- 1984 Stiegler Award, University of Arkansas
- Cine Golden Eagle Award for Secrets of the Lost Red Paint People, 1988.
- Society for American Archaeology Book Award 2001 for Vikings: the North Atlantic Saga
- Viking America (NOVA film) honorable mention, Keil Archaeological Film Festival
- Smithsonian Distinguished Lecturer Award 2003

== Exhibits ==
- Ice Ages Mammals and the Emergence of Man (NMNH 1974)
- Inua: Spirit World of the Bering Sea Eskimo (1982–4)
- Inua: Spirit World of the Bering Sea Eskimo (Alaska, 1983–6)
- Crossroads of Continents: Cultures of Siberia and Alaska (1988–92); Crossroads Alaska/Siberia (1993–96)
- Crossroads Siberia: Native Cultures of Alaska and Siberia (1996–97)
- Native Peoples of the Circumpolar Region (Bonn, 1997–98)
- Ainu: Spirit of a Northern People (1999)
- Vikings: the North Atlantic Saga (2000)
- Arctic: A Friend Acting Strangely (2006).

== Selected publications ==
=== Major books ===
- Environmental Archaeology and Cultural Systems in Hamilton Inlet, Labrador, Smithsonian Contributions to Anthropology, 16. Washington: Government Printing Office. (245 pp., plus maps, illus., tables, plates). 1972
- Inua: Spirit World of the Bering Sea Eskimo. Washington: Smithsonian Institution Press, 296 pp. (with Susan A. Kaplan). 1982 (exhibition catalogue)
- Cultures in Contact: the European Impact on Native Cultural Institutions in Eastern North America, A.D. 1000–1800. Edited by William W. Fitzhugh. Anthropological Society of Washington Series. Washington: Smithsonian Institution Press. 1985
- Crossroads of Continents: Culture of Siberia and Alaska. Edited by William W. Fitzhugh and Aron Crowell. Washington: Smithsonian Institution Press. 360 pp. 1988 (exhibition catalogue)
- Archeology of the Frobisher Voyages. Edited by William W. Fitzhugh and Jacqueline Olin. 288 pp. Washington: Smithsonian Institution Press. 1993
- Anthropology of the North Pacific Rim. Edited by William W. Fitzhugh and Valérie Chaussonnet. 368 pp. Washington: Smithsonian Institution Press. 1994
- Crossroads Alaska: Native Cultures of Alaska and Siberia, edited by V. Chaussonnet. Smithsonian Institution. Project director, William W. Fitzhugh. National Museum of Natural History. Washington: Arctic Studies Center. 1995 (exhibition catalogue)
- Ainu: Spirit of a Northern People. Edited by William W. Fitzhugh and Chisato Dubrueil. 415 pages. Washington DC and Seattle: Arctic Studies Center (National Museum of Natural History) and University of Washington Press. 1999 (exhibition catalogue)
- Vikings: the North Atlantic Saga, edited by William W. Fitzhugh and Elisabeth I. Ward. 424 pages. National Museum of Natural History and Smithsonian Institution Press. 2000 (exhibition catalogue) (Society for American Archaeology Annual Book Award winner for 2001)
- Honoring Our Elders: History of Eastern Arctic Archaeology. A Festschrift to Elmer Harp Jr. Edited by William W. Fitzhugh, Stephen Loring, and Daniel Odess. Contributions to Circumpolar Anthropology, 1. Washington D.C.: Arctic Studies Center, Smithsonian Institution. 2001.
- The Deer Stone Project: Anthropological Studies in Mongolia 2002–2004. Edited by William W. Fitzhugh, J. Bayarsaikhan, and Peter K. Marsh. 256 pp. Arctic Studies Center and the National Museum of Mongolian History. Washington and Ulaanbaatar. (2005)
- Taymyr: The Archaeology of Northernmost Eurasia, by Leonid P. Khlobystin. Translated by Leonid Vishniatski and Boris Grudinko. Edited by William Fitzhugh and Vladimir Pitulko. Contributions to Circumpolar Anthropology, 5. National Museum of Natural History, Smithsonian Institution.

=== Papers ===
- Origins of Museum Anthropology at the Smithsonian Institution and Beyond. In: Anthropology, History, and American Indians: Essays in Honor of William Curtis Sturtevant, edited by William L. Merrill and Ives Goddard. Smithsonian Contributions to Anthropology 44:179-200. Washington: Government Printing Office. (2002)
- Yamal to Greenland: Global Connections in Circumpolar Archaeology. In: Archaeology: the Widening Debate, edited by Barry Cunliffe, Wendy Davies, and Colin Renfrew, pp. 91–144. Oxford: Oxford University Press. (2002)
- Cultures, Borders, and Basques: Archaeological Surveys on Quebec's Lower North Shore. In: From the Arctic to Avalon: Papers in Honour of James A. Tuck Jr. Edited by Lisa Rankin and Peter Ramsden. British Archaeological Reports International Series 1507:53-70. (2006)
- Settlement, Social and Ceremonial Change in the Labrador Maritime Archaic. The Archaic of the Far Northeast. Edited by David Sanger and M.A.P. Renouf. pp. 47–82. Orono: University of Maine Press. (2006)
- North America: Arctic and Circumpolar Regions. Encyclopedia of Archaeology. Edited by Deborah M. Pearsall. pp. 246–271. New York: Academic Press. (2008)

== Films ==
- Secrets of the Lost Red Paint People—1987 European TV, Spofford Films
- Mysteries of the Lost Red Paint Culture—1988 NOVA broadcasts
- Viking America—1994 European TV and 1995 NOVA broadcasts, with Spofford Films
- Baffin Field Notes—with A. Henshaw, Ted Timreck, Spofford Films.
- Leif Eriksson: the Man Who (Almost) Changed History Ward-Chronkite Television
- The Vikings -- History Channel Production 2002
