= Alaska Youth Orchestras =

Musical orchestra organization in Alaska, U.S.

- Orchestra
- Short name: AYO
- Former name: Anchorage Youth Symphony (AYS)
- Founded: 1965
- Location: Anchorage, Alaska, U.S.
- Concert hall: Alaska Center for the Performing Arts
- Principal conductor: Linn Weeda; Anchorage Youth Philharmonic conductor: Tevya Robbins
- Website: www.alaskayouthorchestras.org

Alaska Youth Orchestras (AYO), formerly known as Anchorage Youth Symphony (AYS), is an organization comprising two youth orchestras. It was founded in 1965 as a single orchestra and is located in Anchorage, Alaska. In 2011, due to increased enrollment, the orchestra split into the Anchorage Youth Philharmonic and Anchorage Youth Symphony; the organization's name changed to Alaska Youth Orchestras to reflect this. AYO provides orchestral performance experience for young musicians and furthers musicianship of members through rehearsals, concerts, education, tours, and community involvement. When not on tour, AYO performs at the Alaska Center for the Performing Arts.

== Notable performances and reviews ==
Performances from the 2009 Australia Tour, available online, include:

- Kabalevsky, Poulenc 1st thru 6th movements, and Beethoven's 9th Symphony, 4th movement. (AYS was joined by a Mass Choir for the Poulenc and Beethoven) – Sydney Opera House, July 12, 2009.
- Rimsky-Korsakov – Angel Place, Sydney Australia
- Hanson – Angel Place, Sydney Australia

In February 2008, AYS performed the premiere orchestral performance Kathleen Bielawski's The Thoughtful Bird

In December 2008, AYS performed composer Philip Munger's Memorial to maestro Gordon Wright, "Sinfonietta"

== History ==
In 1963, the Anchorage Borough School District hired Frank Pinkerton, an Eastman School of Music graduate with ten years experience leading the Los Alamos, New Mexico, high school orchestra program. Pinkerton conducted the Anchorage Symphony Orchestra for four years (1963–67), where he incorporated select high school student musicians. On September 23, 1963, Pinkerton submitted a four-year plan to the school district that included the creation of a "symphonic orchestra" for high school students, and set the plan in motion to accomplish that. Twenty months later, Pinkerton founded and conducted the All-School String Orchestra with its first annual concert on May 17, 1965. The orchestra's name evolved into the Anchorage Youth Symphony in 1966 when wind and percussion instrumentalists were added. Pinkerton's successful approach utilized a collaborative model anchored by the Anchorage School District's music programs. As AYS Conductor, Pinkerton oversaw the expansion of opportunities to perform throughout the state, and the Anchorage Youth Symphony's reputation grew steadily.

Dewey Ehling replaced Frank Pinkerton as music director of both the Anchorage School District and the youth symphony. The Anchorage Youth Symphony Association became a 501(c)(3) non-profit in 1981. Until his retirement in 1986, he expanded the touring schedule, traveling and performing nationally and internationally in Washington state, California, Washington D.C., Canada, Great Britain, Australia, and New Zealand.

Linn Weeda, who was a graduate of the youth symphony in those early years, led the orchestra in 1986 and 1987. The orchestra toured and performed in New York City at Lincoln Center during his tenure.

In 1988, John Duff of Fairbanks led the orchestra. During his tenure, the orchestra toured in Scotland. Russell Guyver, a professor of music at University of Alaska Anchorage, succeeded him in 1991. Guyver instituted a series of retreats to encourage the social interaction of members, as well as concerts in the Matanuska Valley.

Linn Weeda was again engaged to be the music director in 1992, and continued in that position for a total of 31 years. It was announced in 2021 that he would step down, due in part to the COVID-19 pandemic. The orchestra's program has expanded to include coaching by local professional musicians (many of whom were in the youth symphony as young players), recording projects, a chamber music series, a chamber orchestra, an alumni association, and scholarships. Master classes are given by visiting artists from the Anchorage Concert Association, Anchorage Symphony Orchestra, and the Sitka Summer Music Festival.

== Mission ==
AYS works to strengthen the performance abilities of its members and the music community throughout Alaska by collaborating with school music programs and with other music and arts groups. AYS provides members with professional direction, coaching, and repertoire.

Many AYS members honed their performance experience as members of Anchorage Junior Youth Symphony. (Some AYS members concurrently perform with the Anchorage Symphony Orchestra.)

Group tours over the years have included Canada, Great Britain, Australia, New Zealand, Washington D.C., Washington state, California, and New York, as well as locations throughout Alaska.

The AYS Music Director/Conductor was Linn Weeda, who studied trumpet with Armando Ghitalla and Roger Voisin and performs with the Anchorage Symphony Orchestra.

== See also ==
- Anchorage Symphony Orchestra
