= Anchorage Memorial Park =

Cemetery in Anchorage, Alaska

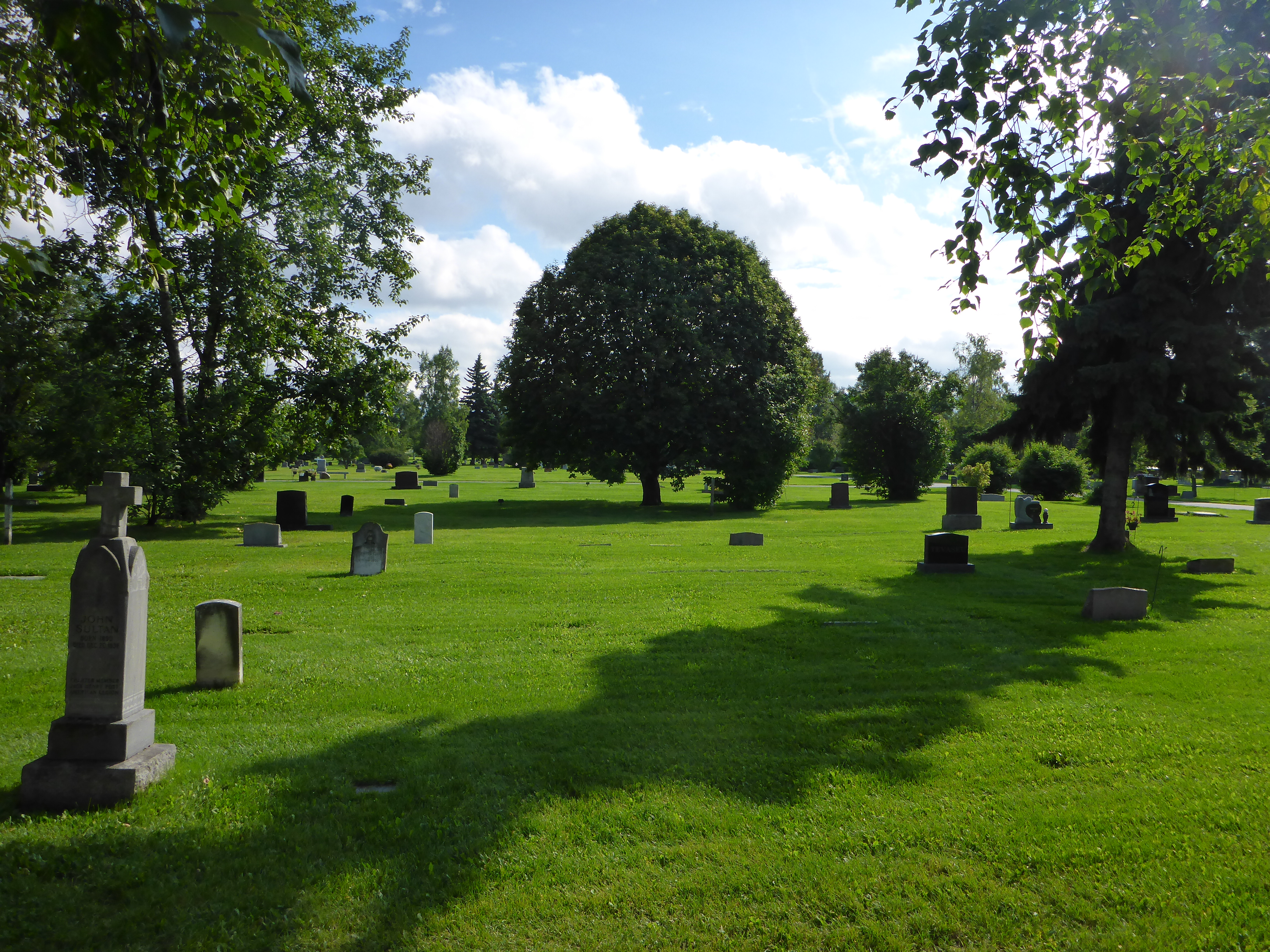
- Interactive map of Anchorage Memorial Park

Details
- Established: 1915
- Location: Anchorage, Alaska
- Country: United States
- Coordinates: 61°12′54″N 149°52′34″W
- Type: Public and private
- Owned by: Municipality of Anchorage
- Size: 22.35 acres (9.04 ha)
- No. of graves: >12,500
- Website: Home page Burial list
- Find a Grave: Anchorage Memorial Park
- The Political Graveyard: Anchorage Memorial Park
- Footnotes: GNIS Data

- Anchorage Cemetery
- U.S. National Register of Historic Places
- U.S. Historic district
- Alaska Heritage Resources Survey
- Location: Anchorage, Alaska
- Coordinates: 61°12′54″N 149°52′34″W
- Area: 22.35 acres (9.04 ha)
- Built: 1915
- NRHP reference No.: 93000320
- AHRS No.: ANC-766
- Added to NRHP: April 26, 1993

The Anchorage Memorial Park, also known as Anchorage Cemetery, is a 22-acre (89,000 m^{2}) cemetery located in Anchorage, Alaska, United States. Covering nine city blocks, the cemetery separates the city's downtown and Fairview neighborhoods.

The cemetery was established by President Woodrow Wilson in 1915 as part of the Anchorage townsite, one of a number of land reserves set aside for public facilities for the new town. It was listed on the National Register of Historic Places in 1993, recognizing its status as Anchorage's oldest cemetery.

From approximately 1954 to 1986, a public housing complex called Willow Park occupied the half-blocks of the cemetery site adjacent to Ninth Avenue and Fairbanks Street. The buildings were razed to allow for expansion of the cemetery. All that remains is the complex's maintenance building, taken over for the same purpose by the cemetery.

== Notable burials ==
- Leopold David (1878–1924), first mayor of Anchorage
- Anthony Joseph Dimond (1881–1953), U.S. congressman
- Lorene Harrison (1905–2005), artist and educator
- Walter Joseph Hickel (1919–2010), U.S. cabinet secretary and Alaska governor. Buried standing up, facing east towards Washington, D.C.
- Ada Blackjack (1898–1983), explorer
- Sydney Laurence (1865–1940), artist
- Howard Wallace Pollock (1920–2011), U.S. congressman
- Mary Louise Rasmuson (1911–2012), fifth director of the U.S. Army Women's Army Corps
- William Alex Stolt (1900–2001), Anchorage mayor

== See also ==
- Angelus Memorial Park, a private cemetery near the Seward Highway in south Anchorage, of similar stature in the community to this cemetery
- List of cemeteries in Alaska
- National Register of Historic Places listings in Anchorage, Alaska
