= Juneau Symphony =

Semi-professional symphony orchestra

The Juneau Symphony is a semi-professional symphony orchestra located in Juneau, Alaska.

== History ==
The Juneau Symphony was founded in 1962 by high school music teacher Cliff Berge and his wife Gladys to give local musicians in Alaska's capital city a platform to perform classical music. First called the Juneau Symphonette, they played their first concert featuring Wagner's Tannhauser overture, at the Juneau's downtown 20th Century Theater. Later called the Juneau Little Symphony and eventually just the Juneau Symphony, the orchestra has performed concerts to Juneau and other Southeast community audiences ever since. In 1976 the Juneau Symphony created its first board of directors and in 1981 organized as a 501(c)3 non-profit.

The Juneau Symphony relies on the talents of local musicians to fill most of the 70 players needed but welcomes other musicians from Alaska and the Pacific Northwest to strengthen sections and fill gaps in instrumentation. The symphony has collaborated with other local arts groups including the Juneau Lyric Opera, Perseverance Theater, International Folk Dancers, and the Juneau Oratorio Choir. A Children's Concert with the local schools was added in 1980 and has been incorporated into the schedule including the winner of the symphony's annual youth concerto competition. The symphony performed in 1987 at the inaugural ceremony for Alaska governor Steve Cowper and former governor Jay Hammond narrated Copland's Lincoln Portrait in 1997. Most mainstage performances take place at the Juneau-Douglas High School Auditorium. The symphony also sponsors a student symphony and coordinates an annual "Showcase" series of chamber works performed by local musicians. When funds are available, the orchestra has toured Southeast Alaska, beginning with a 1967 concert in Petersburg. The symphony has also performed in Skagway, Sitka, Wrangell, Ketchikan and Haines.

For its first twenty years, the Juneau Symphony relied on volunteer conductors, including Berge, Lawton Hull, Jane Stewart, George Hoyt and Bernie Hendricks. In 1983, the symphony gained its first paid conductor, Mel Flood, with help from the University of Alaska Southeast (UAS). Flood was hired as a full-time faculty member at UAS teaching wind ensemble, conducting and flute, and his duties included conducting the Juneau Symphony. Flood stepped down after 17 years and in 1999 Kyle Wiley Pickett, music director and conductor of the Redding Symphony in northern California, was chosen to lead the symphony into the future.

A versatile musician, Pickett earned his doctorate from Peabody Conservatory and his conducting activities range from symphony to opera, musical theater and choral work. In Juneau, he led the orchestra in classical favorites, including Beethoven's 5th Symphony, Hindemith's Mathis der Maler, Holst's The Planets, and Stravinsky's Firebird. He invited soloists including Alexander Tutanov, Mateusz Wolski, Michal Palzewicz, Annaliesa Place, Ricardo Gallardo and local violin virtuosos Linda and Paul Rosenthal, to perform concertos by Beethoven, Bruch, Tchaikovsky, Brahms, Mozart, Rachmaninoff, Sibelius and others. He also programmed concertos for flute, horn, euphonium, trombone, maracas and djembe. Local musicians Steve Tada, Sally Schlichting, Kathryn Kurtz, Bill Paulick, Jack Hodges and Nathan Bastuscheck were also featured as soloists as were winners of the symphony's annual student concerto competition.

Pickett also formed the Juneau Symphony Chorus to add voices for such works as Beethoven's 9th Symphony, Mozart's Requiem, Mahler's “Resurrection” Symphony, and Wilson Sawyer's Symphony No. 1 “Alaskan.” He inaugurated an annual summer Pops concert series which has featured selections from popular films, musicals and Motown favorites. His pre-performance “Concert Conversations” attracted scores of music lovers to learn more about the selections on the evening's program. Also Music Director for the North State Symphony in Chico, CA, Pickett has guest conducted with other symphonies from Montana to Mexico. In 2013, Maestro Pickett accepted jobs leading symphonies in Topeka, KS, and Springfield, MO, and announced he would step down from the Juneau Symphony after the 2013/14 season. A search for a successor is underway.

== Today ==
The Juneau Symphony has expanded in recent years, featuring a part-time administrator/executive director, over 80 musicians, a full-fledged and multi-tiered student symphony network, and has been advertising out of town for its performances aiming for a more regional audience. The symphony also brings in guest musicians from Seattle and the Pacific Northwest for its concerts for instrumentation where local or regional talent does not exist or suffice.

== See also ==
- Anchorage Symphony Orchestra
- Music of Alaska
