= Anchorage Concert Association =

Non-profit organization of classical music enthusiasts

The Anchorage Concert Association (ACA), founded in 1950 by a group of classical music enthusiasts, is the largest non-profit arts and entertainment presenter in Alaska.

Each year Anchorage Concert Association brings national touring shows and artists to Anchorage. The organization has presented more than 700 music, dance, and theatre performances. The organization has an annual budget of $4 million, 80% of which is earned through ticket sales. Past performers include the Preservation Hall Jazz Band and Suzanne Vega. The organization also worked with Lorene Harrison.
