= Anchorage Opera =

Musical group in Anchorage, Alaska, US

Anchorage Opera (AO) is a professional opera company located in Anchorage, Alaska and is a member of OPERA America. It performs at the Alaska Center for the Performing Arts.

== History ==
Anchorage Opera was one of the first major performing arts institutions established by Americans in the Circumpolar North. The company was officially incorporated as Anchorage Civic Opera in 1962. Lorene Harrison once worked with the opera. Anchorage Opera was the first opera company to perform Behind The Green Door.
