= National Bank of Alaska =

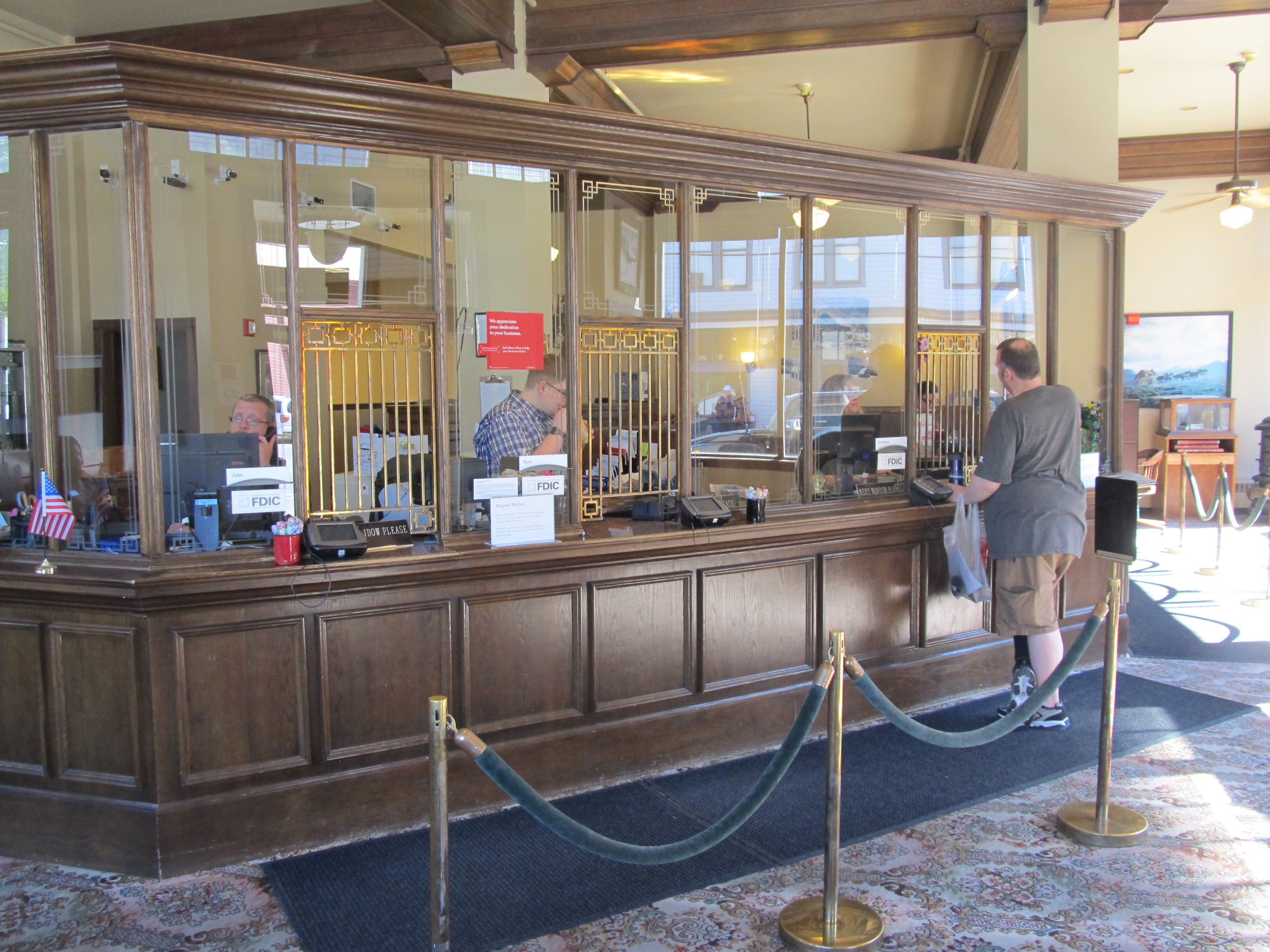
The Bank of Alaska location in Skagway, shown as a branch office of Wells Fargo in 2017. The lobby and teller windows retain decor commonly found in bank lobbies during the early 20th century.

National Bank of Alaska (originally known as Bank of Alaska) was Alaska's largest financial institution for the latter part of the 20th century. In 2000, it was purchased by Wells Fargo, giving the larger bank a presence in 23 states.

== Founding and early history ==
Bank of Alaska was founded in 1916 by Andrew Stevenson in Skagway, Alaska. The bank's first headquarters were in the building previously occupied by the Canadian Imperial Bank of Commerce at Fifth and Broadway, but it soon built a new headquarters one block away at Sixth and Broadway, a building which has remained in the possession of the company and its successors to this day. Bank of Alaska soon opened additional branches in Wrangell and Anchorage, which had just been named.

Edward Anton Rasmuson, who was hired in the first year as the bank's attorney, and his family and descendants long played central roles in the bank's governance. He assumed control in the financial turmoil following World War I, and by 1919, he was serving as the bank's president. His wife, Jenny Olson Rasmuson, sat on the board of directors. In 1945, the bank's headquarters were moved to Anchorage. Rasmuson died in 1949, and left the bank to his son, Elmer E. Rasmuson.

== Expansion ==
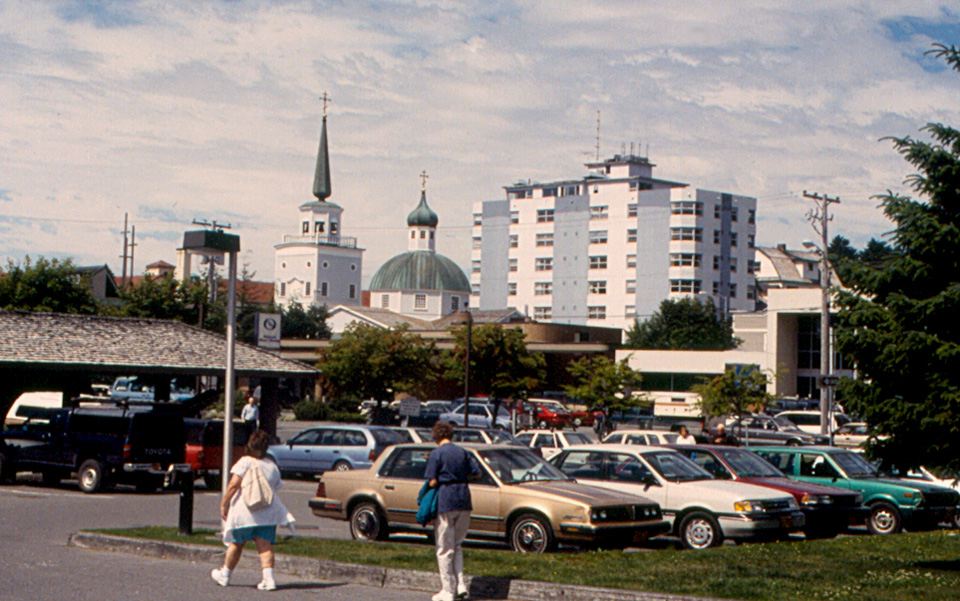
An NBA branch is seen at left foreground in this 1997 photo of downtown Sitka. St. Michael's Cathedral and the Cathedral Apartments are in the background.

In 1950, the bank adopted a national charter, becoming the National Bank of Alaska. A 1960 merger made National Bank of Alaska the largest bank in the state with 19 branches in six locations. Elmer Rasmuson also passed the business to his son, retiring in 1975. Edward Bernard Rasmuson became president and CEO.

By 1978, National Bank of Alaska was operating 34 branches in 19 communities. In 1982, it was reorganized as a wholly owned subsidiary of bank holding company National Bancorp of Alaska. By 1983, its assets topped $1 billion, and by 1990, it owned about half of all bank assets in the state.

== Wells Fargo purchase ==
In December 1999, National Bancorp of Alaska agreed to a $907 million buyout by Wells Fargo & Co. he acquisition transaction closed in 2000 and branches converted to the Wells Fargo brand in June 2001.

== Bibliography ==
- Rasmuson, Elmer E. and Cole, Terrence Banking on Alaska: The Story of the National Bank of Alaska (2 volumes)
