= Alaska Folk Festival =

American annual music celebration

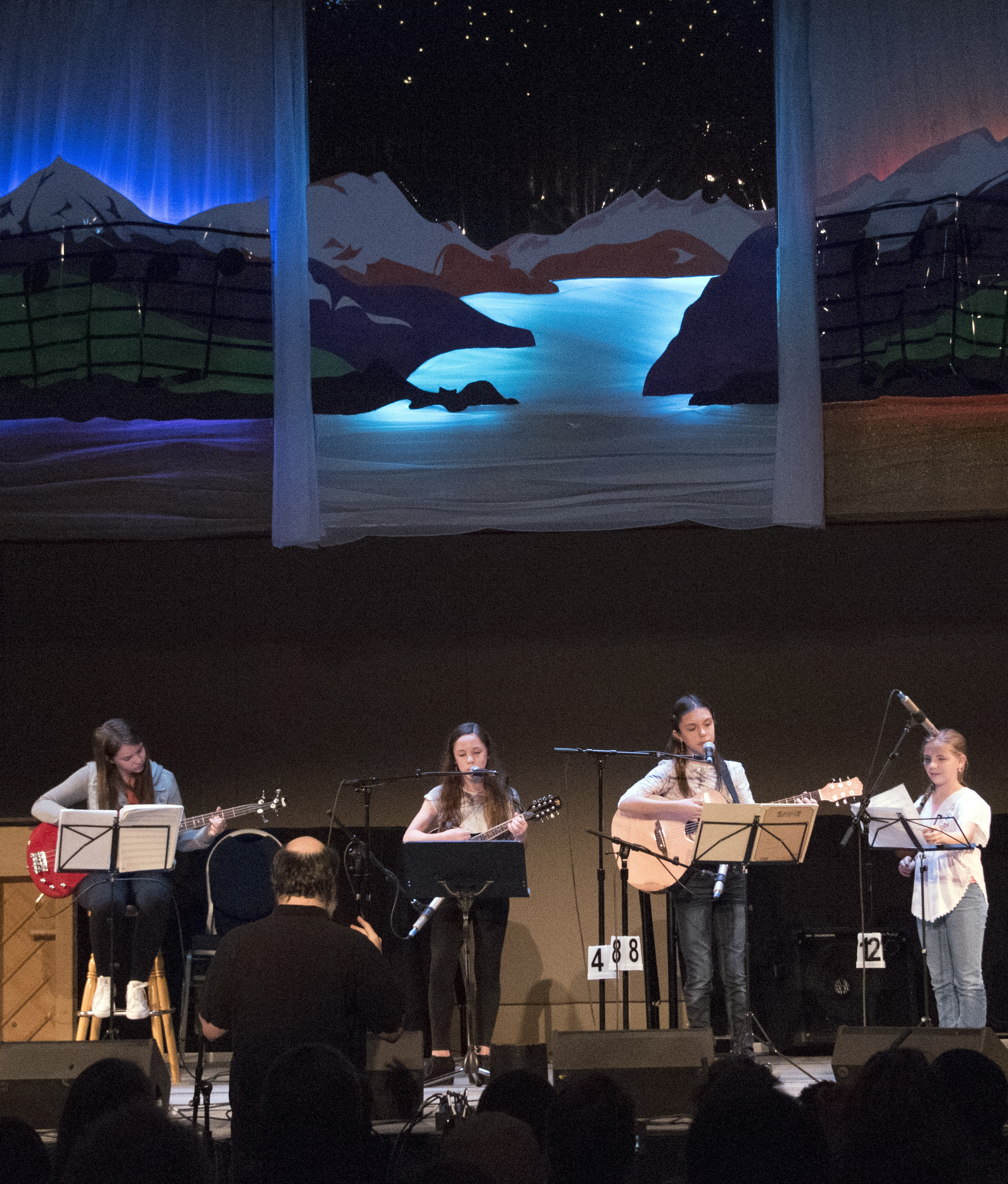
A performance during the 2016 festival by middle school students from Juneau, Alaska

The Alaska Folk Festival is an annual celebration with music from Alaska, the northwestern United States, parts of Canada especially from the Yukon, and other areas of the U.S. It is organized by The Alaska Folk Festival Inc., a non-profit membership organization dedicated to encouraging, supporting, and perpetuating music in Alaska. The festival is held in Juneau, Alaska, almost always in April, lasts a week, and is free to attend. It is supported solely by volunteers and donations (also membership dues). The organization maintains an extensive web archive of past guest artists, festival programs, and poster art (program covers).

The Alaska Folk Festival was established in 1975. Folk music is an important component, but all types of music are encouraged. Some acts include dance and poetry. Each act except guest performers (guest performers get 45-minute sets) is allocated 15 minutes. Limits include no overly long setup times and no recorded music. The festival features performances by a variety of solo artists and musical groups. It provides workshops for people interested in music who want to receive instruction. There are dances, jams, singer-songwriter showcases, and other events. Each year, artwork by an Alaskan artist is featured on posters and merchandise (including the cover art for the program). All events are free to the public, with no auditions for the acts; however, there is a deadline for submissions.

Performers are not paid, except for one guest artist, a guest dance band, and a guest caller, who are selected annually to perform two 45-minute sets, call dances, and lead workshops. There are nine concerts over a week, and about 15 acts perform at each concert. All mainstage performances are broadcast live on local public radio (KTOO-FM and KRNN-FM) and online.

Due to COVID-19 restrictions in Juneau, the festival was canceled in 2020. It was held virtually and broadcast live on YouTube in 2021. The 2025 festival was held April 7-13 and marked the 50th anniversary of the community event.

== See also ==
- Music of Alaska
- Folk Festival
