= Anchorage Symphony Orchestra =

Orchestra in Anchorage, Alaska, U.S.

- Orchestra
- Short name: ASO
- Founded: 1946
- Location: Anchorage, Alaska, U.S.
- Concert hall: Alaska Center for the Performing Arts
- Principal conductor: Elizabeth Schulze
- Music director: Elizabeth Schulze
- Website: www.anchoragesymphony.org

The Anchorage Symphony Orchestra (ASO) is a professional symphony orchestra located in Anchorage, Alaska. The music director was Randall Craig Fleischer until his death in 2020, during the COVID-19 pandemic, after which, Elizabeth Schulze served as artistic advisor and chief conductor while the ASO searched for a new music director. In 2022, Schulze was named as the music director and conductor of the orchestra and embarked on her first official season in that position. Linn Weeda is the assistant director and conductor.

The Anchorage Symphony Orchestra was founded in 1946, more than a decade before Alaska became a state, by a consortium of like-minded musicians looking for a musical outlet. Their first program collaborated with the Anchorage Little Theatre for a production of Charles Dickens's A Christmas Carol. From their original size of 17 members, the ASO grew through the 1950s, hiring Peter Britch as conductor and increasing to 32 members. Anchorage, however, continued to grow, with the development of the City of Anchorage and the North Slope oil fields, as well as with the continued military presence of Elmendorf Air Force Base, and by the 1980s, ASO crossed the threshold as a semi-professional ensemble. Today the organization boasts of an endowment, a board of directors, and 80 audition-entranced musicians in its ranks. In 2001, the symphony garnered the Mayor's Arts Award for an Outstanding Arts Organization and the Governor's Arts Award for an Outstanding Arts Organization.

The Anchorage Symphony performs in the Alaska Center for the Performing Arts in downtown Anchorage. Music educator Lorene Harrison worked with the ASO among other area arts organizations.

== See also ==
- Anchorage Youth Symphony
- Juneau Symphony
- Music of Alaska
