= Sydney Laurence =

American Romantic landscape painter

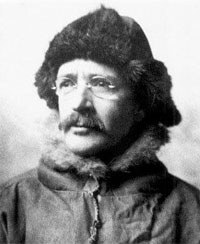
Sydney Laurence in 1914.

Sydney Mortimer Laurence (1865–1940) was an American Romantic landscape painter and (as of 1923) Alaska's most prominent.

== Early life ==
Sydney Mortimer Laurence was born in Brooklyn, New York, and studied at the Art Students League of New York. He married Alexandrina Fredricka Dupre in 1889.

He exhibited regularly by the late 1880s. He and his wife traveled to England, settling in 1889 in the English artists' colony of St. Ives, Cornwall from 1889 to 1898. over the next decade he exhibited at the Royal Society of British Artists and was included in the Paris Salon in 1890, 1894, and 1895, winning an award in 1894.

Laurence came to Alaska in 1903. Most sources wrongly claim that he abandoned his wife and two sons at this time. The Cornwall Artists Index instead states that the couple separated in 1899, and that Alexandrina was recorded as a guest at the St Ives Arts Club in 1912 and 1916. The circumstances surrounding their separation and the motivation for Laurence's move to Alaska are not known.

== Alaska ==
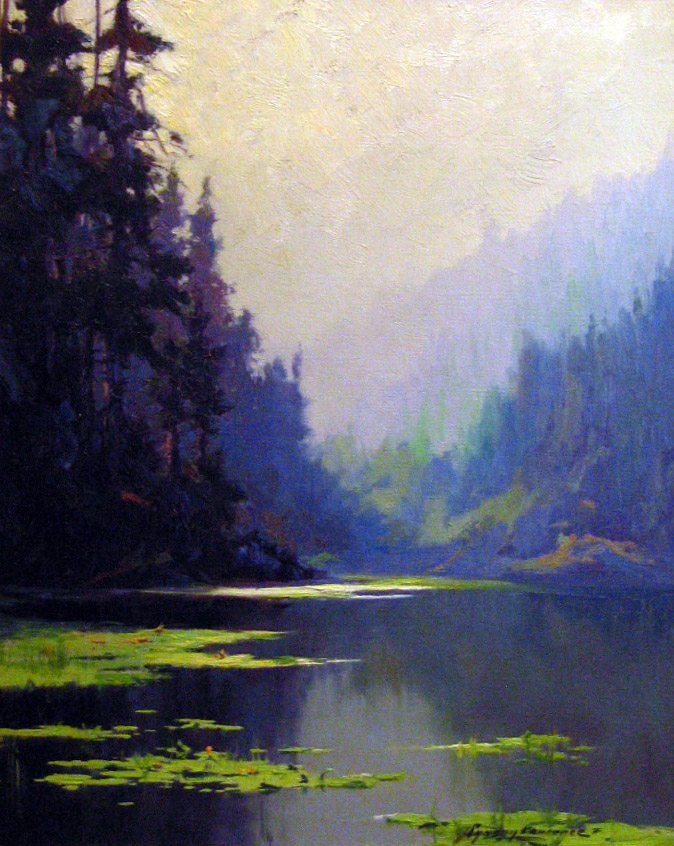
The Silent Pool, 1920-1930. Oil on canvas, 52 cm x 41 cm.

Laurence was the first professionally trained artist to make Alaska his home. He moved to Alaska in 1904 for reasons still unknown. Records from 1907 show he lived in the village of Tyonek on the North Shore of Cook Inlet in Southcentral Alaska, about 60 miles from Ship Creek where Anchorage would begin years later. Living the hard life of the pioneer prospector, he painted little in his first years in the then-District of Alaska, but between 1911 and 1914 he began to focus once again on his art. He moved from Valdez to the nascent town of Anchorage in 1915 and by 1920 was Alaska's most prominent painter.

During his long career Laurence painted a variety of Alaskan scenes, among them sailing ships and steamships in Alaskan waters, totem poles in Southeast Alaska, dramatic headlands and the quiet coves and streams of Cook Inlet, cabins and caches under the northern lights, and Alaska Natives, miners, and trappers engaged in their often solitary lives in the northern wilderness.

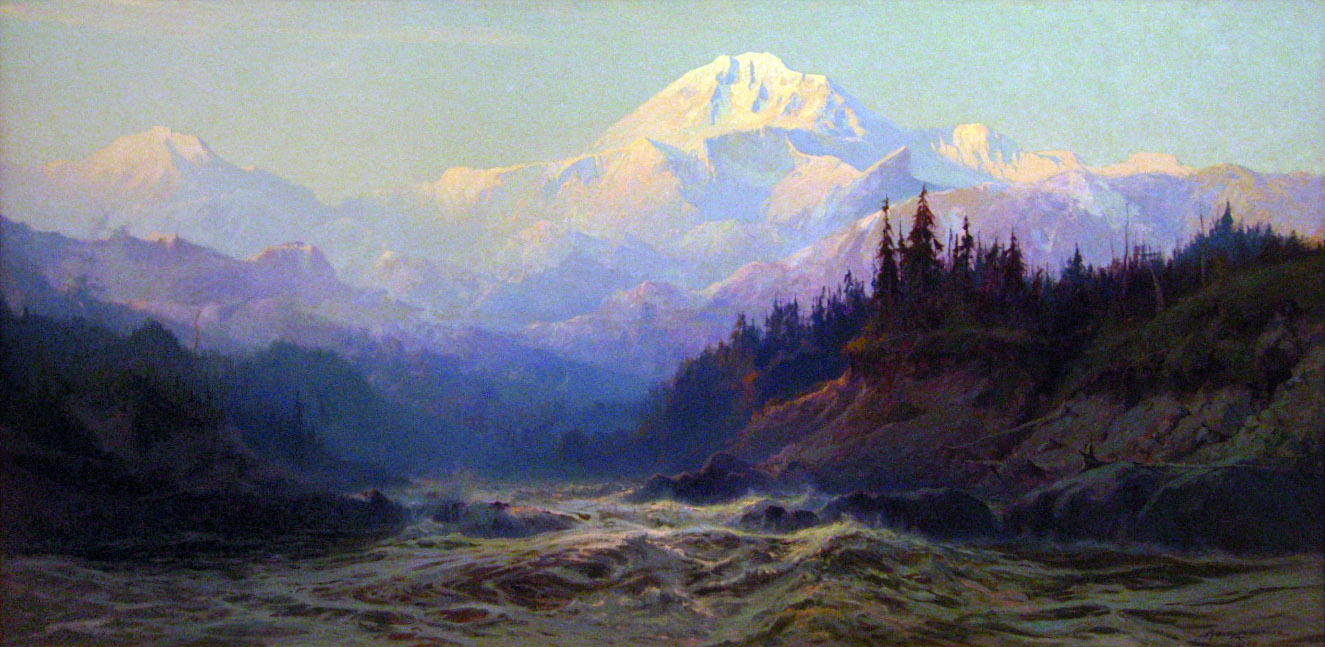
Mount McKinley by Laurence.

The view of Denali from the hills above the rapids of the Tokositna River was a reoccurring subject matter in his work.

In May 1927, Laurence married Jeanne Kunath, a French-born artist who had emigrated to the United States in 1920. He died in Anchorage on December 10, 1940.

Several places were named for Laurence in his adopted hometown. Laurence Court is a short street in the Bootleggers Cove neighborhood of Anchorage. Perhaps the most significant was the Sydney Laurence Auditorium, which sat downtown at the northwest corner of West Sixth Avenue and F Street. This structure was replaced during the 1980s by the Alaska Center for the Performing Arts in what Anchorage called "Project 80s", a large-scale civic improvement program carried out under mayors George M. Sullivan and Tony Knowles; now the Sydney Laurence theater is smallest of three stages at the Performing Arts Center.
