= Alaska Center for the Performing Arts =

Coordinates: 61.21707°N 149.894393°W

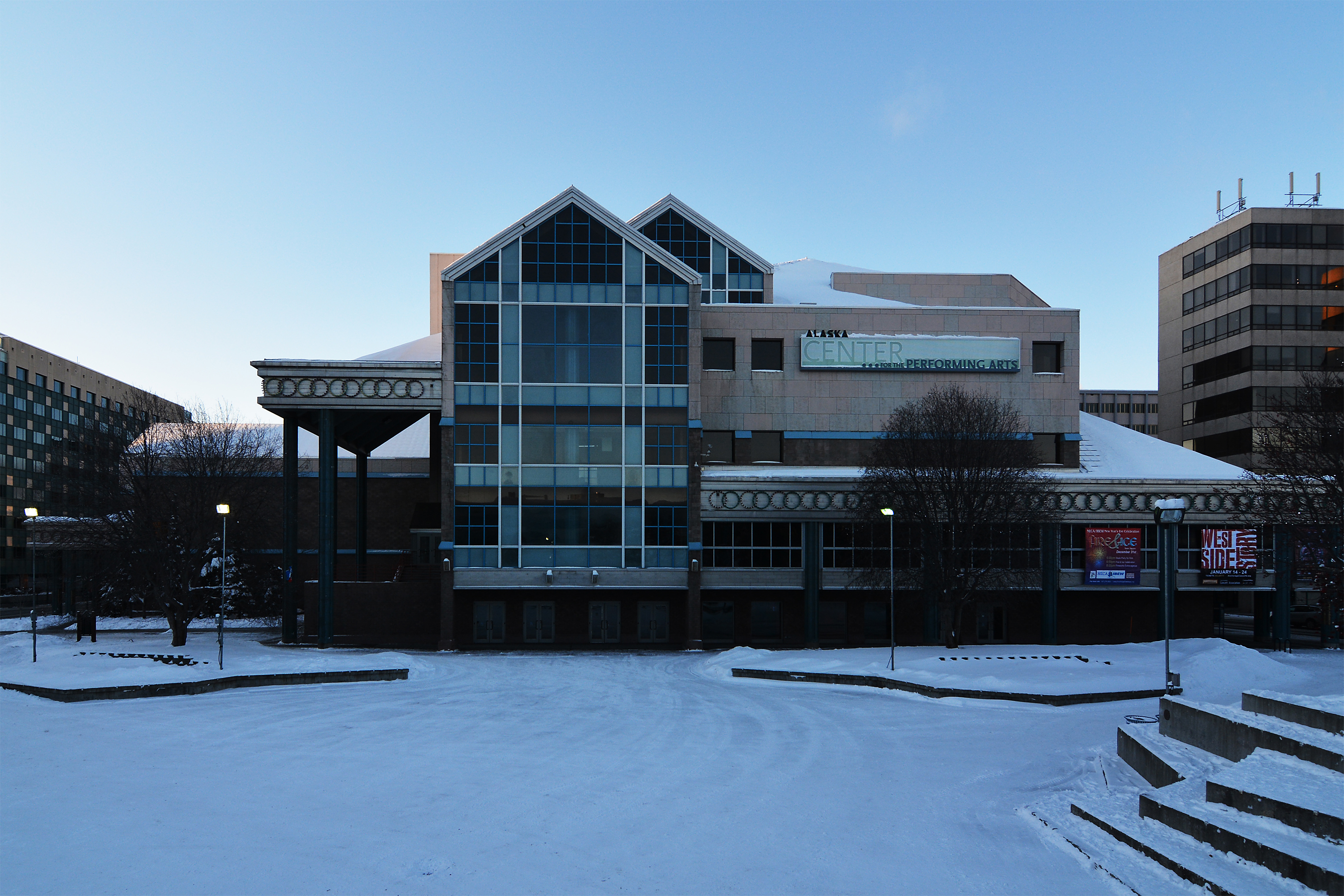
- The Alaska Center for the Performing Arts, with Town Square Park in the foreground

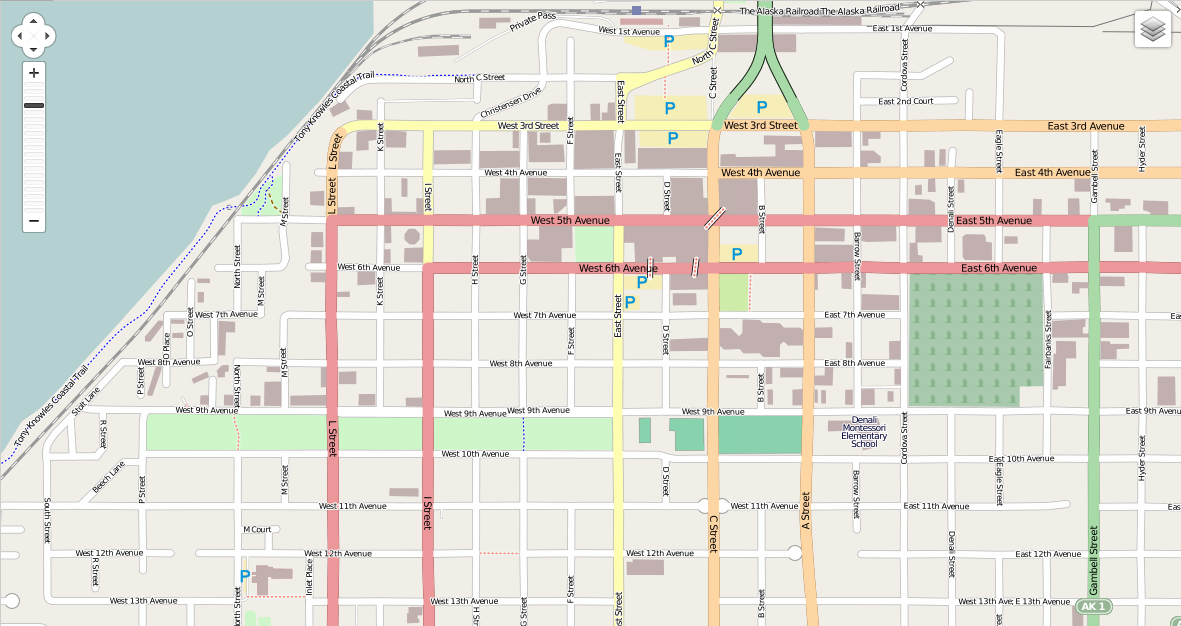
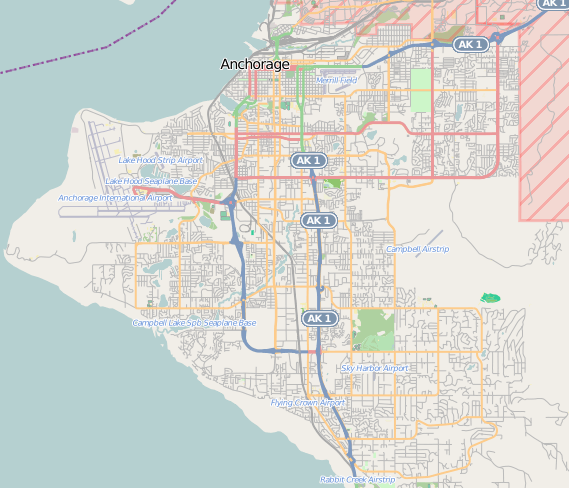
- Location within Downtown Anchorage Location within Anchorage Location within Alaska
- Address: 621 West 6th Avenue; Anchorage, Alaska
- Owner: Municipality of Anchorage
- Operator: ACPA, Inc.

Construction
- Opened: September 15, 1988
- Architect: Hardy Holzman Pfeiffer Associates

Website
- https://www.alaskapac.org

The Alaska Center for the Performing Arts is a performance venue in downtown Anchorage, Alaska. Opened in 1988, it hosts over 200,000 patrons annually, and consists of three theaters:

- Evangeline Atwood Concert Hall, with 2,000 seats, is designed for opera, symphonic, chamber and popular music presentations, as well as dance and Broadway musicals.
- Discovery Theatre, with 700 seats, is suited for theatre, smaller-scale operas, dance, film and musical presentations.
- Sydney Laurence Theatre (named for painter Sydney Laurence), with 340 seats, is suited for theatre, film and chamber music.

Resident companies include the Anchorage Symphony Orchestra, the Anchorage Opera (Alaska's only professional opera company), the Alaska Dance Theatre, the Alaska Junior Theater, the Anchorage Concert Association (Alaska's largest Arts Promoter), Perseverance Theatre and the Anchorage Concert Chorus.

== History ==
The block on which the AlaskaPAC sits was designated in the Anchorage townsite as the location of the city's public schools. When schools were built away from the townsite boundaries starting in the 1950s, largely through the creation of the Anchorage Independent School District and later the Greater Anchorage Area Borough, the existing school building on that block eventually became the City Hall annex and a community gymnasium. The Sydney Laurence Auditorium, the ACPA's direct forerunner, was also on this block. The Laurence Auditorium was perhaps best known as the site of the Prudhoe Bay oil-lease sale in 1969, conducted by Alaska's state government under then-Governor Keith Miller. Project 80s, started under Mayor George Sullivan and largely spearheaded by his successor, Tony Knowles, saw the replacement of those two buildings with the ACPA.

Building the Alaska Center for the Performing Arts was perhaps the most controversial undertaking of Knowles's six-year tenure as mayor, largely due to the doubling of the original $35 million cost estimate before construction completed. Mayor Tom Fink, Knowles' successor, threatened to defund the center over cost overruns. The design of the building was criticized for lacking a drop-off area, and for entrances on the wrong side of one-way streets. Even the proposed name of the center invited controversy as voters overturned the Anchorage Assembly's decision to name the center after Dr. Martin Luther King Jr.

== See also ==
- List of concert halls
