= Fish Creek =

Fish Creek may refer to:

== Streams ==
Canada

- Fish Creek (Alberta), in Fish Creek Provincial Park
- Fish Creek (Saskatchewan), also known as Tourond's Coulee
- Rural Municipality of Fish Creek No. 402, Saskatchewan

United States

- Fish Creek (Georgia)
- Fish Creek (Kansas)
- Fish Creek (Black River tributary), in New York
- Fish Creek (East Branch Delaware River tributary), in New York
- Fish Creek (Oneida Lake tributary), in New York
- Fish Creek (Oregon), a Recreational River within the National Wild and Scenic Rivers System

== Communities ==
Australia

- Fish Creek, Victoria

Canada

- Fish Creek No. 402, Saskatchewan

United States

- Fish Creek, Wisconsin

== Other uses ==
- Battle of Fish Creek, part of the North-West Rebellion

== See also ==
- Fishkill (disambiguation)
- List of creeks named Fish Creek
