= J. C. Penney Store (Anchorage, Alaska) =

J. C. Penney Store, Anchorage
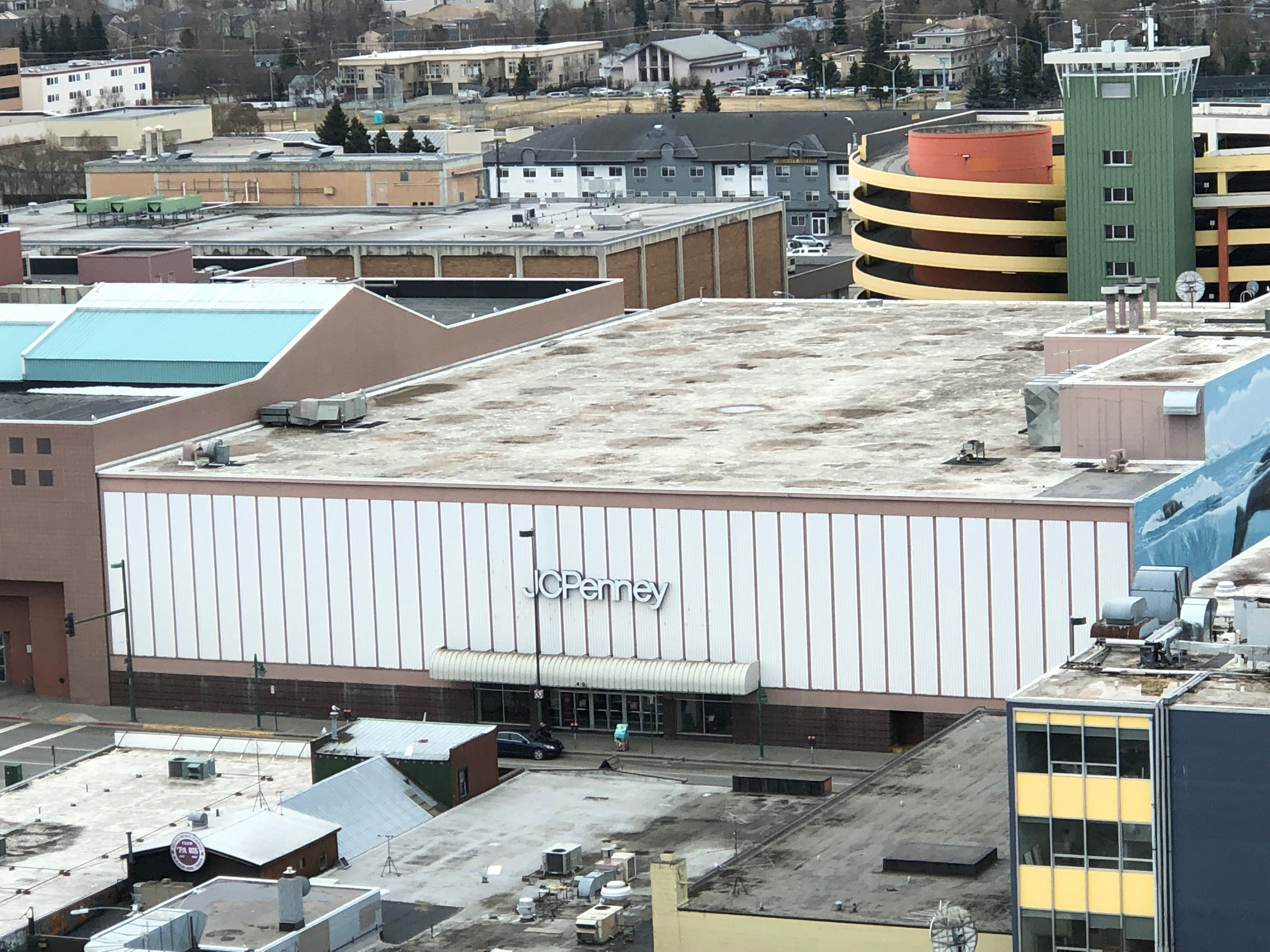
- J. C. Penney building in Anchorage
- Interactive map of the J. C. Penney Store, Anchorage area

General information
- Type: Department store
- Location: Downtown Anchorage, Alaska, US, Fifth Avenue and D Street
- Coordinates: 61°13′02″N 149°53′25″W
- Opened: 1962
- Renovated: Post-1964 (rebuilt)
- Owner: J. C. Penney

The J. C. Penney Store in Anchorage, Alaska, is a department store and part of the United States retail chain J. C. Penney. The store was established in 1962 on Fifth Avenue in downtown Anchorage, making J. C. Penney one of the first national retailers to establish a presence in the state following Alaska's admission to the union as the 49th state in 1959. The store has been housed in two buildings on the same Fifth Avenue site since it opened.

The store's original site, known locally as The Penney Building, was effectively destroyed during the 1964 Alaska earthquake. It was one of the larger buildings in Anchorage to fall due to the shaking, rather than to ensuing landslides. A larger store was rebuilt on the same location, which later included a parking garage on an adjacent block connected by a skywalk. These structures and the later Northern Commercial Company department store (which was purchased by Nordstrom several years after it was built), formed the foundation of the 5th Avenue Mall. The building currently features a Whaling Wall mural along its west wall.

== History ==
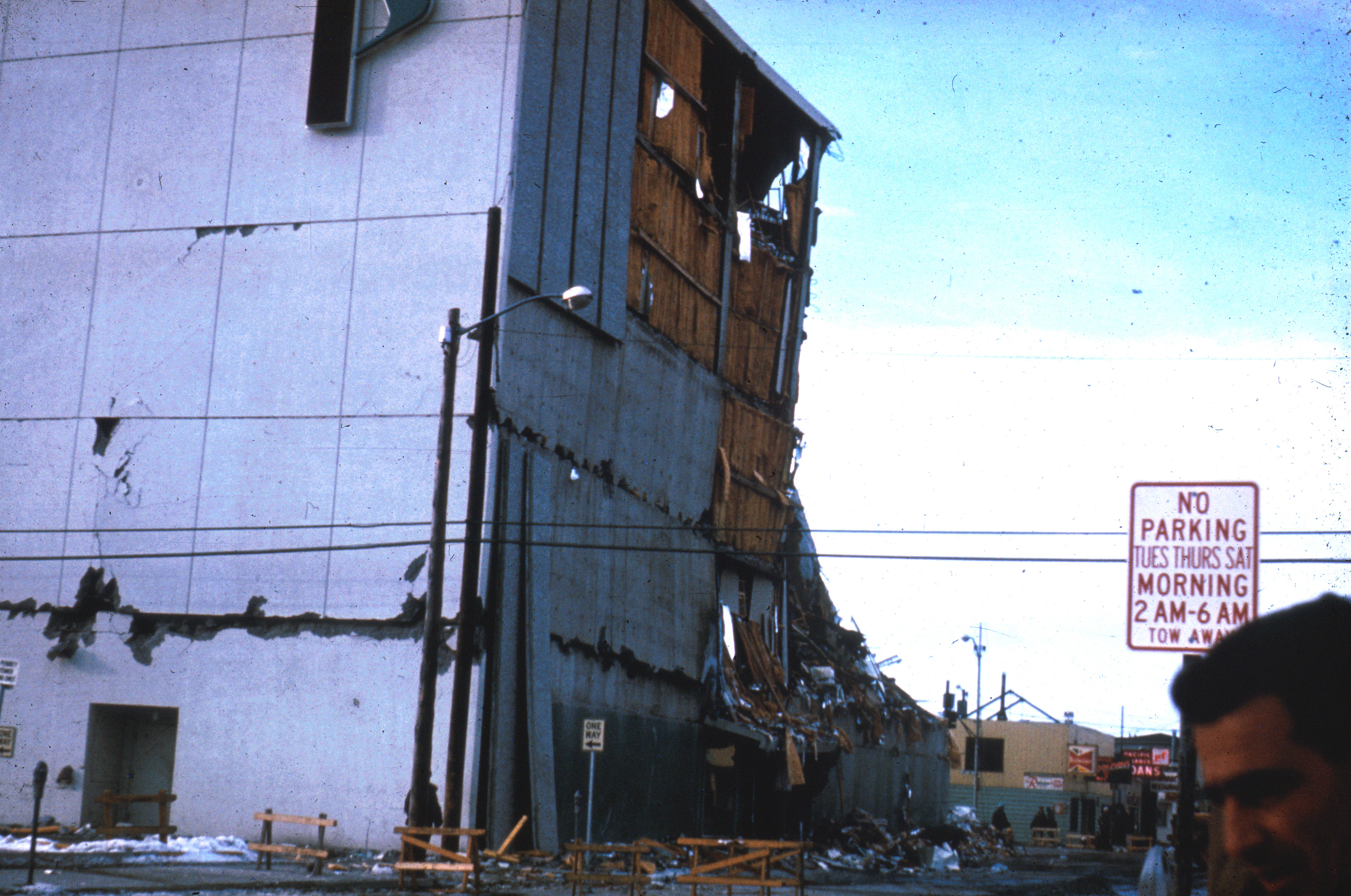
The original Penney Building in Anchorage in 1964, following the earthquake

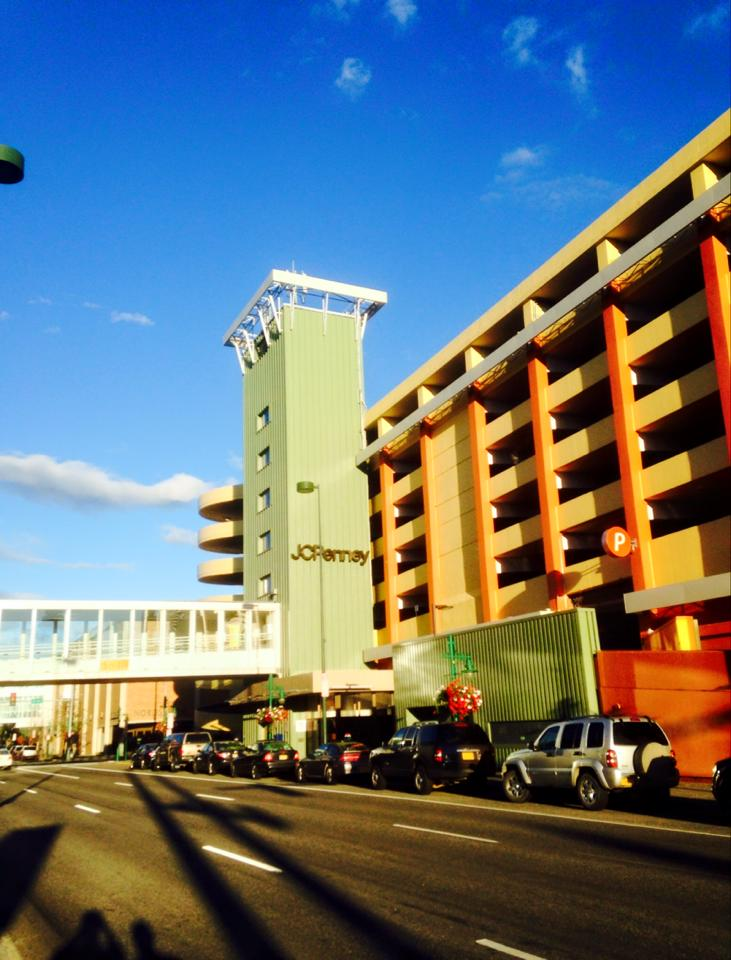
The J. C. Penney parking garage as it appeared from the corner of Sixth Avenue and E Street in August 2015

J. C. Penney built its first Alaska store in 1962, located on the southwest corner of Fifth Avenue and D Street in downtown Anchorage. The company acquired the site by executing a 55-year lease with Hoyt Motors, one of Anchorage's earliest automobile dealerships. Hoyt Motors folded upon vacating the site, part of a trend in early 1960s Anchorage of dealerships changing ownership and moving out of downtown and to the Glenn Highway and Seward Highway corridors.

The Penney Building in Anchorage was five stories tall and almost 100,000 square feet (9,300 m^{2}) in size. It partially collapsed and was damaged beyond repair during the 1964 Alaska earthquake. Precast concrete wall panels (one story tall and about as wide apiece) fell to the streets below during the shaking, which resulted in deaths as well as near-misses. The company continued to sell its wares, operating out of rented storefront space and its warehouse on East Fifth Avenue. The Penney Building was torn down to its foundation and was rebuilt as a three-story building, with the footprint slightly more than doubled to extend south to Sixth Avenue.

The loss of parking which resulted, led the company to construct Anchorage's first public parking garage, which opened in 1968. The garage is connected to the store by a second-level skywalk spanning Sixth Avenue. Over the decades, the garage's ground level, known mostly as the Penney Mall, housed a variety of retail businesses, both operated by the company and by other merchants. A People Mover "mini transit center" was located underneath the entrance ramp for many years. It was torn down when the bus stops for the Penney Mall and the federal building on Seventh Avenue were moved elsewhere. Another structure currently occupies that space.

The store, along with the front portion of the Reeve Building directly across D Street, was integrated with the design of the 5th Avenue Mall when it was built in 1987. The construction of the mall led to the vacation of that block of D Street. As a result, the store's eastern entrance was reconstructed to let out directly into the mall on multiple floors.

== Other J.C. Penney locations in Alaska ==
J. C. Penney also constructed a store in Fairbanks, which opened in 1966. It was located in Alaska's first urban renewal district. Several blocks of downtown Fairbanks, which previously consisted mostly of log cabins, including a former red-light district, were cleared, and a block of Sixth Avenue was vacated. In its place were constructed large office and commercial buildings, with the Penney store and a state office and courthouse building (the latter building currently home to the UAF Community and Technical College) the largest. Safeway and Woolworth's also built stores in this area at around the same time. The Fairbanks store, particularly its second floor, served as a refuge during another natural disaster, the 1967 flood.

The company closed this store in 1998 during a nationwide round of store closings. The building is currently owned by a local furniture retailer, Sadler's Home Furnishings.

== See also ==
- J.C. Penney
