= Ben Boeke Ice Rink =

Ice hockey arena in Anchorage, Alaska

Coordinates: 61°12′15″N 149°52′24″W

- Boeke
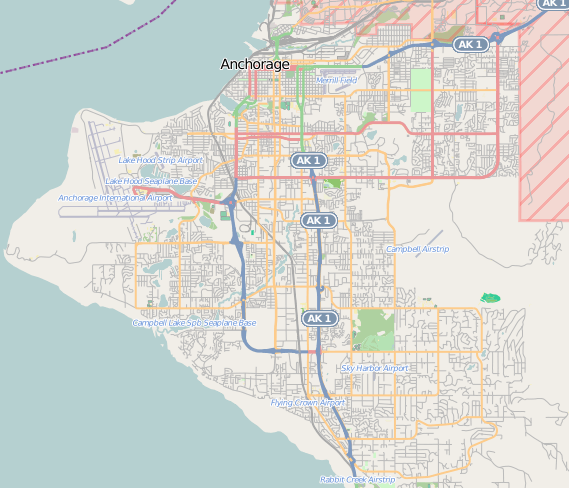
- Location within Anchorage Location within Alaska
- Location: 534 E. 16th Avenue; Anchorage, Alaska 99501
- Owner: Municipality of Anchorage
- Operator: O'Malley Ice & Sports
- Capacity: 688 and 276 standing room (Rink 1); 100 (Rink 2)
- Surface: Two 200' x 85' (ice hockey)

Construction
- Opened: October 1974, addition 1975

Tenant
- Anchorage Wolverines (NAHL) (2021-2024)

Ben Boeke Ice Rink (often shortened to “The Ben,” "Boeke" or "BB1/BB2") is an ice hockey arena in Anchorage, Alaska that opened in 1974. It is named after former Anchorage city clerk Benjamin W. Boeke, who served from 1947 to 1967, under 11 mayors and 8 city managers. The arena is owned by the Municipality of Anchorage and operated by O'Malley Ice & Sports, who operates Sullivan Arena.

In 2021, due to Sullivan Arena being used as a homeless shelter, the Anchorage Wolverines of the NAHL used it as their temporary home for 3 seasons, before moving into Sullivan Arena for 2024.

== About ==
The Ben Boeke sits in the southwest region of Fairview, a neighborhood in Anchorage. The arena contains two ice surfaces, each 200' x 85'. Rink 1 has a seating capacity of 688 and 275 standing room whereas Rink 2 is much smaller and only seats a maximum of 100 people and standing room 275. Rink 1 and Rink 2 bleachers are accommodated with hanging inferred heating.

Ben Boeke Ice Rink is located adjacent to the Sullivan Arena. The arena is occasionally used as an overflow venue for the Sullivan's larger events, such as the Great Alaska Sportsman Show. It shares parking with Mulcahy Stadium and Anchorage Football Stadium, Bonnie Cusack outdoor Ice Rinks.
