= Dimond High School =

A. J. Dimond High School

Location
- 2909 West 88th Avenue; Anchorage, Alaska 99502; United States; 61°08′35″N 149°56′05″W

Information
- Type: Public secondary
- Established: 1967 (59 years ago)
- School district: Anchorage School District
- CEEB code: 020003
- Principal: Whitney D'Atri
- Teaching staff: 62.22 (FTE)
- Grades: 9–12
- Enrollment: 1,406 (2023–2024)
- Student to teacher ratio: 22.60
- Colors: Maroon and gold
- Fight song: Dimond Fight Song
- Mascot: Lynx
- Newspaper: Igaramkin
- Yearbook: The Spectrum
- Website: www.asdk12.org/dimond

A. J. Dimond High School (DHS) is a public four-year high school in Anchorage, Alaska, and is a part of the Anchorage School District. It has been accredited by the Northwest Commission on Colleges and Universities. Dimond serves students in the Sand Lake, Kincaid, and Bayshore areas of suburban Anchorage, and had an enrollment of 1,709 as of November 25, 2016.

== History ==
=== Early years ===
Named for the territorial-era Congressional delegate and judge Anthony J. Dimond, the school opened in 1967 and was the third high school in Anchorage. Constructed in and serving the Sand Lake section of Anchorage, the original structure was built with the plans for an open campus Southern Californian-style school, though obvious complications arose due to the differences in climate. Following its construction, causeways (referred to as "breezeways") between each of the building segments were created to allow for winter access to the different sections of the school. The original Dimond High School had over 160 exits due to these causeways. The design was single story (with the exception of the library) to reduce earthquake risk, as the construction occurred only a few years after the 1964 Alaska earthquake in which most of the second floor of West Anchorage High School was destroyed.

The original school contained gymnasiums, a pellet gun range, a planetarium, a small and large theater, and a shared library. The original building housed both Dimond High and Jane Mears Junior High School. Mears, the sister of Jonathan Mayhew Wainwright IV, was a teacher in the early years of Anchorage's public school system. Her husband, Colonel Frederick Mears, headed the Alaska Engineering Commission during the construction of the Alaska Railroad and was the railroad's first general manager once it began operating. During a period of heightened governmental expenditures in the 1980s which led to the construction of numerous public facilities in Anchorage, a separate building for Mears was constructed on the opposite side of Campbell Lake, which opened in the fall of 1985. Prior to the completion of the separate junior high, the two schools shared the hours of operation. Mears students attended classes on the west side of the campus, with Dimond students attending school on the east side.

=== New building ===
In April 1999, Anchorage voters approved the construction of a new building for Dimond High School. The new building opened in the fall of 2003. During the 2003-2004 school year Dimond classes were held in the new building and a small west wing ("Casa Cinco", due to being a fifth wing to the new school and housing a large number of the foreign language classes) of the old building, with the rest of the building used for Mears Middle School. In the summer of 2004 the old building was demolished and in the location of the old Dimond High school is now the parking lot of the new building. However, the building that housed the gym, weight room, and swimming pool was not demolished and remains a part of the school. In the summer of 2008, its exterior was remodeled.

On November 30, 2018, the campus was damaged during the 7.0 earthquake that occurred that day. Ceiling tiles and other fallen debris covered the floor throughout the school. There were no injuries on the school grounds.

== Athletics ==
4A division high school sports are offered at Dimond High School: baseball (boys'), basketball, bowling, cheerleading (basketball, hockey, and football), competitive cheer, cross country running, cross country skiing, football (boys'), flag football (girls'), gymnastics (boys'), ice hockey, riflery, soccer, softball (girls'), swimming & diving, tennis, track & field, volleyball (girls'), and wrestling. Dimond also has a Debate/Drama/Forensics team, World Language Declamation Contest participants, and American Legion Oratorical Contest participants. In 2009, Dimond was named the top athletic program in the state of Alaska by Sports Illustrated after winning that year state championships in girls' volleyball, boys' basketball, competitive cheerleading, girls' track & field, and baseball. Since then, for a total of three consecutive years, the Dimond volleyball team has won the state championship twice more, each year producing a State winner for the Gatorade Player of the Year award. In 2006, the alumni foundation got 750-thousand dollars from the Alaska Legislature and 250 thousand dollars from the Anchorage School District to put in an artificial football field. Construction was halted in July 2007 after Governor Sarah Palin vetoed the final half million dollars in funding to finish the project. On July 6, 2007, the alumni foundation secured anonymous donor funding of $500,000 to finish it. 30,000 Nike shoes were recycled to create the rubber for the turf.

== Demographics ==
Ethnicity	Percentage (%)
White	48.4
Black	4.3
Hispanic	9.6
Asian/Pacific Islander	15.2
American Indian/Alaska Native	8.7
Two or more races	13.8

== Notable alumni ==
- Irene Bedard - actress (Pocahontas)
- Blair Chenoweth - Miss Alaska (2003), Miss Alaska USA (2007)
- Jason Grenn - member of the Alaska House of Representatives
- Barrett Heisten - professional ice hockey player
- Vic Kohring - former member of the Alaska House of Representatives from Wasilla, key figure in the Alaska political corruption probe
- Chris Kuper - professional football player with the Denver Broncos
- Brock Lindow - lead singer of 36 Crazyfists
- Lesil McGuire - member of the Alaska Senate from Anchorage; her district includes the school
- Charisse Millett - member of the Alaska House of Representatives from Anchorage
- Jim O'Rear - professional actor, stunt-man, screenwriter
- Alissa Pili - professional basketball player with the Minnesota Lynx
