= List of neighborhoods of Anchorage, Alaska =

The following is a list of neighborhoods in the Municipality of Anchorage, Alaska, United States. The "Anchorage Bowl" is the area normally thought of simply as Anchorage. Other areas within the Municipality are located along the Glenn and Seward highways running north and south from Anchorage respectively. These are separate communities, some of which were previously separate municipalities before merging into the unified Anchorage municipal government in 1975. Some communities are up to 50 miles (80 km) from downtown Anchorage.

- Anchorage Bowl
  - Abbott Loop
  - Airport Heights
  - Bayshore
  - Bear Valley
  - Boniface
  - Bragaw
  - Campbell Park
  - Dimond
  - Downtown Anchorage
  - Fairview
  - Glen Alps
  - Government Hill
  - Green Acres
  - Hillside
  - Lake Otis
  - Little Fairbanks
  - Midtown
  - Mountain View
  - Muldoon
  - North Star
  - Nunaka Valley
  - Oceanview
  - O' Malley
  - Rabbit Creek
  - Rogers Park
  - Russian Jack
  - Sand Lake
  - South Addition
  - Spenard
  - Stuckagain Heights
  - Tudor
  - Turnagain
  - University-Medical District
- North of central Anchorage
  - Birchwood
  - Chugiak
  - Eagle River
  - Eklutna
  - Peters Creek
- South of central Anchorage
  - Bird
  - Girdwood
  - Indian
  - Portage
  - Rainbow
