= Dead fish (disambiguation) =

Dead fish most often refers to fish kill.

Dead fish may also refer to:

- Dead Fish, a 2004 German film
- Dead Fish (band), a Brazilian hardcore band

== See also ==
- Fish as food
- Fishkill (disambiguation)
