= Fairview Elementary School =

Fairview Elementary School can refer to:

- Fairview Elementary School in Fairview, Anchorage
- Fairview Elementary School in Fairview, Utah
- Fairview Elementary School, part of the Hayward Unified School District in Hayward, California
- Fairview Elementary School, part of Adams County School District 50 in Denver, Colorado
- Fairview Elementary School in Middletown Township, New Jersey
- Fairview Elementary School in Fairfax Station, Virginia
- Fairview Elementary School, formerly part of Darien School District 61 in Darien, Illinois
- Fairview Elementary School in Mississauga, Ontario
- Fairview South Elementary School in Skokie, Illinois
