= Government Hill, Anchorage =

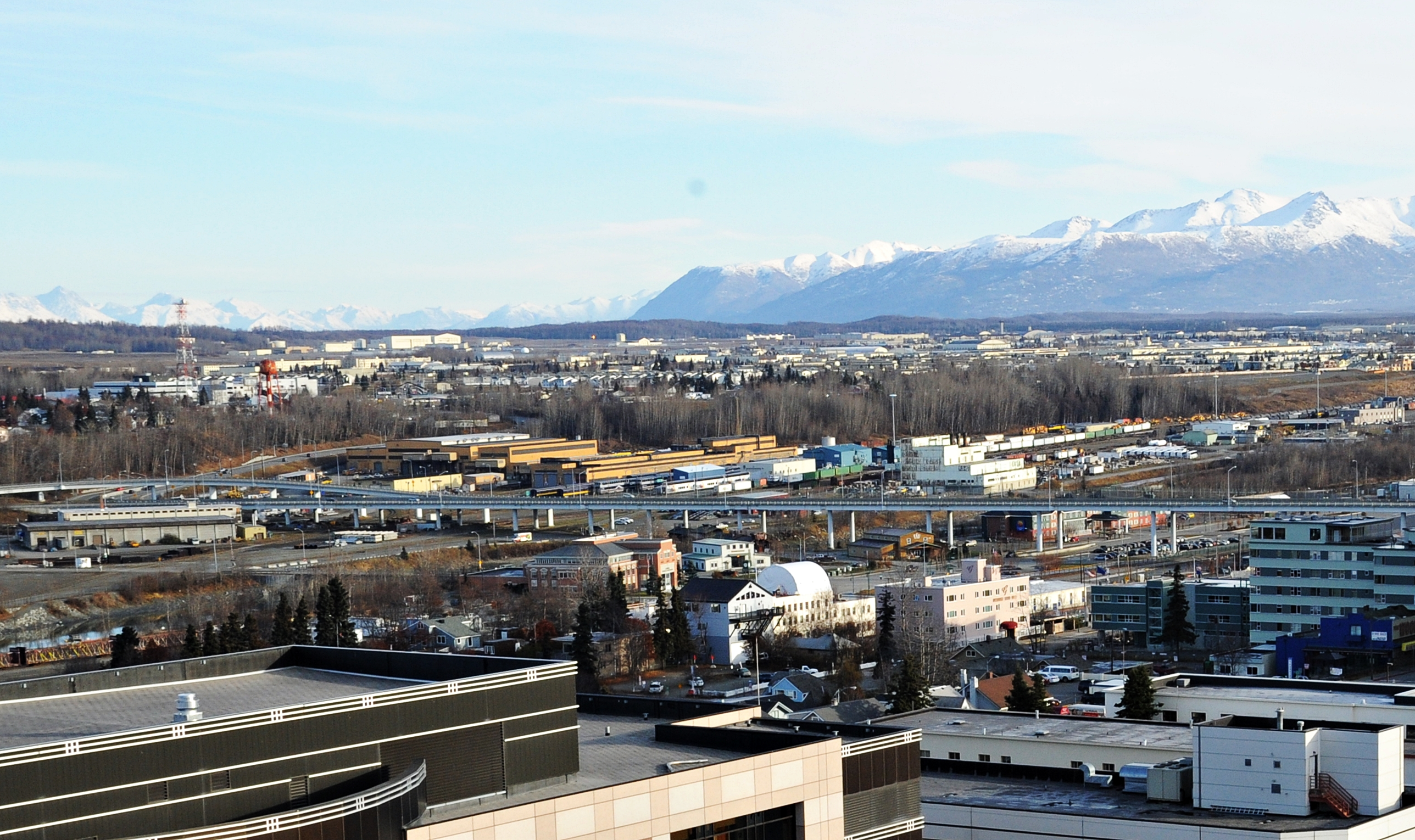
Government Hill runs across the midground in this view looking northeast from the Hotel Captain Cook in downtown Anchorage. Only the water tower, AT&T Alascom headquarters and Hollywood Vista site can be plainly seen, with tall trees along the bluff obscuring the rest of the view.

Government Hill is a neighborhood in the northwest part of Anchorage, Alaska, United States, sitting in between Anchorage's downtown area and the western reaches of Joint Base Elmendorf-Richardson, specifically the portion formerly known as Elmendorf Air Force Base. The neighborhood is named for the "hill" it sits on of about 115 feet (35 m) bearing the same name, which is actually a bluff which rises alongside the northern banks of Ship Creek. The origins of the name date to 1915, when a federal land reserve was created in the area for the Alaska Engineering Commission, then heavily involved in constructing the Alaska Railroad nearby.

The neighborhood sits alongside Knik Arm in north Anchorage. It is very ethnically diverse. Numerous Korean emigrants to Anchorage over the years have made Government Hill their first home in the city. Many residents work either in downtown Anchorage or at JBER, which flank the neighborhood to the south and north, respectively. Both are within walking distance.

== History ==
=== Early 20th century ===
- Government Hill Federal Housing Historic District
- U.S. National Register of Historic Places
- U.S. Historic district
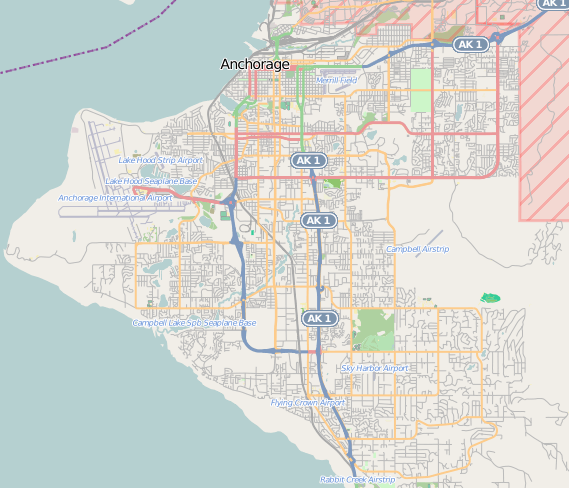
- Location within Anchorage Location within Alaska
- Location: Anchorage, Alaska
- Coordinates: 61°13′43″N 149°53′11″W
- NRHP reference No.: 14001147
- Added to NRHP: January 14, 2015

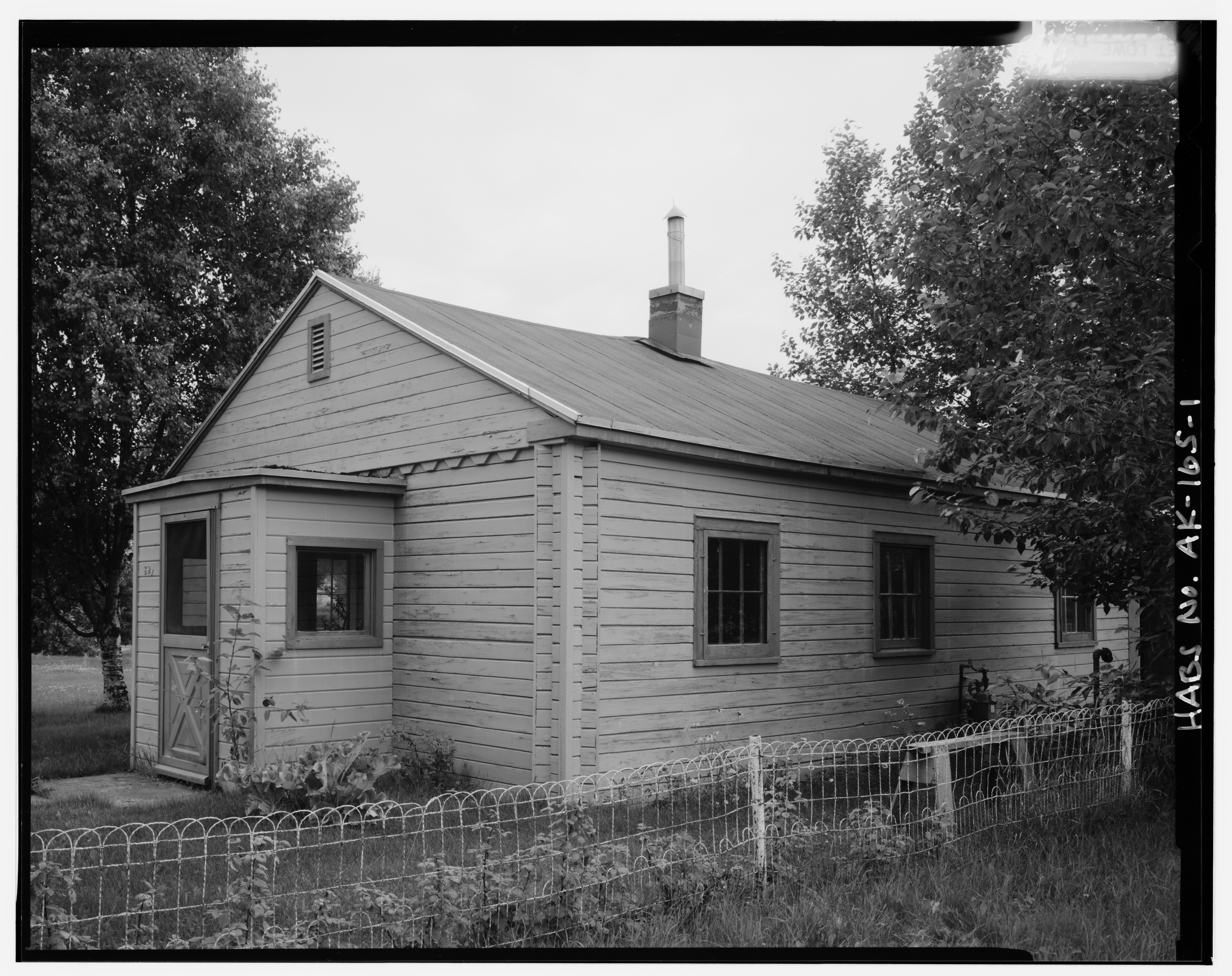
Loxtave house at 821 Brown Street. The house was moved or demolished ca. 2002 to make way for a new house on that lot.

Government Hill is often called Anchorage's oldest and first neighborhood. The U.S. government withdrew the area from inclusion as part of the Anchorage townsite, and instead created a reserve for housing workers from the railroad and other federal entities doing work in the area. The AEC constructed 13 houses in the southwest corner of the area in 1915. This area was listed as Government Hill Federal Housing Historic District on the National Register of Historic Places in 2015.

Loop Road had appeared by the 1920s, which connected Anchorage with the extensive farms by then operating north and northeast of the town. Robert Atwood, describing his early years in Anchorage in his autobiography, referred to Loop Road as the only interesting drive to be had in the area. The farms would be acquired by the federal government in the late 1930s to create Elmendorf as well as Fort Richardson.

The Alaska Railroad subdivided the remainder of the reserve not taken by the military in 1945 and 1946. Scores of World War II-era surplus and prefabricated buildings, such as Quonset huts, Loxtave houses (developed by the U.S. Navy) and Harman houses (developed by a short-lived Philadelphia-based company), were moved onto the lots. A small number of these original structures still exist in the neighborhood today, virtually all of them west of Loop Road.

Several of the streets built in these subdivisions were later named for Alaska Railroad officials of that era: Colwell Street for George Walter Colwell, chief engineer, Cunningham Street for John Todd Cunningham, superintendent of transportation, and Delaney Street for James J. Delaney, assistant general manager.

=== Latter 20th century and beyond ===
A substantial shopping area appeared near the intersection of Loop and Bluff Roads, directly next to the gate of Elmendorf, starting in the 1950s. National Bank of Alaska had a branch in the largest shopping mall for a number of years. One of the first bowling alleys in Anchorage, Anchorbowl, opened in 1953. In terms of competitive viability, this area had fallen on hard times by the 1980s, mostly on account of the shifting retail landscape of the time, as well as the expansion of the Carrs Quality Centers grocery chain into the expanding outlying areas of the Anchorage bowl. Remaining and subsequent businesses were geared mostly to a military clientele.

==== Earthquake damage ====
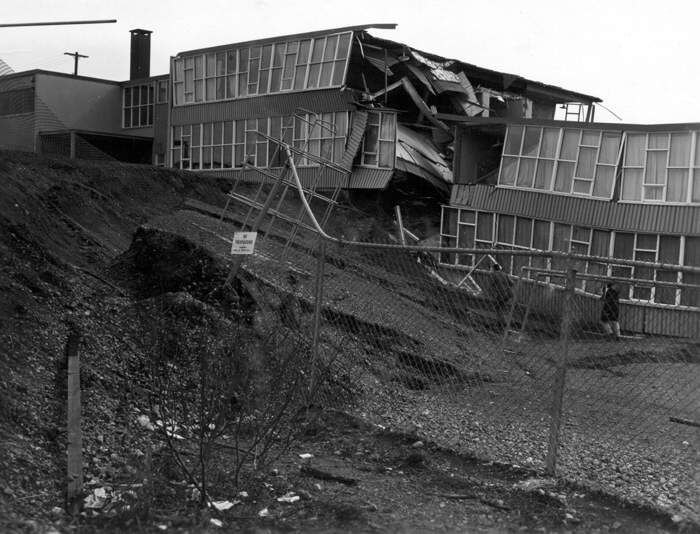
Government Hill Elementary School, following the earthquake.

Government Hill, along with portions of downtown Anchorage and the Turnagain-By-The-Sea subdivision southwest of downtown, were among the hardest hit in the earthquake of March 27, 1964. A landslide along the bluff immediately east of Loop Road, estimated as covering over 10 acres (4.0 ha), resulted in the destruction of Government Hill Elementary School, two residences atop the bluff, and a railroad building at the bottom. The west wing of the school was sheared in two. Due to continuing instability of the land underneath, the building was left as it was and the site fenced off, until the site was redeveloped as a neighborhood park in 1985.

== Infrastructure ==
=== Education ===
Government Hill Elementary was rebuilt in 1965 on military lands next to Alaska Communications System (current AT&T Alascom) headquarters, a short distance north of the original school building. The school had 479 students during the 2005-2006 school year. The school has been noted for its bilingual teaching methods using both Spanish and English.

=== Recreation ===
Government Hill is the location of the Anchorage Curling Club, which has made the neighborhood its home since 1962. The club is in an old railroad warehouse and features two sheets of ice.

=== Transportation ===
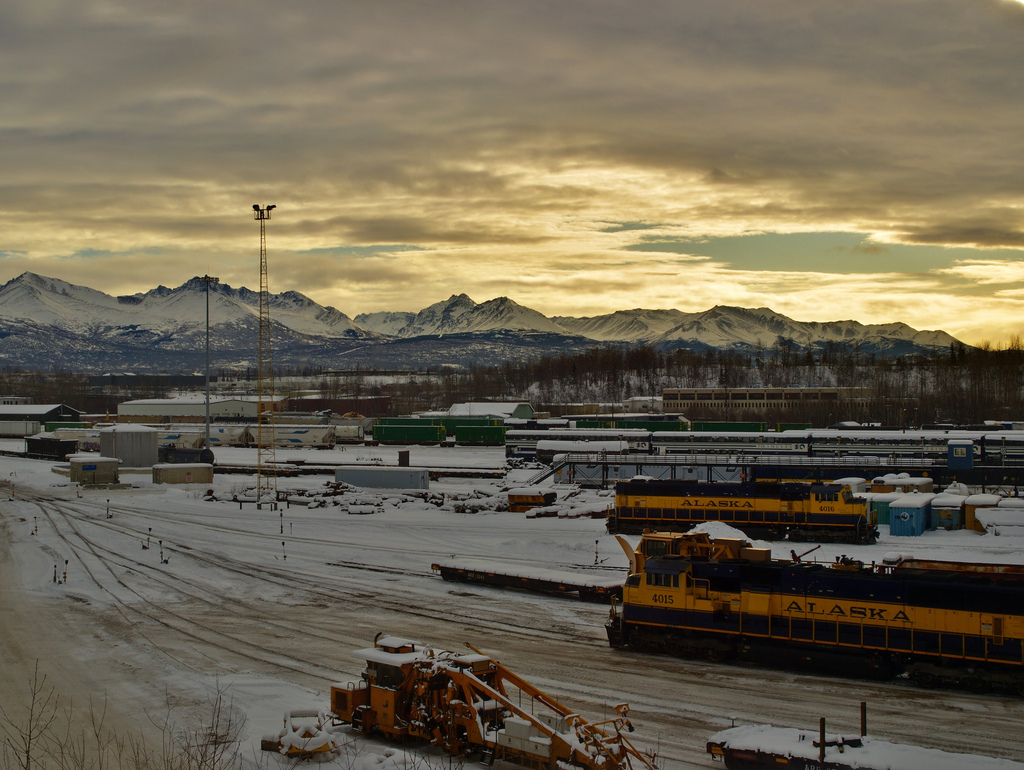
The Alaska Railroad yards as viewed from Government Hill.

At times considered part of the neighborhood is the Port of Anchorage immediately to the west, which transfers about 15 million tons of fuel a year. Portions of the Alaska Railroad yards to the south are also considered to be part of the neighborhood. A bridge was built ca. 1975 over the Ship Creek valley and railroad yards, which directly links downtown Anchorage with Government Hill and the Port. Loop Road was widened and an interchange was built at the bridge's northern end. The area around this interchange has seen numerous serious accidents in the years since.

Government Hill also plays a huge role in the Knik Arm Bridge debate. The plan proposes to build a highway and bridge across the Knik Arm from northern Anchorage and along the Susitna River drainage to connect to the Parks Highway, bypassing the densely populated central portions of the Matanuska-Susitna Borough, particularly Wasilla. Many Government Hill residents oppose the plan, since many of the options presented would bisect the neighborhood.

Government Hill is served by the #41 People Mover route, linking it to Downtown and Fairview.

=== Other ===
Also considered to be part of Government Hill, though not part of the original subdivisions, were 51 apartment buildings which were originally part of Elmendorf's main housing area. Though the names have changed slightly over the years, these buildings were generally known as the Richardson Vista, Panoramic View and Hollywood Vista apartment complexes. A fire station (no longer used as such, deemed unnecessary when the downtown fire station was relocated to provide direct access to the bridge) marked the demarcation point between the apartments and the mostly single-family remainder of Government Hill.

Hollywood Vista was condemned in 1989, after falling into stages of neglect and disrepair for over a decade under various owners. The buildings were razed in 1997. The Municipality of Anchorage currently owns the land, and has faced periodic political battles over the years over how to redevelop the site.

== See also ==
- National Register of Historic Places listings in Anchorage, Alaska
- Neighborhoods of Anchorage, Alaska
