= Chris Kuper =

American football player and coach (born 1982)

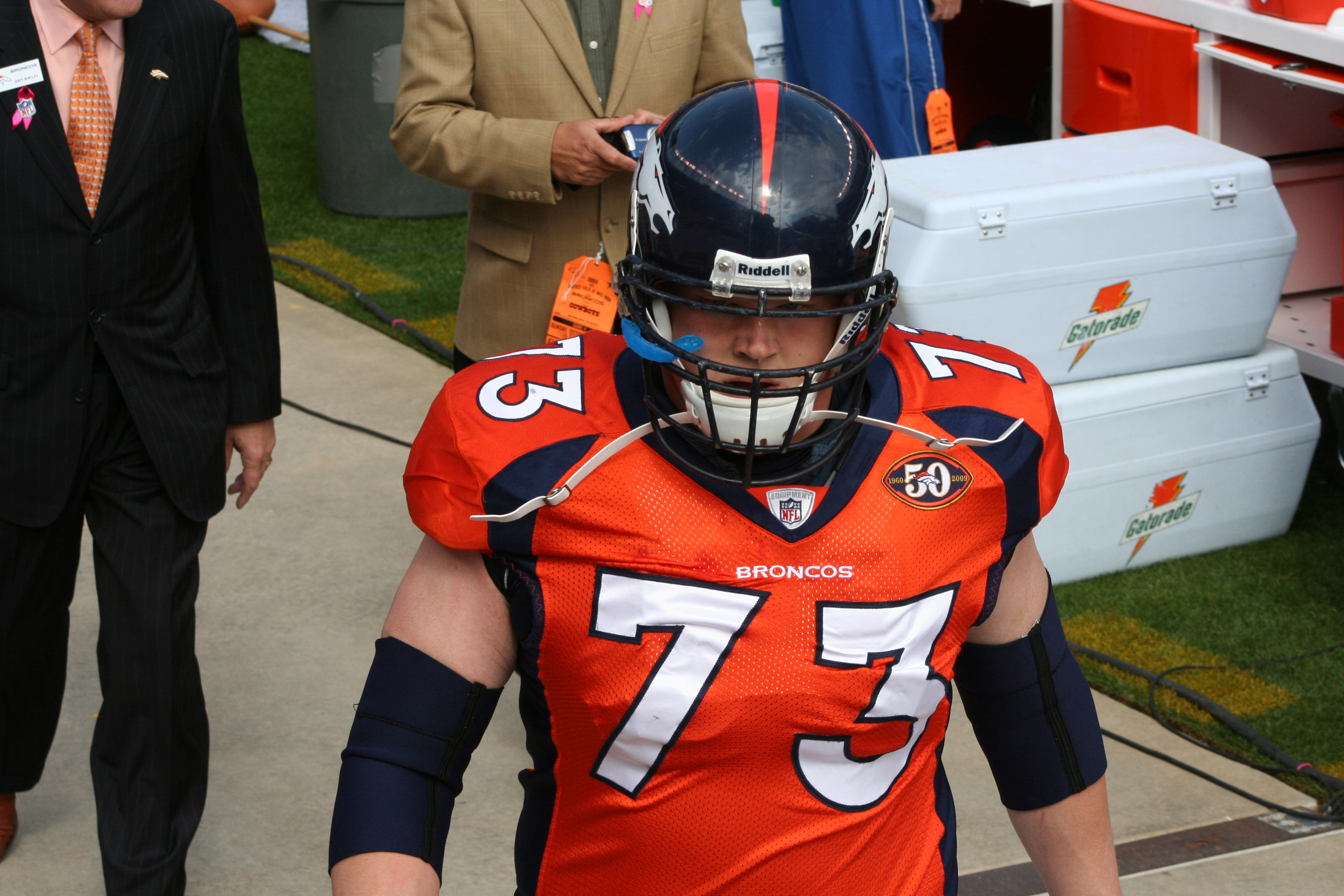
- Kuper with the Denver Broncos in 2009

Philadelphia Eagles
- Title: Offensive line coach

Personal information
- Born: December 19, 1982 (age 43); Anchorage, Alaska, U.S.
- Listed height: 6 ft 4 in (1.93 m)
- Listed weight: 303 lb (137 kg)

Career information
- Position: Guard (No. 73)
- High school: Dimond (Anchorage)
- College: North Dakota
- NFL draft: 2006: 5th round, 161st overall pick

Career history

Playing
- Denver Broncos (2006–2013)

Coaching
- Columbine High School (2015) Offensive line coach; Miami Dolphins (2016) Offensive quality control coach; Miami Dolphins (2017–2018) Assistant offensive line coach; Denver Broncos (2019–2021) Assistant offensive line coach; Minnesota Vikings (2022–2025) Offensive line coach; Philadelphia Eagles (2026–present) Offensive line coach

Career NFL statistics
- Games played: 90
- Games started: 79
- Fumble recoveries: 1
- Stats at Pro Football Reference

Chris Kuper (born December 19, 1982) is an American former professional football player and offensive line coach for the Philadelphia Eagles of the National Football League (NFL). He played college football for the North Dakota Fighting Hawks and was selected by the Denver Broncos in the fifth round of the 2006 NFL draft. Kuper was the offensive line coach for the Minnesota Vikings from 2022 to 2026.

== Early life ==
Kuper played high school football at A. J. Dimond High School in Anchorage, Alaska where he helped the Lynx win the 2001 ASAA Large Schools State Championship.

As a senior, Kuper finished just behind Matt Gittlein of Wasilla High School as the state's Lineman of the Year.

== College career ==
He played college football for the North Dakota Fighting Sioux. He was a three-year starter, awarded all-conference and All American honors since his junior campaign.

== Professional career ==
Pre-draft measurables
Height	Weight	Arm length	Hand span	40-yard dash	10-yard split	20-yard split	20-yard shuttle	Three-cone drill	Vertical jump	Broad jump	Bench press
6 ft 4 3/8 in (1.94 m)	301 lb (137 kg)	32 3/4 in (0.83 m)	9 1/4 in (0.23 m)	5.10 s	1.79 s	2.93 s	4.60 s	7.59 s	30.0 in (0.76 m)	9 ft 1 in (2.77 m)	24 reps
All values from NFL Combine/Pro Day

Projected to go undrafted by Sports Illustrated, who criticized his lack of "balance, body control and ability in space," Kuper was ranked as the No. 28 offensive guard available in the 2006 NFL draft. Kuper was eventually selected in the fifth round, 161st overall, by the Denver Broncos. He was the highest selected North Dakota lineman since Todd Thomas in 1981.

Kuper started 79-of-90 games played (68 at right guard) while playing his entire eight-year NFL career with the Broncos.

On June 4, 2010, the Broncos announced that they had signed Kuper to a five-year deal worth $25.5 million. The new contract made him the second-highest-paid offensive lineman in Broncos' history, second only to former left tackle Matt Lepsis.

In 2010, the Denver Broncos announced that Kuper had been selected as co-captain of the Broncos offense, along with Kyle Orton and Daniel Graham.

During the regular season finale in 2011 against the Kansas City Chiefs, Kuper suffered a gruesome broken ankle that ended his season. That season Kuper made the Pro Bowl, but withdrew due to the injury and needed surgery.

A three-time captain, Kuper was recipient of the Ed Block Courage Award in 2012 as voted on by his teammates.

Kuper retired on March 11, 2014.

== Coaching career ==
During the 2015 high school football season, Kuper was an offensive line coach at Columbine High School in Littleton, Colorado.

On January 23, 2016, Kuper was hired by Miami Dolphins as offensive quality control coach. He then spent two seasons (2017–18) as the assistant offensive line coach for Miami.

On January 22, 2019, the Denver Broncos hired Kuper as their assistant offensive line coach.

With the firing of Vic Fangio from the Broncos, Kuper was hired by Kevin O'Connell to be the offensive line coach for the Minnesota Vikings. Before the 2026 season, his contract expired and the Vikings chose not to retain him.

On February 9, 2026, the Philadelphia Eagles hired Kuper as their new offensive line coach. Eagles offensive coordinator Sean Mannion previously played for the Minnesota Vikings at the end of his playing career, during which Kuper served as the Vikings offensive line coach.
