= People Mover (Anchorage) =

Public transit agency in Anchorage, Alaska, United States

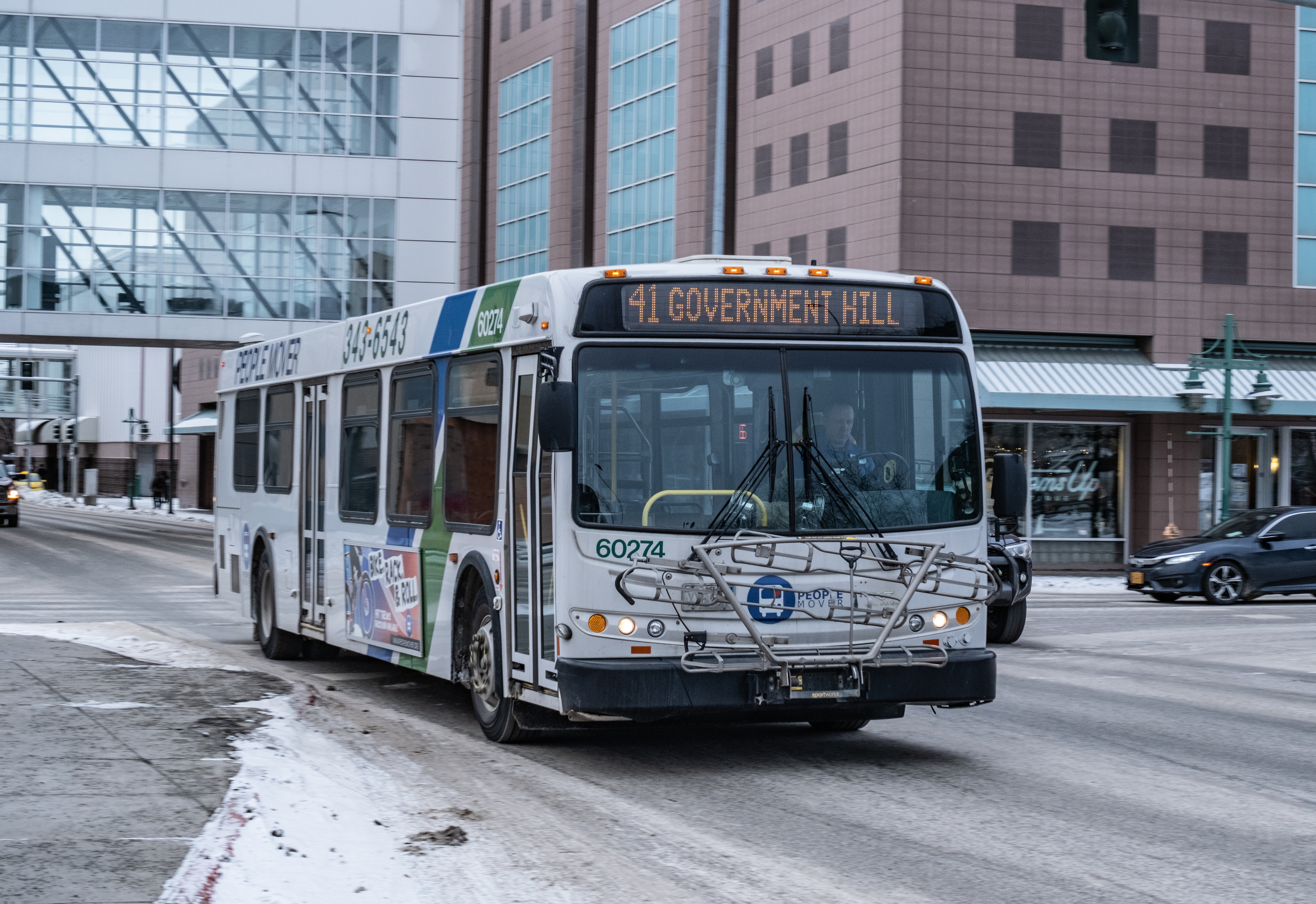
- People Mover bus in downtown Anchorage
- Founded: July 1, 1974
- Headquarters: 3600 Dr. Martin Luther King Jr. Avenue, Anchorage, AK 99507 (operations), 700 West Sixth Avenue, Anchorage, AK 99501 (customer service)
- Locale: Anchorage, Alaska
- Service area: Anchorage
- Service type: bus service
- Routes: 15
- Hubs: Dimond Center, Downtown, Eagle River, Muldoon, Providence Hospital
- Fuel type: Diesel, Electric
- Operator: Municipality of Anchorage
- Website: www.peoplemover.org

The People Mover is the public transportation agency that serves metropolitan Anchorage, Alaska, United States. It is owned and operated by the Municipality of Anchorage, with service primarily within city limits as well as Eagle River.

== Service ==
The People Mover bus system includes regular all-day service routes on many of the city's major streets as well as one route with rush hour-only service (the #92 which runs nonstop from Downtown to Eagle River). Many routes terminate at the Downtown Transit Center, located at the southeast corner of 6th Avenue and H Street in Downtown Anchorage.

People Mover service for most routes within Anchorage begins at 6 or 7 am and ends at 9 or 10 pm, with some of the major routes running until 11 pm on weekdays (and the Route 40 to the airport and Spenard running until almost 2am on weekdays). On Saturdays, most of the all-day routes begin service at 8 am, and end at 7pm. On Sundays, routes end approximately 1 hour earlier.

In 2016, the City of Anchorage undertook a study to redesign the service with the aim of providing more frequent service without increasing its public transit budget. This resulted in a proposed plan by late November 2016 for more streamlined routes, with less off-tracking than previously, combined with 15-minute frequencies in the densest parts of the city; service to outlying communities would be curtailed. It was expected that a new schedule could be introduced as early as August 2017, but it actually ended up being implemented on October 23, 2017. The previous system was designed in 2002, and most routes came once per hour.

== Current Routes ==
As of May 13th, 2024:

=== Core Routes (every 15 minutes during peak hours) ===
- 10: Downtown Transit Center - Muldoon Transit Hub via Northern Lights Boulevard.
- 20: Downtown Transit Center - ANMC Via Mountain View.
- 30: Downtown Transit Center - Muldoon Transit Hub via 15th Street and Debarr Road.
- 40: Downtown Transit Center - Ted Stevens International Airport via Spenard Road.
- 25: Downtown Transit Center - VA Clinic Via C Street, Tudor Road, and Muldoon Road.

=== Other Routes (every 30 minutes during peak hours) ===
- 35: Downtown Transit Center - Dimond Center via Arctic Boulevard.
- 55: ANMC - Dimond Center via Lake Otis Parkway.
- 65: Ted Stevens International Airport - Dimond Center via Jewel Lake Road.
- 85: Downtown Transit Center - Huffman Business Park via Old Seward Highway. (60 minutes during P.M. peak hours)

=== Neighborhood Routes (every 30 minutes during peak hours) ===
- 11: Downtown Transit Center - Fairview - Senior Center loop. (60 minutes during peak hours)
- 31: Muldoon Transit Hub - Mountain View - Russian Jack loop.
- 41: Downtown Transit Center - Government Hill loop.
- 51: Muldoon Transit Hub - Centennial Village via Muldoon Road.

=== Commuter Routes ===
- 92: Downtown Transit Center - Eagle River Transit Center via Glenn Highway.

== Transit fleet ==
=== Active Fleet ===
Fleet Number(s)	Model Year	Manufacturer	Model	Engine	Transmission
60251-60268	2008	New Flyer	D40LF	Cummins ISL	Allison B400R
60269-60283	2010	New Flyer	D40LFR	Cummins ISL9	Allison B400R
60284-60291	2011	New Flyer	D40LFR	Cummins ISL9	Allison B400R
60292-60302	2013	New Flyer	D40LFR	Cummins ISL9	Allison B400R
60303-60313	2022	New Flyer	XD40	Cummins L9	Voith D864.6
60314-60328	2024	New Flyer	XD40	Cummins L9	Voith D867.8 NXT
60329-60339	2025	New Flyer	XD40	Cummins L9	Voith D867.8 NXT
