= Anchorage 5th Avenue Mall =

Mall in Anchorage, Alaska

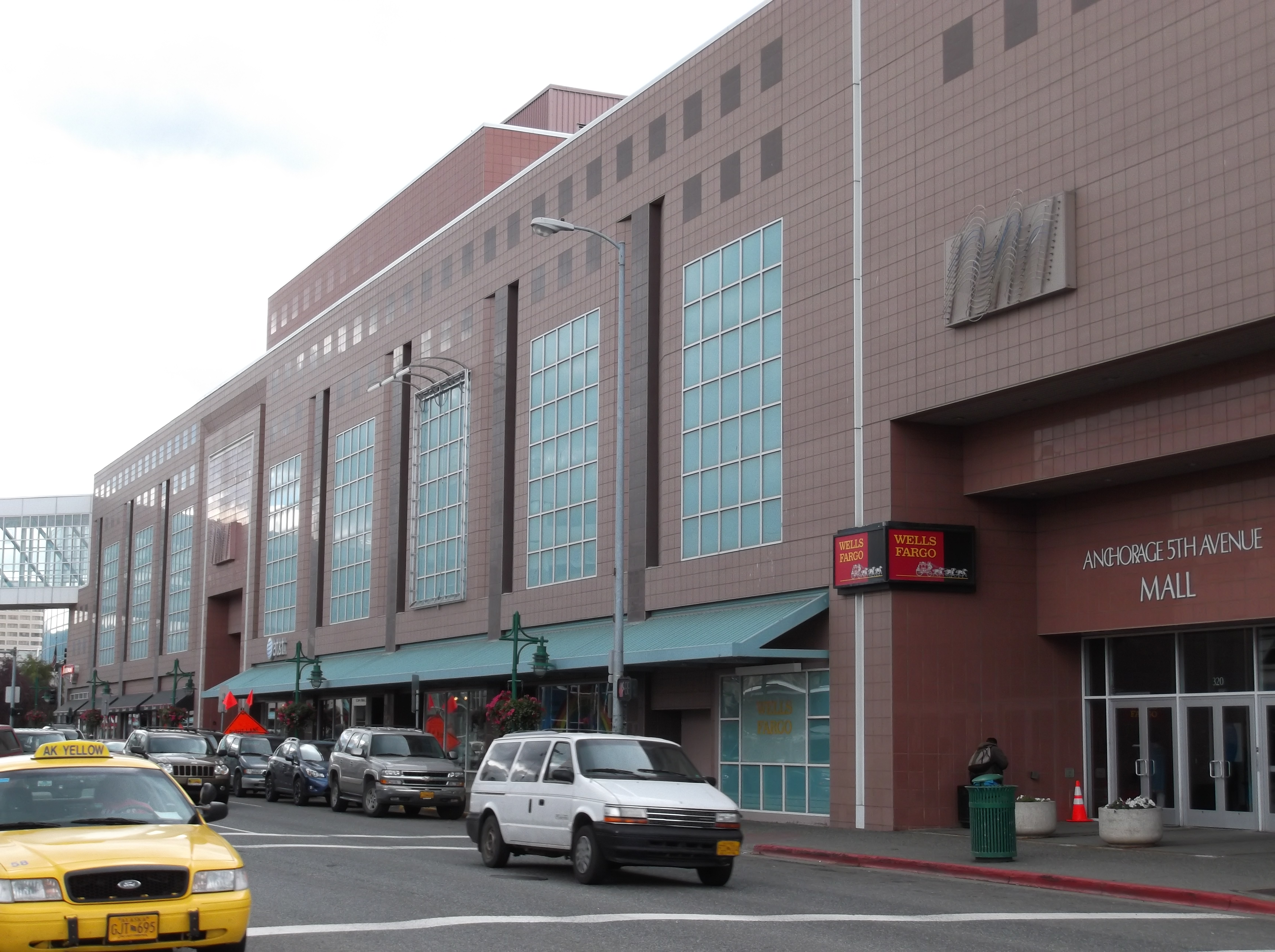
- Entrance from the intersection of 5th Avenue and D Street
- Location: Anchorage, Alaska, United States
- Coordinates: 61°13′02″N 149°53′19″W
- Address: 320 West 5th Avenue
- Opened: August 1, 1987; 39 years ago
- Owner: Simon Property Group
- Num. of stores: 60
- Num. of anchor tenants: 2 (1 open, 1 coming soon)
- Floor area: 447,000 square feet (41,500 m^{2})
- Floors: 5
- Website: simon.com

Anchorage 5th Avenue Mall is a 447,000 square feet (41,500 m^{2}) regional shopping mall located in Downtown Anchorage, Alaska, United States. It has five levels with the only JCPenney store in Alaska as its sole anchor. It also has Alaska's only Victoria's Secret, Apple Store, Coach, and Michael Kors locations. Nordstrom served as a second anchor until it closed in September 2019. The former anchor space is currently being developed into apartments and more retail.

The mall is owned by Northwestern Simon Inc. and is administered by the Simon Property Group.

== History ==
The mall opened in 1987, covering a city block previously occupied mostly by small, two-story commercial buildings and parking lots. It was developed by JCPenney and The Rainier Fund. The Nordstrom was built in 1975 and connected to the mall by a skybridge. The mall's occupancy rate hovered in the 20 to 30 percent range for most of its early years as it opened during an economic slowdown in Alaska. It was sold to Northwestern Simon Inc. in 1994, and it has been operated by Simon Property Group ever since.

On August 13, 2011, an Apple Store opened at the mall near the sky bridge connected to Nordstrom, becoming the first Apple Store in Alaska.

Nordstrom closed permanently on September 13, 2019.

The mall was closed on March 18, 2020, due to the COVID-19 pandemic. It reopened on May 1, 2020.

Gap and Alaska's only Banana Republic location closed in 2022 and 2023. Lululemon replaced Banana Republic in 2023, becoming the retailer's second Alaska store after its Diamond Center location, also in Anchorage.

In 2026, plans were announced to convert the former Nordstrom anchor space into housing and retail space. The City of Anchorage owns the land and took control of maintenance of the building in 2024 from Nordstrom. The 80,000 square feet of interior space is expected to remain that size. Plans are in the development stage of the conversion and renovation of the anchor space.

== Facilities ==
=== Interior ===
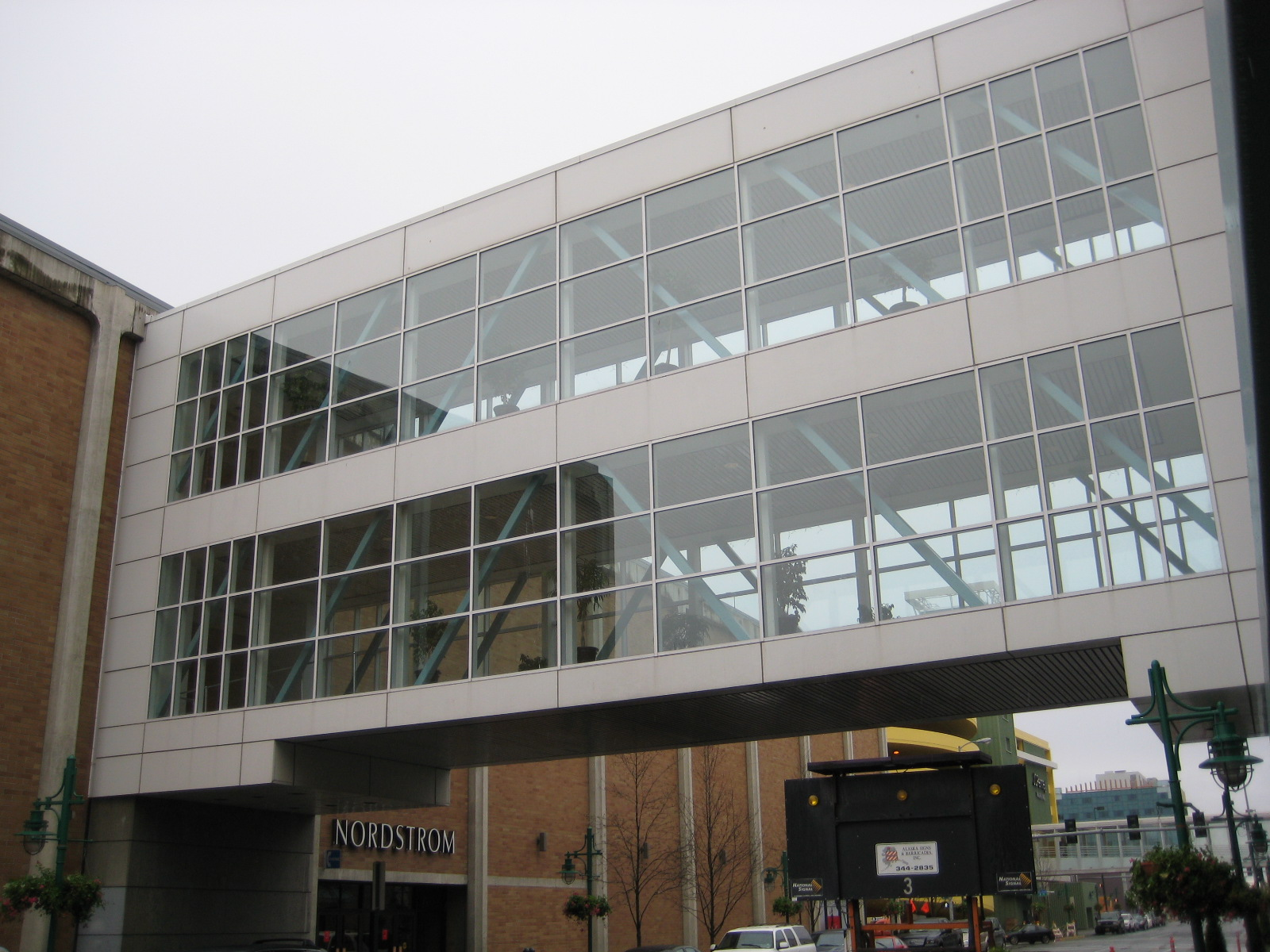
Two-story skyway above Sixth Avenue connects the mall with the former Nordstrom.

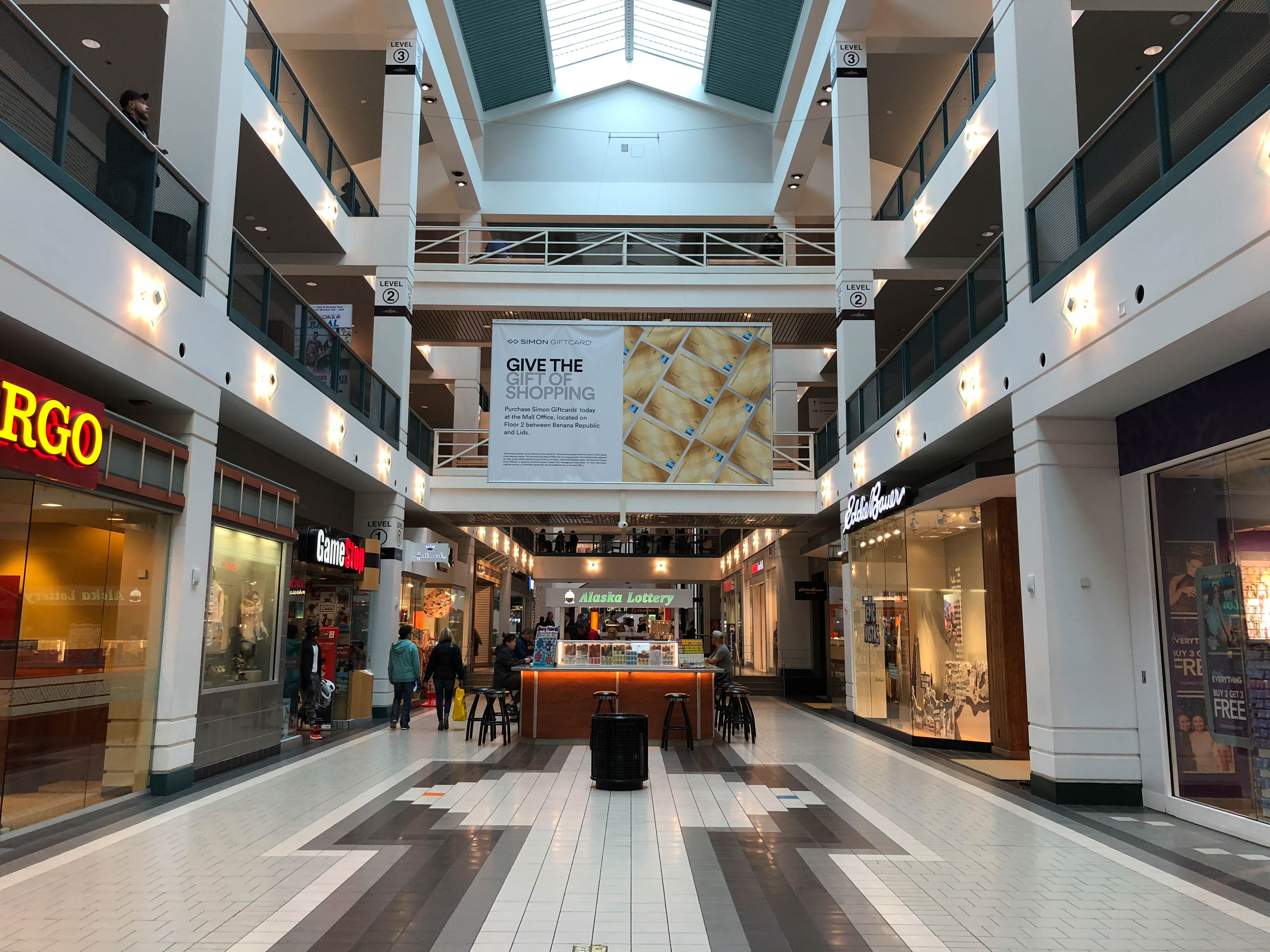
Concourse

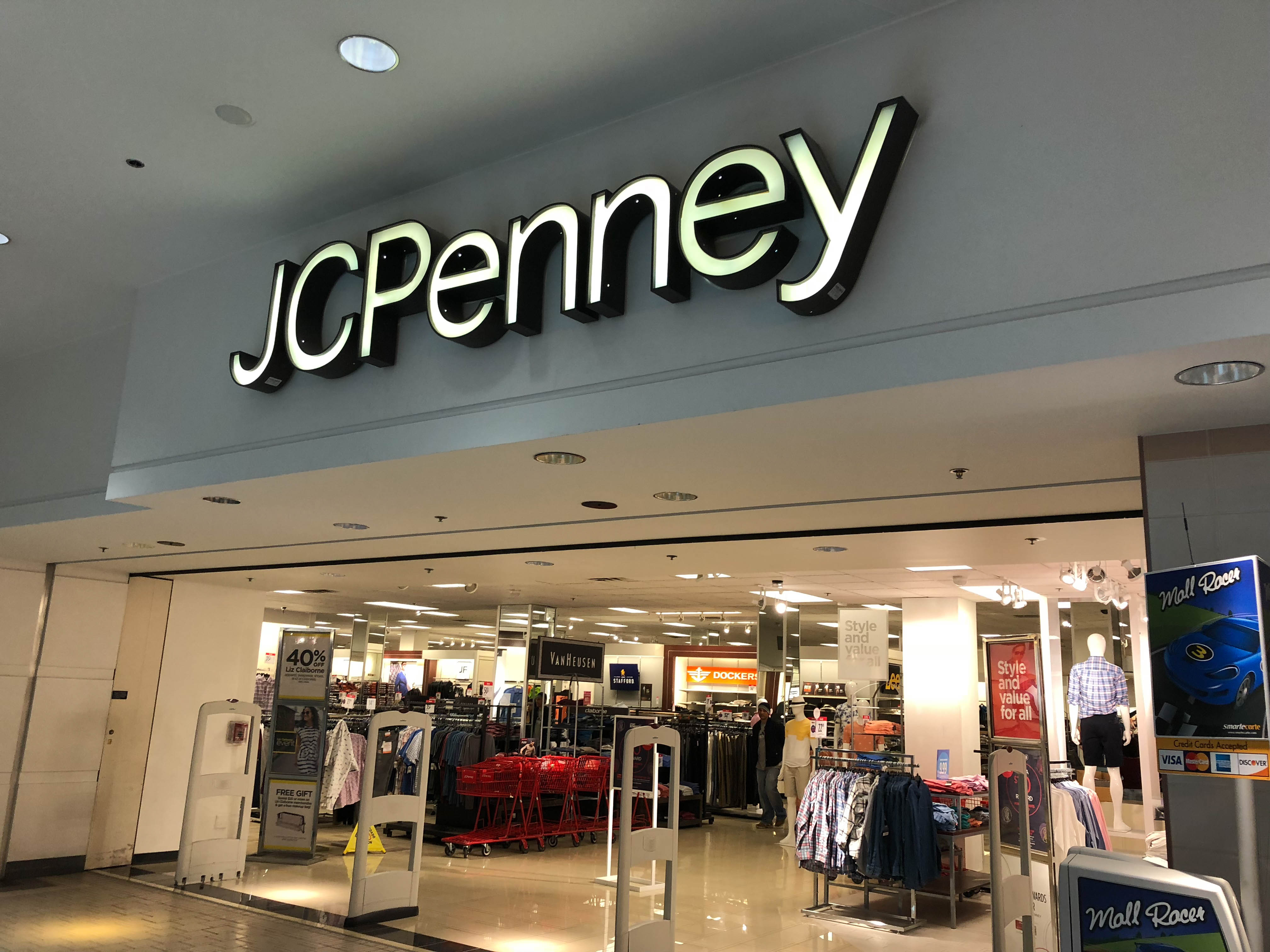
JCPenney at Anchorage 5th Avenue Mall

Compared to other malls in Alaska, the 5th Avenue Mall integrates many more aesthetic designs inside its buildings. Some examples are the sky-lit roof above the main arcade, and features galleria-style, wide, open spaces. The top floor of the arcade is a food court.

Most of the mall's elevators have glass panels and are decorated with neon lights. The mall uses sky bridges to provide indoor access between buildings and parking, contributing to the streetscape of 5th and 6th Avenues. The ground floor of the galleria functions as an indoor pedestrian extension of D Street.

=== Parking ===
Two parking garages are connected to the mall via sky bridge, one owned by the Anchorage Community Development Authority and the other by the operators of the JCPenney store.

== List of anchor stores ==
Name	No. of floors	Year opened	Year closed	Notes
JCPenney	4	1987	—N/a	
Nordstrom		1975	2019	Opened 12 years before the mall and was connected via sky bridge.
Apartment/Retail Anchor	4	—	—	
