= Fairview, Anchorage =

Neighborhood in Anchorage, Alaska

Coordinates: 61.210°N 149.867°W

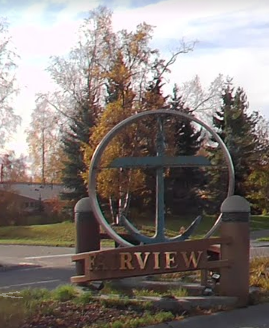
Fairview, Anchorage's sign by the neighborhood's Eastern entrance.

Fairview is a neighborhood in Anchorage, Alaska just east of Downtown Anchorage and west of the Merrill Field Airport. The area is a working-class neighborhood of approximately 7,200 residents, with a median household income of approximately $55,000 and a poverty rate of approximately 21%.

Fairview was once a separate city, but was annexed as a part of Anchorage in the 1950s. At the time, it was the only neighborhood in the city where African-Americans could buy property.

The neighborhood experienced a period of decline following the construction of the Seward Highway through the neighborhood (which is known as the Ingra Street/Gambell Street north-south couplet through the area). There are long-term plans to solve this issue by depressing the highway below-grade in this area.

== Infrastructure ==
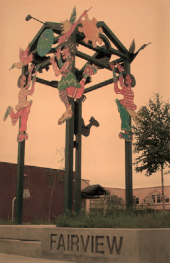
A sculpture on the west side of Fairview Elementary by the school's playground.

=== Education ===
Located at 1327 Nelchina Street, Fairview Elementary is a Title I school that falls under the Anchorage School District. The school was opened in 1997 and cost around $12 million to build. Currently, Fairview Elementary teaches grades K-6. In the 2018–2019 school year, there was a recorded total of 394 students enrolled.

=== Recreation ===
Fairview hosts several sports-related structures, including the Sullivan Arena, Ben Boeke Indoor Ice Arenas, Anchorage Football Stadium, Mulcahy Baseball Stadium, and the Chester Creek Sports Complex. In addition to all these sports stadiums and fields, Fairview also houses the Fairview Community Recreation Center, which includes a weight room, dance room, pottery room, and a reservable multipurpose room. Fairview also has multiple playgrounds, parks, and even a community garden.

=== Transportation ===
Fairview is one of the neighborhoods along the People Mover's frequent network, with the #30 bus operating along Cordova Street and 15th Avenue. There is also the #11 bus which circulates through the neighborhood, as well as the #31 bus at 9th Avenue and Ingra Street. Located by the Charles W. Smith Memorial Park in Southwest Fairview, there is an access point to the Chester Creek bike trail which connects to both Goose Lake and the Tony Knowles Coastal Trail. Additionally, Anchorage's Seward Highway and Glenn Highway connect towards the upper portion Fairview.
