= Muldoon, Anchorage =

Neighborhood of Anchorage, Alaska, United States

Coordinates: 61.2057°N 149.7334°W

Muldoon is a major neighborhood on the east side of Anchorage, Alaska. It is named for Muldoon Road, the most significant north–south thoroughfare in the northeast portion of Anchorage proper (the "Anchorage bowl"). Muldoon Road was named for Arnold L. Muldoon (1909–1985), a Wisconsin native of Irish descent who settled in the area during the early 1940s and originally built the road as a dirt track to connect to the existing road network at the Glenn Highway. Most of Muldoon's growth over the decades has been tied to development at the Anchorage area's two major military installations, Elmendorf Air Force Base and Fort Richardson, which were combined in 2010 to form the current Joint Base Elmendorf-Richardson.

The neighborhood is a hub of the People Mover bus system, with the #10 (Northern Lights), #25 (Muldoon/Tudor/A Street/C Street), and #30 (Debarr) buses all converging at the intersection of Muldoon Road & Debarr Road.
