= 1964 Alaska earthquake =

Second most powerful earthquake in recorded history

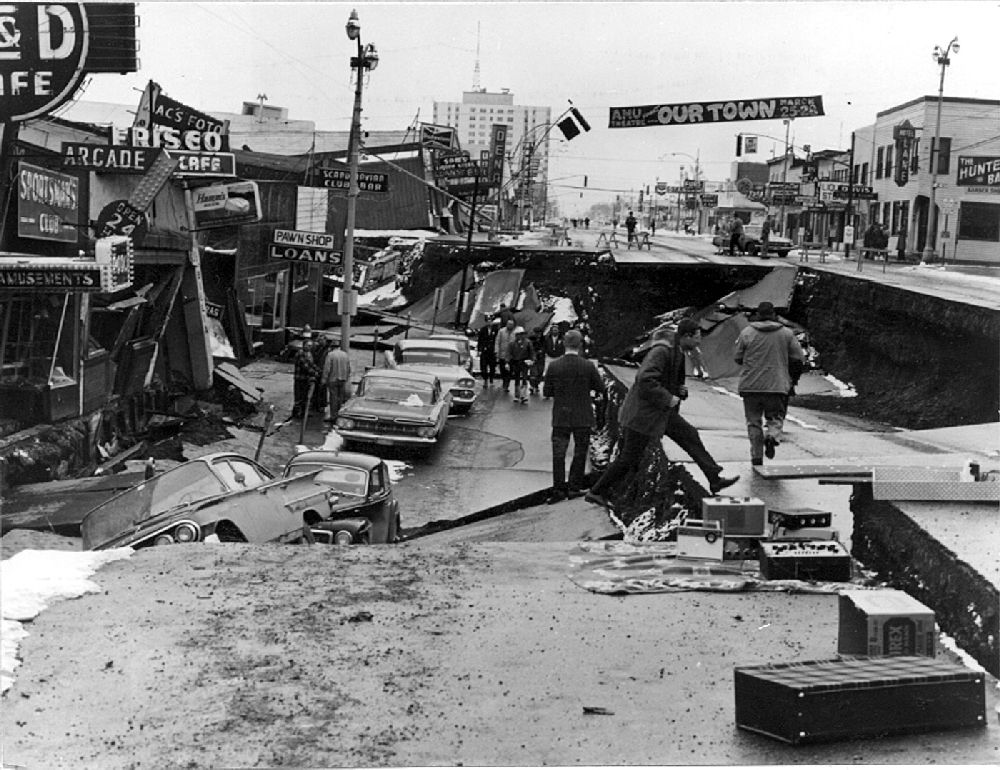
- Fourth Avenue in Anchorage, Alaska, looking east from near C Street. The southern edge of one of several landslides in Anchorage, this one covered an area of over a dozen blocks, including five blocks along the north side of Fourth Avenue. Most of the area was razed and made an urban renewal district.

- UTC time: 1964-03-28 03:36:16
- ISC event: 869809
- USGS-ANSS: ComCat
- Local date: March 27, 1964; 62 years ago
- Local time: 17:36:16 AKST (Note: At the time of the disaster, Alaska was divided between four separate time zones, Anchorage was five hours behind Eastern Standard Time. See Time in Alaska.)
- Duration: 4–5 minutes
- Magnitude: M_{w} 9.2–9.3
- Depth: 25 kilometers (16 mi)
- Epicenter: 60.9079°N 147.3389°W
- Type: Megathrust
- Areas affected: United States, Canada
- Total damage: $311 million (1964 USD) [$2.94 billion (2022 USD)]
- Max. intensity: MMI X (Extreme)
- Peak acceleration: 0.14-0.18 g
- Tsunami: Major. Run-up of 67 m (220 ft) at Shoup Bay, Alaska.
- Casualties: 139 deaths

The 1964 Alaska earthquake, also known as the Great Alaska earthquake and Good Friday earthquake, occurred at 5:36 PM AKST on Good Friday, March 27, 1964. Across south-central Alaska, ground fissures, collapsing structures, and tsunamis resulting from the earthquake caused about 139 deaths.

Lasting four minutes and thirty-eight seconds, the magnitude 9.2–9.3 megathrust earthquake remains the most powerful earthquake ever recorded in North America and the second most powerful earthquake ever recorded in the world since modern seismography began in 1900. Six hundred miles (970 km) of fault ruptured at once and moved up to 60 ft (18 m), releasing about 500 years of stress buildup. Soil liquefaction, fissures, landslides, and other ground failures caused major structural damage in several communities and much damage to property. Anchorage sustained great destruction or damage to many inadequately earthquake-engineered houses, buildings, and infrastructure (paved streets, sidewalks, water and sewer mains, electrical systems, and other man-made equipment), particularly in the several landslide zones along Knik Arm. Two hundred miles (320 km) southwest, some areas near Kodiak were permanently raised by 30 feet (9 m). Southeast of Anchorage, areas around the head of Turnagain Arm near Girdwood and Portage dropped as much as 8 feet (2.4 m), requiring reconstruction and fill to raise the Seward Highway above the new high tide mark.

In Prince William Sound, Port Valdez suffered a massive underwater landslide, resulting in the deaths of 32 people between the collapse of the Valdez city harbor and docks and inside the ship that was docked there at the time. Nearby, a 27-foot (8.2 m) tsunami destroyed the village of Chenega, killing 23 of the 68 people who lived there. The survivors outran the wave, climbing to high ground. Post-quake tsunamis severely affected Whittier, Seward, Kodiak, and other Alaskan communities, as well as people and property in British Columbia, Washington, Oregon, and California. Tsunamis also caused damage in Hawaii and Japan. Evidence of motion directly related to the earthquake was also reported from Florida and Texas.

== Geology ==
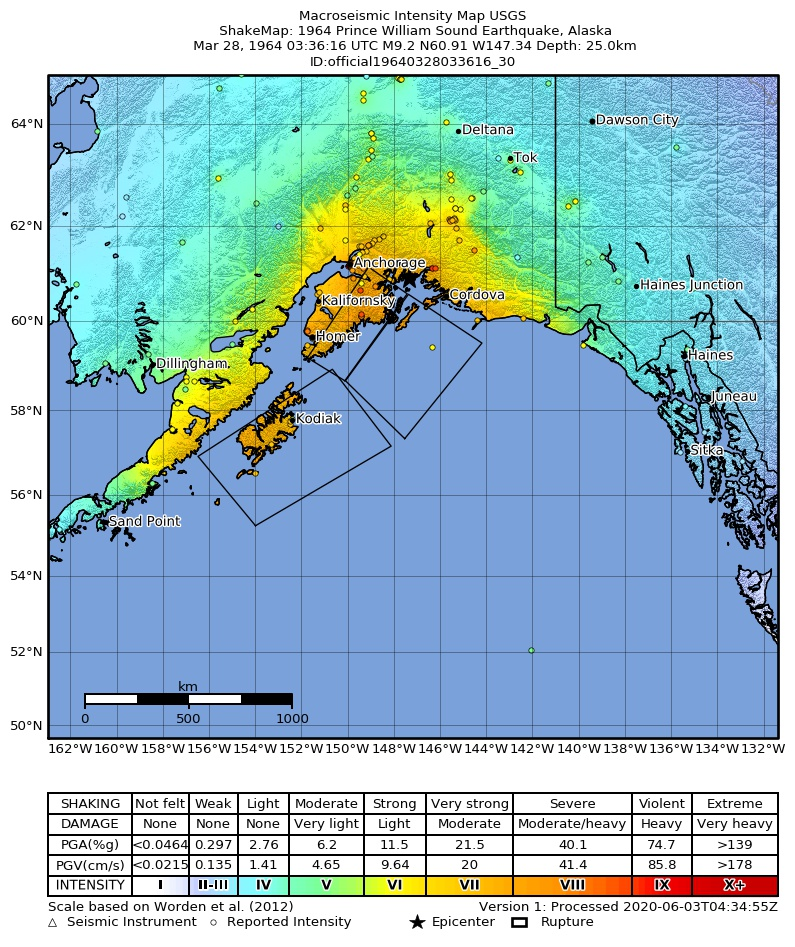
USGS ShakeMap of the earthquake.

On March 27, 1964, at 5:36 p.m. AKST (March 28, at 3:36 a.m. UTC), a fault between the Pacific and North American plates ruptured near College Fjord in Prince William Sound. The epicenter of the earthquake was 12.4 mi (20.0 km) north of Prince William Sound, 78 miles (126 km) east of Anchorage and 40 miles (64 km) west of Valdez. The focus occurred at a depth of approximately 15.5 mi (24.9 km). Ocean floor shifts created large tsunamis (up to 220 feet (67 m) in height), which resulted in many of the deaths and much of the property damage. The earthquake also caused large rockslides, resulting in great property damage. Vertical displacement of up to 38 feet (12 m) occurred, affecting an area of 100,000 square miles (260,000 km^{2}) within Alaska.

Studies of ground motion have led to a peak ground acceleration estimate of 0.14–0.18 g. The earthquake was assigned a maximum Modified Mercalli intensity of X (Extreme). Shaking was felt across much of Alaska and parts of western Yukon and British Columbia in Canada.

The Alaska earthquake was a subduction zone (megathrust) earthquake, caused by an oceanic plate sinking under a continental plate. The fault responsible was the Aleutian Megathrust, a reverse fault caused by a compressional force. This caused much of the uneven ground, the result of shifting to the opposite elevation. Uplift occurred across 520,000 km^{2} (200,000 sq mi) from southern Kodiak to Prince William Sound and further east of the sound. The maximum uplift was in Montague Island, where the ground was raised 13–15 m (43–49 ft) relative to sea level. The uplift also affected Kodiak, Sitkalidak, and Sitkinak islands. Subsidence was observed for 285,000 km^{2} (110,000 sq mi) from north and west of the sound, in Chugach Mountains, most of Kenai Peninsula, and almost all the Kodiak Island group.

== Tsunami ==
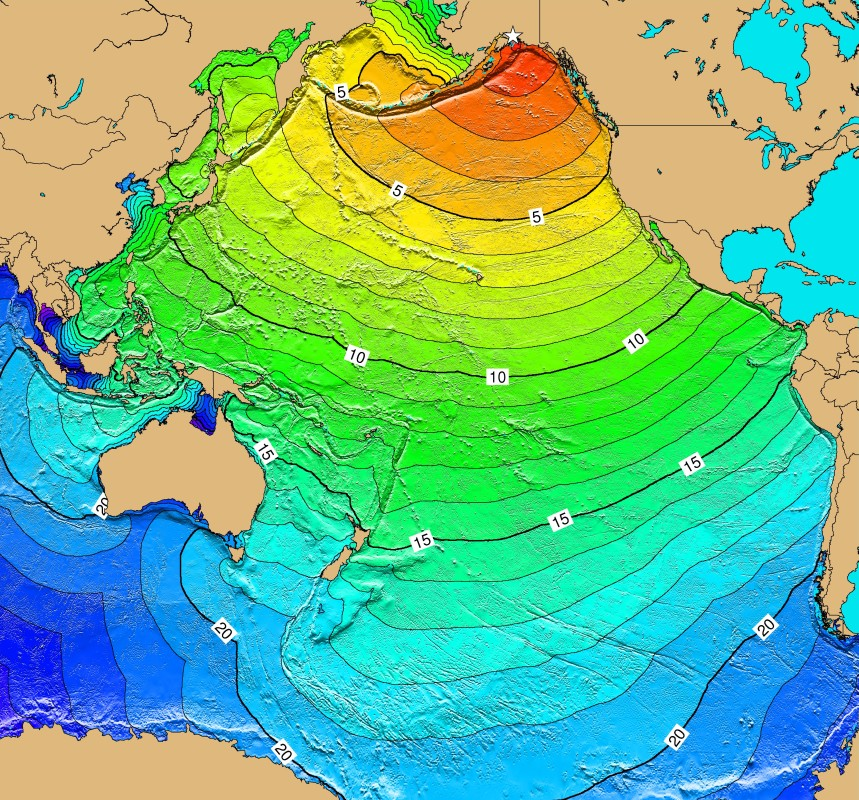
Calculated travel time map for the tectonic tsunami produced by the 1964 Prince William Sound earthquake in Alaska. Tsunami Travel Times computed using Tsunami Travel Times software v3.1 (P. Wessel). The map does not show the height or strength of the waves, only the calculated travel times.: Red: 1- to 4-hour arrival times; Yellow: 5- to 6-hour arrival times; Green: 7- to 14-hour arrival times; Blue: 15- to 21-hour arrival times.

Two types of tsunami were produced by this subduction zone earthquake. There was a tectonic tsunami produced in addition to about 20 smaller and local tsunamis. These smaller tsunamis were produced by submarine and subaerial landslides and were responsible for the majority of the tsunami damage. Tsunami waves were noted in over 20 countries, including Peru, New Zealand, Papua New Guinea, Japan, Mexico, and in the continent of Antarctica. The largest tsunami wave was recorded in Shoup Bay, near Valdez, Alaska, with a height of about 220 ft (67 m).

== Death toll, damage, and casualties ==
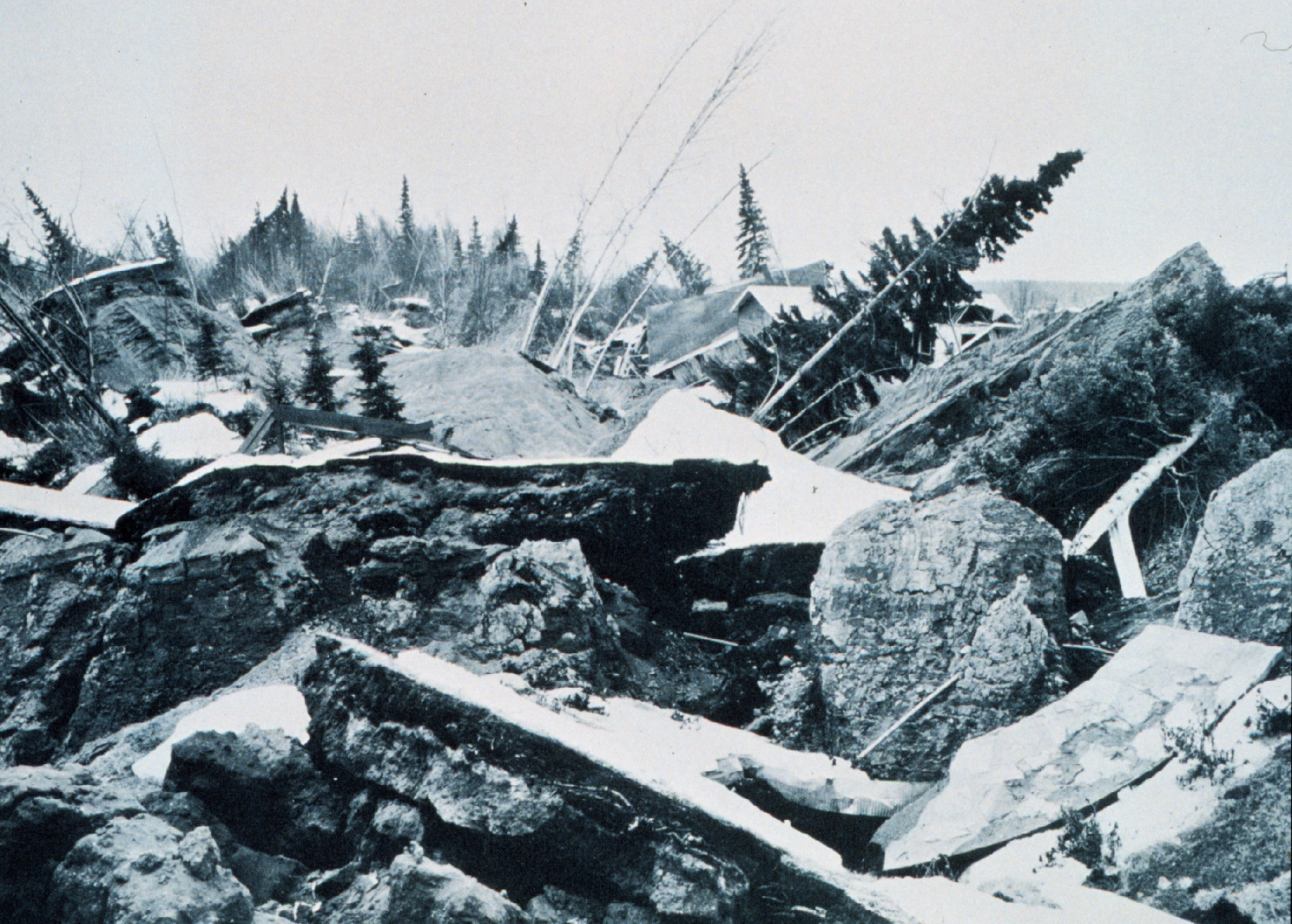
The largest landslide in Anchorage occurred along Knik Arm between Point Woronzof and Fish Creek, causing substantial damage to numerous homes in the Turnagain-By-The-Sea subdivision.

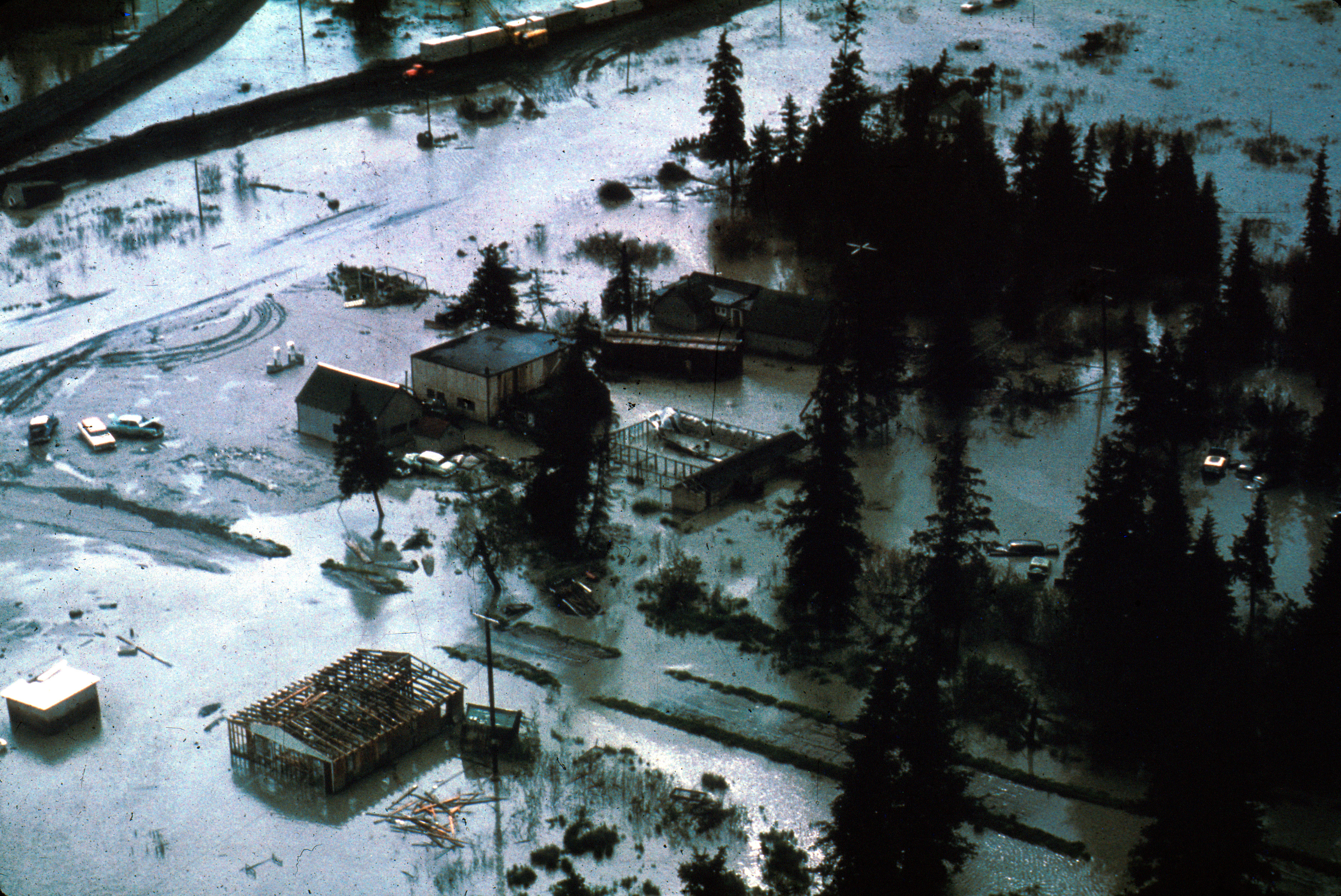
The ruin of Portage

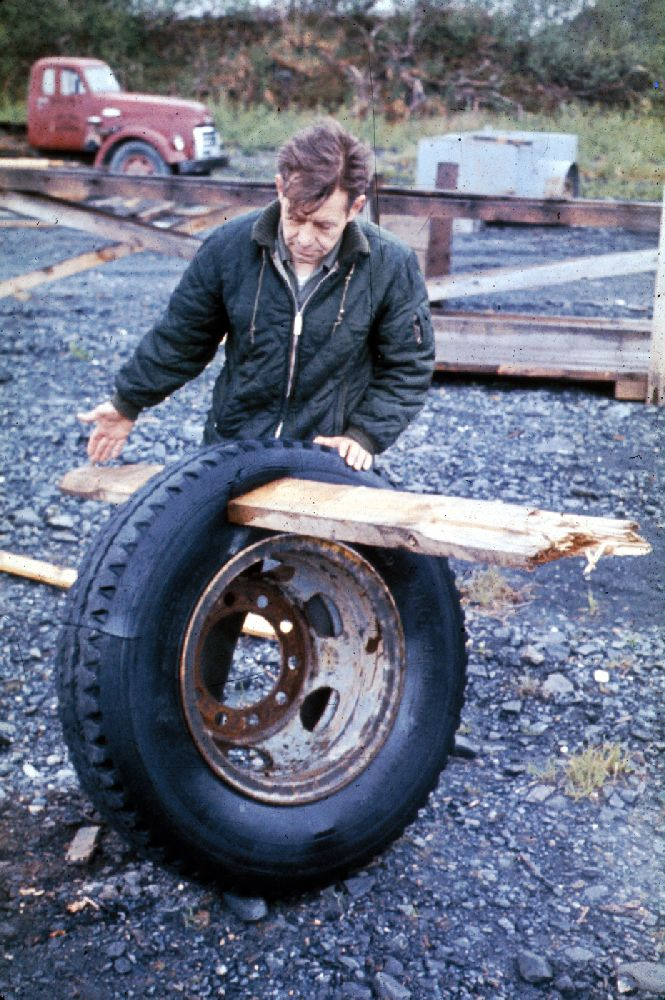
A plank driven through a tire by the tsunami in Whittier

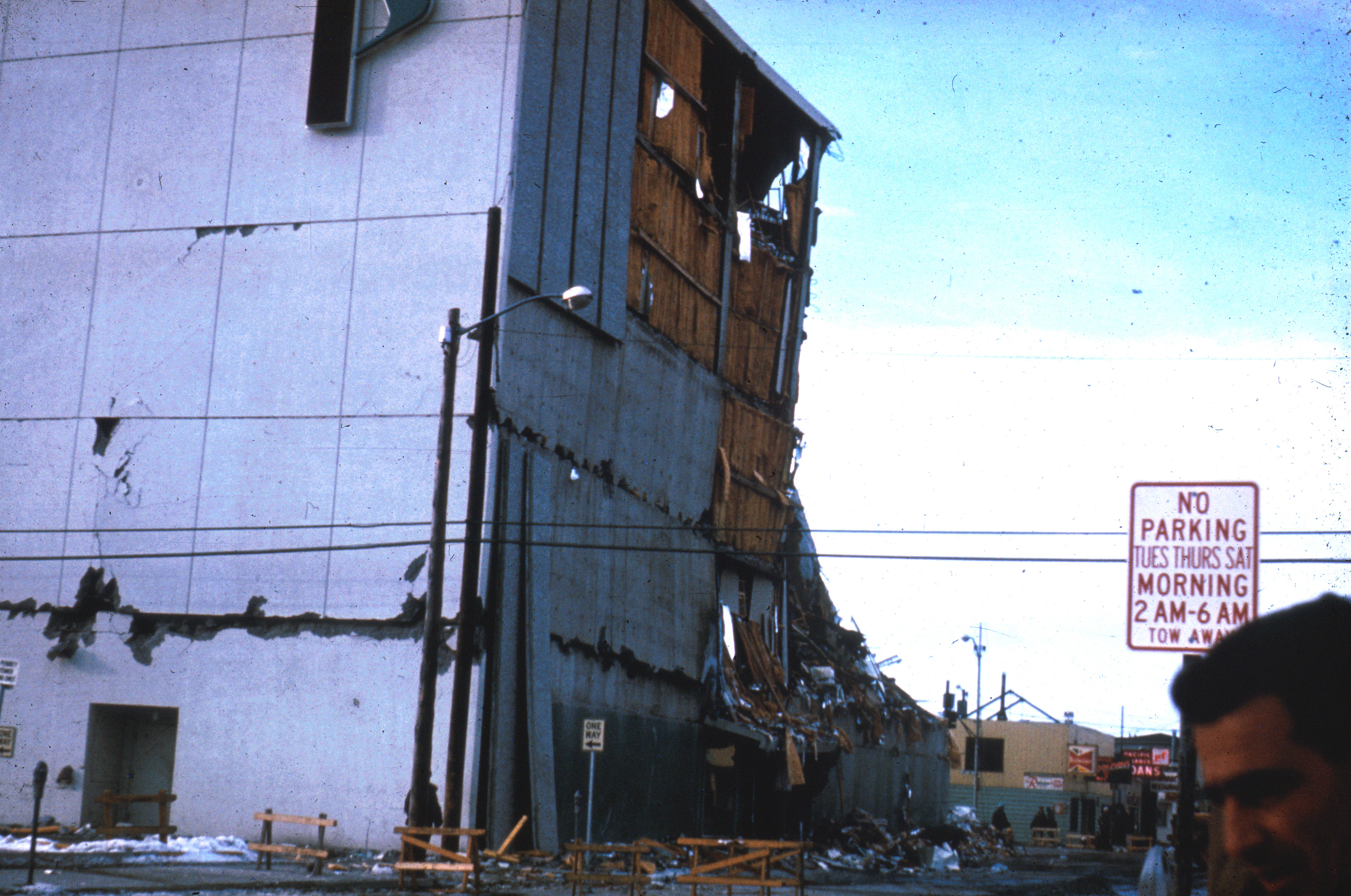
The 5-story JCPenney department store in Anchorage in 1964, following the earthquake

As a result of the earthquake, 139 people are believed to have died: Fifteen died as a result of the earthquake itself and another 124 died from the subsequent tsunamis in Alaska, Oregon, and California. Five died from the tsunami in Oregon, and 13 died from the tsunami in California, mostly in or near Crescent City. Property damage was estimated at $116 million ($919 million in 2025 dollars).

United States Geological Survey video explaining the earthquake and footage

=== Anchorage area ===
Most damage occurred in Anchorage, 75 mi (121 km) northwest of the epicenter. Anchorage was not hit by tsunamis, but downtown Anchorage was heavily damaged, and parts of the city built on sandy bluffs overlying "Bootlegger Cove clay" near Cook Inlet, most notably the Turnagain neighborhood, suffered landslide damage. The neighborhood lost 75 houses in the landslide, and the destroyed area has since been turned into Earthquake Park. The Government Hill school suffered from the Government Hill landslide, leaving it in two jagged, broken pieces. Land overlooking the Ship Creek valley near the Alaska Railroad yards also slid, destroying many acres of buildings and city blocks in downtown Anchorage. Most other areas of the city were only moderately damaged. The concrete control tower at Anchorage International Airport collapsed, killing the controller on the top floor, as well as trapping two cooks on the first floor, who were later rescued.

One house on W. 10th Avenue suffered peripheral damage, but only one block away the recently completed (and still unoccupied) Four Seasons Building on Ninth Avenue collapsed completely, with the concrete elevator shafts sticking up out of the rubble like a seesaw.

The hamlets of Girdwood and Portage, located 30 and 40 mi (48 and 64 km) southeast of central Anchorage on the Turnagain Arm, were destroyed by subsidence and subsequent tidal action. Girdwood was relocated inland and Portage was abandoned. About 20 miles (32 km) of the Seward Highway sank below the high-water mark of Turnagain Arm; the highway and its bridges were raised and rebuilt in 1964–66.

=== Elsewhere in Alaska ===
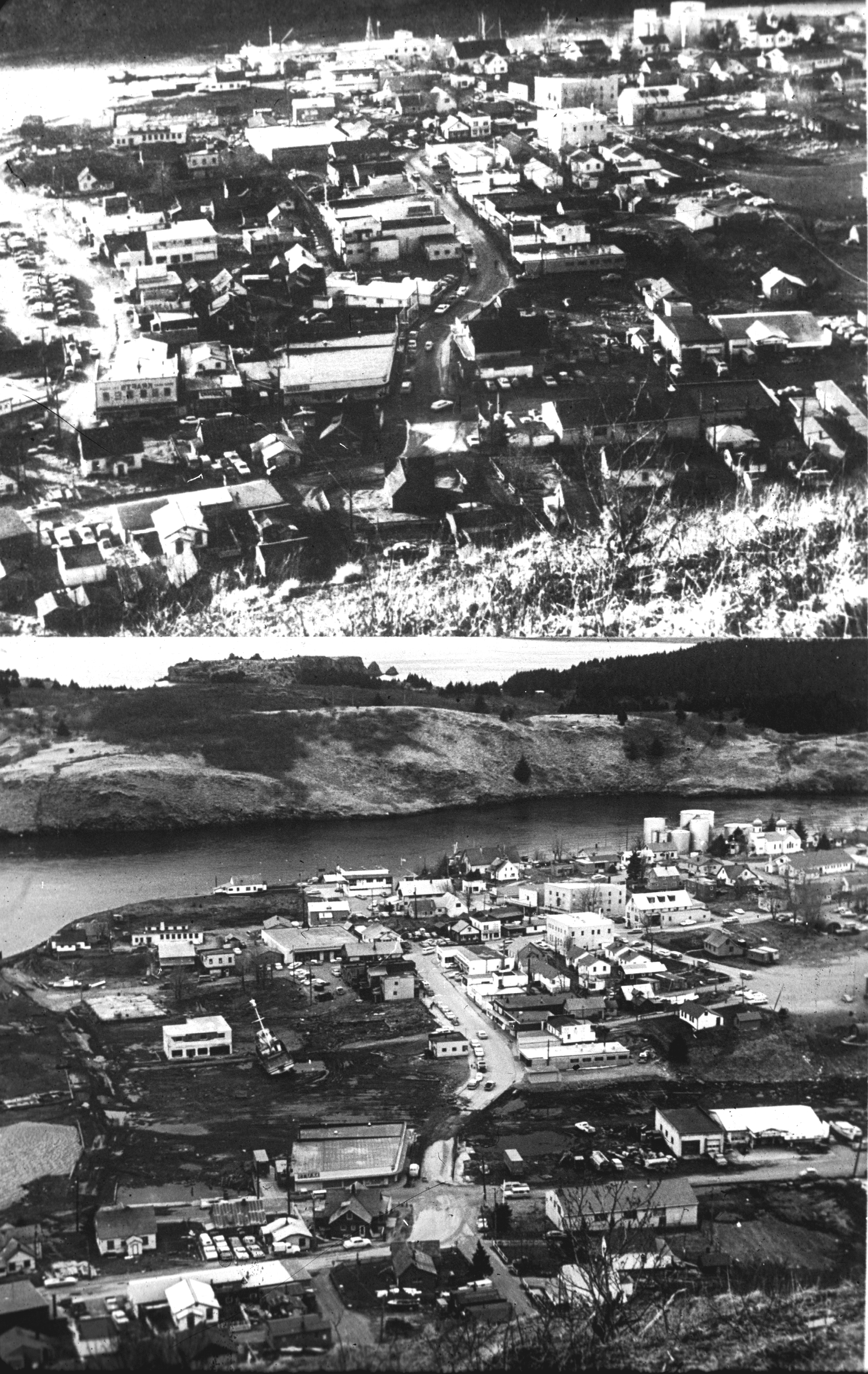
Kodiak before and after the earthquake

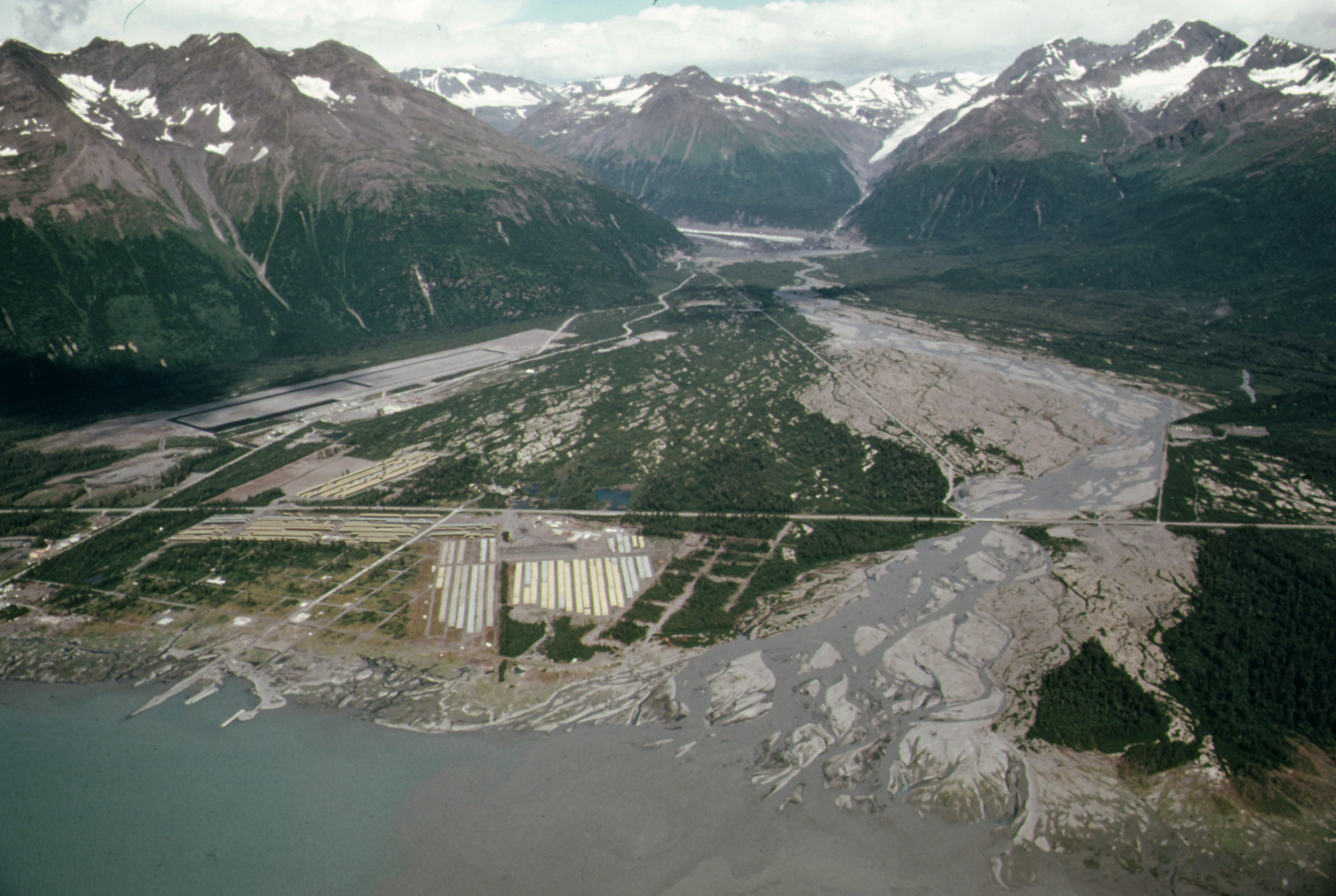
The Valdez townsite was abandoned and relocated following the 1964 earthquake and was used as a pipe yard for the construction of the Trans-Alaska Pipeline System, as shown in this 1974 photo

Most coastal towns in the Prince William Sound, Kenai Peninsula, and Kodiak Island areas, especially the major ports of Seward, Whittier and Kodiak were heavily damaged by a combination of seismic activity, subsidence, post-quake tsunamis and/or earthquake-caused fires. Valdez with 32 dead was not totally destroyed, but after three years, the town relocated to higher ground four miles (6.4 km) west of its original site. Some Alaska Native villages, including Chenega and Afognak, were destroyed or damaged. The earthquake caused the ballistic missile detection radar of Clear Air Force Station to go offline for six minutes, the only unscheduled interruption in its operational history. Near Cordova, the Million Dollar Bridge crossing the Copper River also suffered damage, with Span #4 slipping off its pylon and collapsing. The community of Girdwood was also confined to the southern side of the Seward Highway when water rushed into Turnagain Arm and flooded or destroyed any buildings left standing to the north of the highway. Only the ground immediately along the highway and that on the north side of the road dropped, prompting geologists to speculate that Girdwood may rest upon an ancient cliff face covered by thousands of years of sediment and glacial deposits.

=== Canada ===
A 4.5 ft (1.4 m) wave reached Prince Rupert, British Columbia, just south of the Alaska Panhandle, about three hours after the earthquake. The tsunami then reached Tofino, on the exposed west coast of Vancouver Island, and traveled up a fjord to hit Port Alberni twice, washing away 55 homes and damaging 375 others. The towns of Hot Springs Cove, Zeballos, and Amai also saw damage. The damage in British Columbia was estimated at CA$10 million ($100 million in 2025 Canadian dollars or $96 million in 2025 US dollars).

=== Elsewhere ===
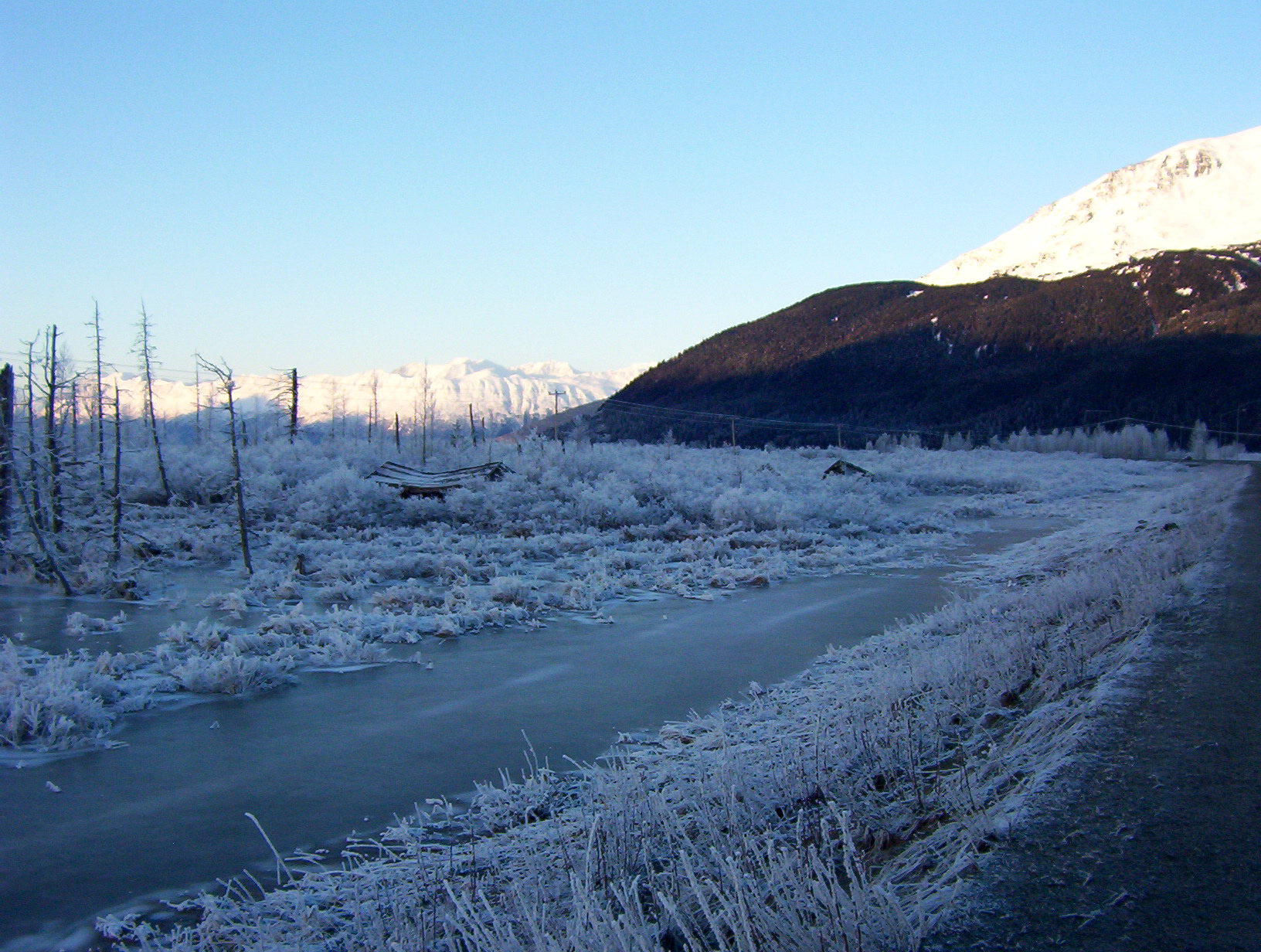
A winter scene of a "ghost forest" that was killed and preserved by salt water along with ruined buildings at the site of the former town of Portage, 2011

Ten people were killed by the tsunami in Crescent City, California, and one other man was killed near Requa, California after being swept out to sea while fishing in the Klamath River. Four children were killed while camping with their parents on the Oregon coast at Beverly Beach State Park. An additional death that is sometimes attributed to the tsunami took place in Bolinas, California; a fisherman wading into a seaside channel at Duxbury Point was swept into the ocean by a strong surge that took place 13 hours after the initial tidal surge. Crescent City was particularly hard-hit, with 30 blocks destroyed, representing half of the city's waterfront business district. The total damage to Crescent City was estimated at $7.4 million ($76 million in 2025 dollars). Other coastal towns and harbors in the Pacific Northwest, California, and Hawaii were damaged, often extensively. Damage to harbors and boats occurred as far south as Long Beach, California. Effects of the earthquake were even noted as far east as Freeport, Texas, where tide gauges recorded waves similar to seismic surface waves. Seiches were detected in wells in countries around the world, including England, Namibia, and Australia.

== Aftershocks ==
There were hundreds of aftershocks in the first weeks following the main shock. In the first day alone, eleven major aftershocks with a magnitude greater than 6.0 were recorded. Nine more struck over the next three weeks. In all, thousands of aftershocks occurred in the months following the quake, and smaller aftershocks continued to strike the region for more than a year.

Main shock and aftershocks from 1964-1-1 to 1964-12-31 (map data)

== Recovery efforts ==
Alaska had never experienced a major disaster in a highly populated area before, and had very limited resources for dealing with the effects of such an event. In Anchorage, at the urging of geologist Lidia Selkregg, the City of Anchorage and the Alaska State Housing Authority appointed a team of 40 scientists, including geologists, soil scientists, and engineers, to assess the damage done by the earthquake to the city. The team, called the Engineering and Geological Evaluation Group, was headed by Dr. Ruth A. M. Schmidt, a geology professor at the University of Alaska Anchorage. The team of scientists came into conflict with local developers and downtown business owners who wanted to immediately rebuild; the scientists wanted to identify future dangers to ensure that rebuilt infrastructure would be safe. The team produced a report on May 8, 1964, just a little more than a month after the earthquake.

The United States military, which has a large active presence in Alaska, also stepped in to assist within moments of the end of the quake. The U.S. Army rapidly re-established communications with the lower 48 states, deployed troops to assist the citizens of Anchorage, and dispatched a convoy to Valdez. On the advice of military and civilian leaders, President Lyndon B. Johnson declared all of Alaska a major disaster area the day after the quake.

The U.S. Navy and U.S. Coast Guard deployed ships to isolated coastal communities to assist with immediate needs. Bad weather and poor visibility hampered air rescue and observation efforts the day after the quake, but on Sunday the 29th the situation improved and rescue helicopters and observation aircraft were deployed. A military airlift immediately began shipping relief supplies to Alaska, eventually delivering 2,570,000 pounds (1,170,000 kg) of food and other supplies.

Broadcast journalist Genie Chance assisted in recovery and relief efforts, staying on the KENI air waves over Anchorage for more than 24 continuous hours as the voice of calm from her temporary post within the Anchorage Public Safety Building. She was effectively designated as the public safety officer by the city's police chief. Chance provided breaking news of the catastrophic events that continued to develop following the magnitude 9.2 earthquake, and she served as the voice of the public safety office, coordinating response efforts, connecting available resources to needs around the community, disseminating information about shelters and prepared food rations, passing messages of well-being between loved ones, and helping to reunite families.

In the longer term, the U.S. Army Corps of Engineers led the effort to rebuild roads, clear debris, and establish new townsites for communities that had been completely destroyed, at a cost of $110 million. The West Coast and Alaska Tsunami Warning Center was formed as a direct response to the disaster. Federal disaster relief funds paid for reconstruction and financially supported the devastated infrastructure of Alaska's government, spending hundreds of millions of dollars that helped keep Alaska financially solvent until the discovery of significant oil deposits at Prudhoe Bay. At the order of the U.S. Defense Department, the Alaska National Guard established the Alaska Division of Emergency Services to respond to any future disasters.

== See also ==
- List of earthquakes in Alaska
