= Sand Lake (Anchorage) =

Lake in the state of Alaska, United States

- Location within Alaska
- Location: Anchorage, Alaska, United States
- Coordinates: 61°09′05″N 149°57′58″W
- Surface area: 78 acres (320,000 m^{2})

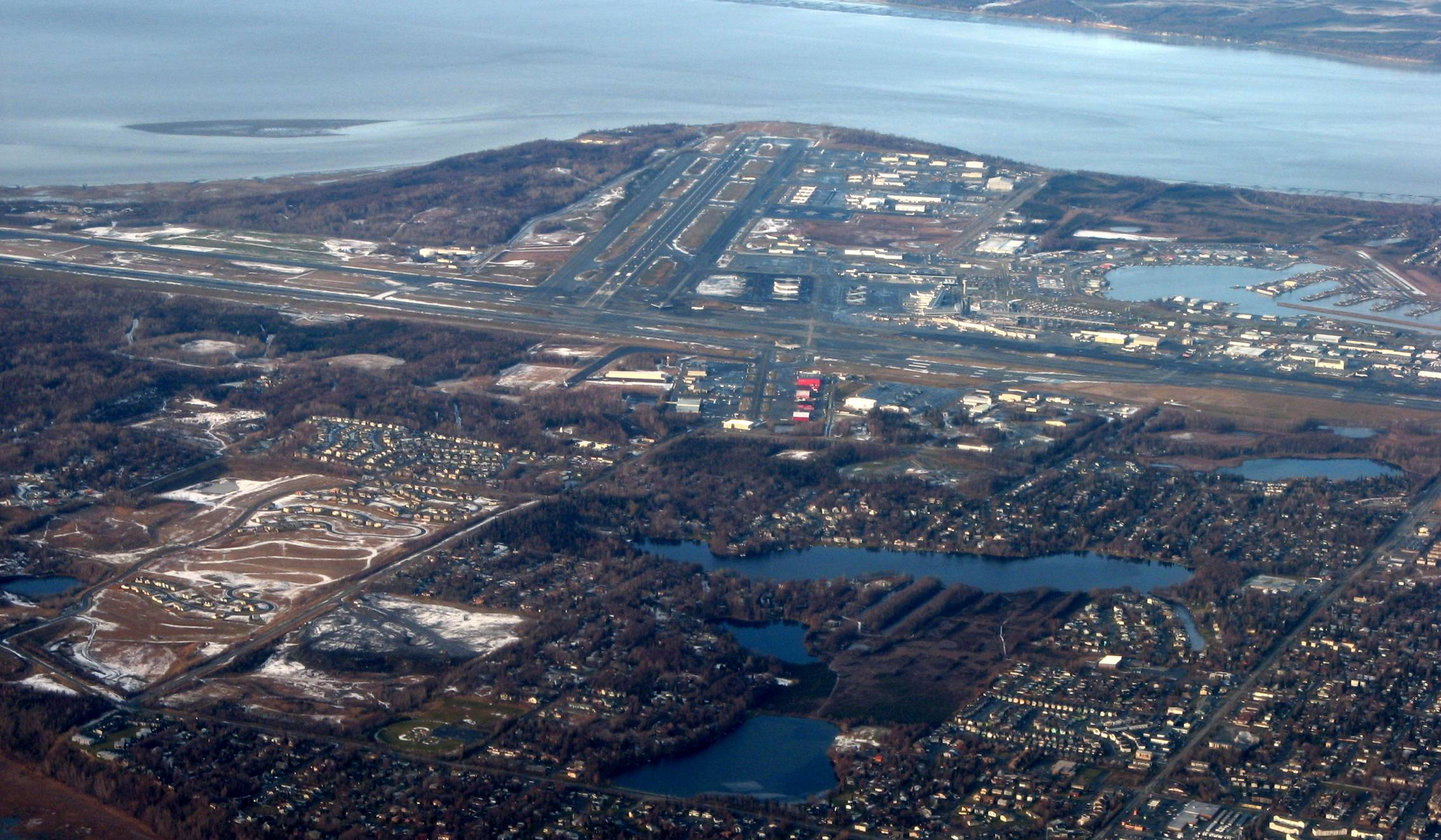
Aerial view of the Sand Lake area of Anchorage. Knik Arm, Ted Stevens Anchorage International Airport and Lake Hood Seaplane Base are at top. Kincaid Park is at left. At bottom right, looking down from the right edge, are Delong Lake, Sand Lake, Sundi Lake and Jewel Lake.

In Anchorage, Alaska, Sand Lake is the area surrounding Sand Lake, a stocked lake in the southwest part of the city. It is south of the Ted Stevens International Airport and Lake Spenard. The lake itself has a surface area of 78 acres (320,000 m^{2}). It is one of the few big-city lakes in the world with common and Pacific loon populations. Its shores are mostly privately owned, but a small park to the northeast allows public access. Kayakers, fishermen, picnickers and birdwatchers frequent the area.

The lake is stocked with fish by the Alaska Department of Fish and Game with rainbow trout and arctic char. Northern pike, illegally introduced to the lake, are significant predators on rainbow trout and have a detrimental impact on these populations. In 2006 residents of the lake asked the Alaska Department of Fish and Game (ADF&G) for help in removing northern pike from the lake and initial planning began resulting in the application of the fish poison rotenone in 2009 to restore the fishery. In 2010 surveys confirmed that the lake was free of northern pike and ADF&G restocked the lake with rainbow trout, Arctic char, and Arctic grayling.

In July 2011 an invasive aquatic plant, Elodea, was discovered in dense growths in Sand Lake as well as nearby DeLong and Little Campbell Lakes. It has also been found in Chena Slough and Chena Lakes in Fairbanks; a few lakes near Cordova; and Daniels, Stormy, and Beck Lakes on the Kenai Peninsula. It is suspected that it may have entered the lake through the dumping of an aquarium as this species is a popular aquatic plant used by aquarium hobbyists and is commonly used as a teaching specimen in local middle schools. This introduction is of much concern due to Elodea's ability to negatively impact recreational uses, floatplane operations, fish and wildlife habitat, and property values.

Another local attraction is Kincaid Park to the west. Generally, the residential area becomes more affluent near the lake, with a wide range of demographics expanding out.

The local High School is Dimond High School although some students attend South Anchorage High School.

The neighborhood was hard hit by the 2005 National Scout Jamboree accident, which killed four Anchorage residents.

Recent developments in the area include the addition of over 700 homes to in the new West Park subdivision, one of the largest additions to Anchorage in years.

== See also ==
- Neighborhoods of Anchorage, Alaska
