= List of streams named Fish Creek =

The following is a list of creeks named Fish Creek grouped by region and country.

== Creeks ==
- Fish Creek (Western Australia)

=== Canada ===
- Fish Creek runs from Charlie Lake to the Beatton River near Fort St. John, British Columbia
- Fish Creek, Saskatchewan, northeast of Saskatoon and site of the Battle of Fish Creek

=== United States ===
==== Alaska ====
- Fish Creek, Anchorage, Alaska area
- Fish Creek, Bethel, Alaska area
- Fish Creek, Denali Borough, Alaska area
- Fish Creek, Juneau area
- Fish Creek, Ketchikan-Gateway area
- Fish Creek, Matanuska-Susitna area
- Fish Creek North Slope Borough area
- Fish Creek Prince of Wales-Outer Ketchikan area

==== Other states ====
- Fish Creek, Maricopa County; it runs west then northwest out of the Superstition Mountains
- Fish Creek, San Bernardino County
- Fish Creek, Routt County
- Fish Creek, in DeKalb County and Steuben County
- Fish Creek, Mitchell County Lat.: 43.22528; Long.: -92.68
- Fish Creek, Stillwater County, Montana
- Fish Creek, Niagara County, New York
- Fish Creek, Lewis County, New York and Oneida County, New York
- Fish Creek (Cape Fear River tributary), a stream in Harnett County, North Carolina
- Fish Creek, Williams County, Ohio
- Fish Creek, John Muir Wilderness, California
- Oregon:
  - Fish Creek, Baker County, Oregon
  - Fish Creek, Lincoln County, Oregon
- Fish Creek (Comb Wash), tributary to the Comb Wash, San Juan County, Utah
- Wyoming:
  - Fish Creek, Carbon County
  - Fish Creek, tributary to the Snake River, lowest point in Grand Teton National Park

== See also ==
- Fishkill (disambiguation), Dutch for Fish Creek
