= Mountain View, Anchorage =

Neighborhood in Anchorage, Alaska

Coordinates: 61.223°N 149.829°W

Mountain View is a neighborhood in northeast Anchorage, Alaska, with approximately 7,300 residents. Mountain View is one of the most diverse neighborhoods in the United States. It is between the Glenn Highway and Elmendorf Air Force Base, west of McCarrey Street and east of Post Road. It is a working-class neighborhood, with a median household income of approximately $51,000 and a poverty rate of approximately 26%.

== History ==
The neighborhood began in the 1940s as housing for Elmendorf Air Force Base construction workers. It became blighted in the 1980s, followed by extensive revitalization efforts in the 2000s.

== Demographics ==
Mountain View is the most diverse neighborhood in Anchorage, and one of the most diverse in the country. As of 2021, the largest ethnic group in Mountain View were Alaska Natives at 18.3% of the population, followed by Hispanics at 17.4%, Pacific Islanders at 15.5%, Africans at 15%, Asians at 13%, Multiracial people at 10.9%, and Whites at 9.8%. As of 2018, the largest countries of origin of immigrants in Mountain View were Samoa, the Dominican Republic, Nepal, the Philippines, Mexico, Honduras, Laos, and Sudan.

== Transportation ==
Mountain View is one of the highest-ridership residential neighborhoods on the People Mover system; the former #45 route is the highest-ridership route in the system. On October 23, 2017, it was split into two routes: The primary #20 route which runs from Downtown to the Alaska Native Medical Center via Commercial Drive & Bragaw Street, and the #21 which circulates through the neighborhood before continuing down Mountain View Drive to the Northway Mall and downtown Anchorage.
