= Fish Creek (Georgia) =

Stream in Polk County, Georgia, U.S.

Coordinates: 34°02′10″N 85°03′23″W

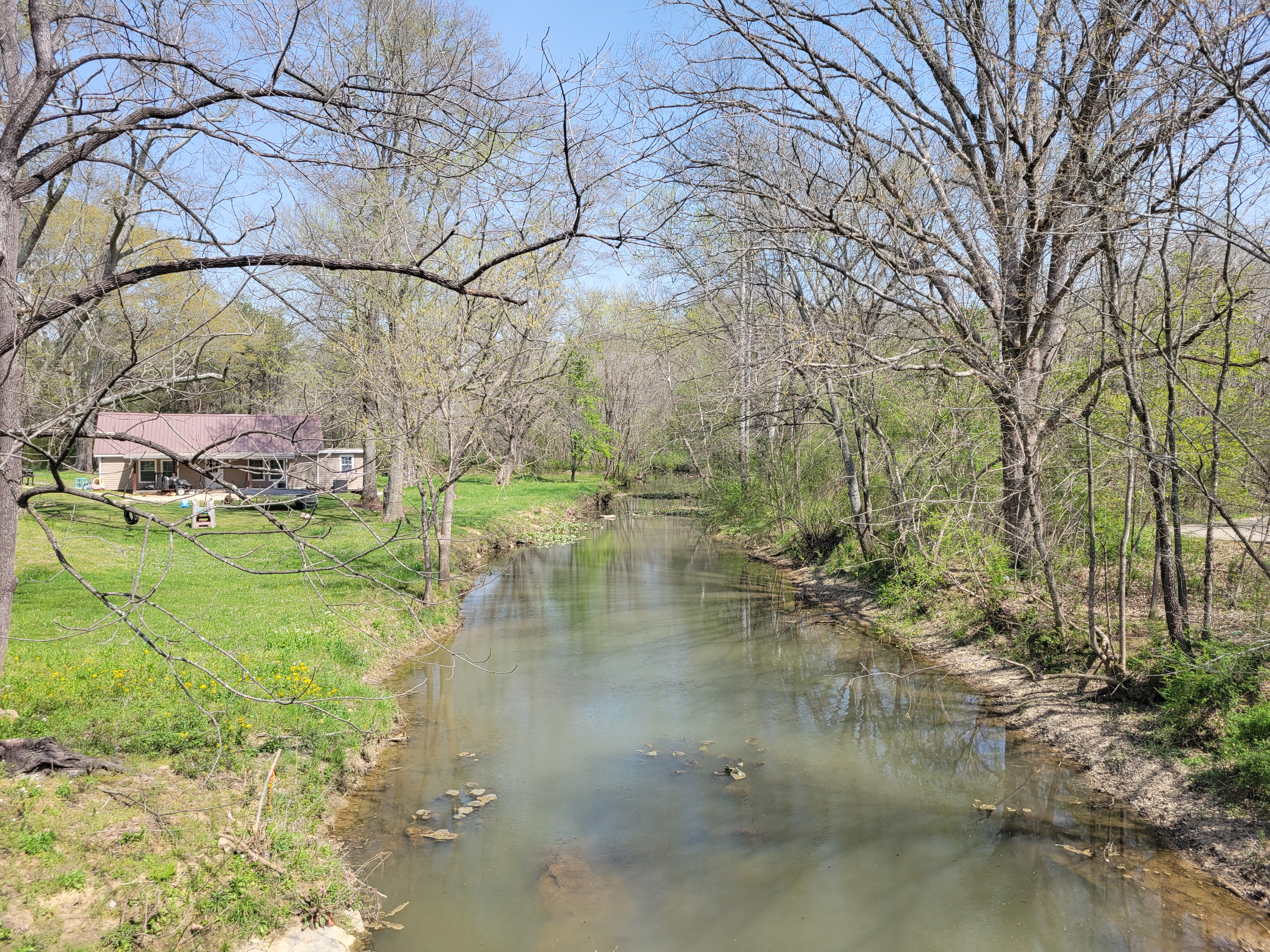
Fish Creek at Old Cedartown Road

Fish Creek is a stream in Polk County, in the U.S. state of Georgia.

Fish Creek may have been named after Chief Fish of the Cherokee.

== See also ==
- List of rivers of Georgia (U.S. state)
