= Fish Creek (Kansas) =

Stream in Bourbon County, Kansas, U.S.

Coordinates: 38.010035°N 94.704404°W

Fish Creek is a stream in Bourbon County, Kansas, in the United States.

Fish Creek was named from the fact it is well stocked with fish.

== See also ==
- List of rivers of Kansas
