= Anchorage Football Stadium =

Stadium in Anchorage, Alaska

The Anchorage Football Stadium is a 3,500-seat stadium in Anchorage, Alaska used for American football, track and field, and soccer. Anchorage Football Stadium is located next to Mulcahy Stadium and Sullivan Arena. It was one of the first sports facilities to have a FieldTurf surface installed in 1999.

On July 31, 2003, a Cessna 207 Skywagon plane carrying four passengers made an emergency crash landing on the stadium's track as a soccer match was taking place. Players and spectators from both Anchorage Football Stadium and neighboring Mulcahy Stadium rushed to the wreckage to assist those on board; all survived.
