= Fishkill =

Fishkill or Fish Kill is derived from the Dutch term Vis Kill, meaning "creek full of fish".

Fishkill or Fish Kill may also refer to:

== Communities ==
- Fishkill (town), New York, a town in Dutchess County
  - Fishkill, New York, a village within the above town
- East Fishkill, New York, a town in Dutchess County

== Other ==
- Fish kill, a localized die-off of fish and/or other aquatic populations
- Fishkill Correctional Facility, a medium security prison in Dutchess County
- Fishkill Creek, a tributary of the Hudson River
- Fishkill Farms, Dutchess County, New York

== See also ==
- East Fishkill Fire District, a volunteer firefighting organization in southern Dutchess County
