= Downtown Anchorage =

Neighborhood in the U.S. city of Anchorage, Alaska

Coordinates: 61°13′07″N 149°53′29″W

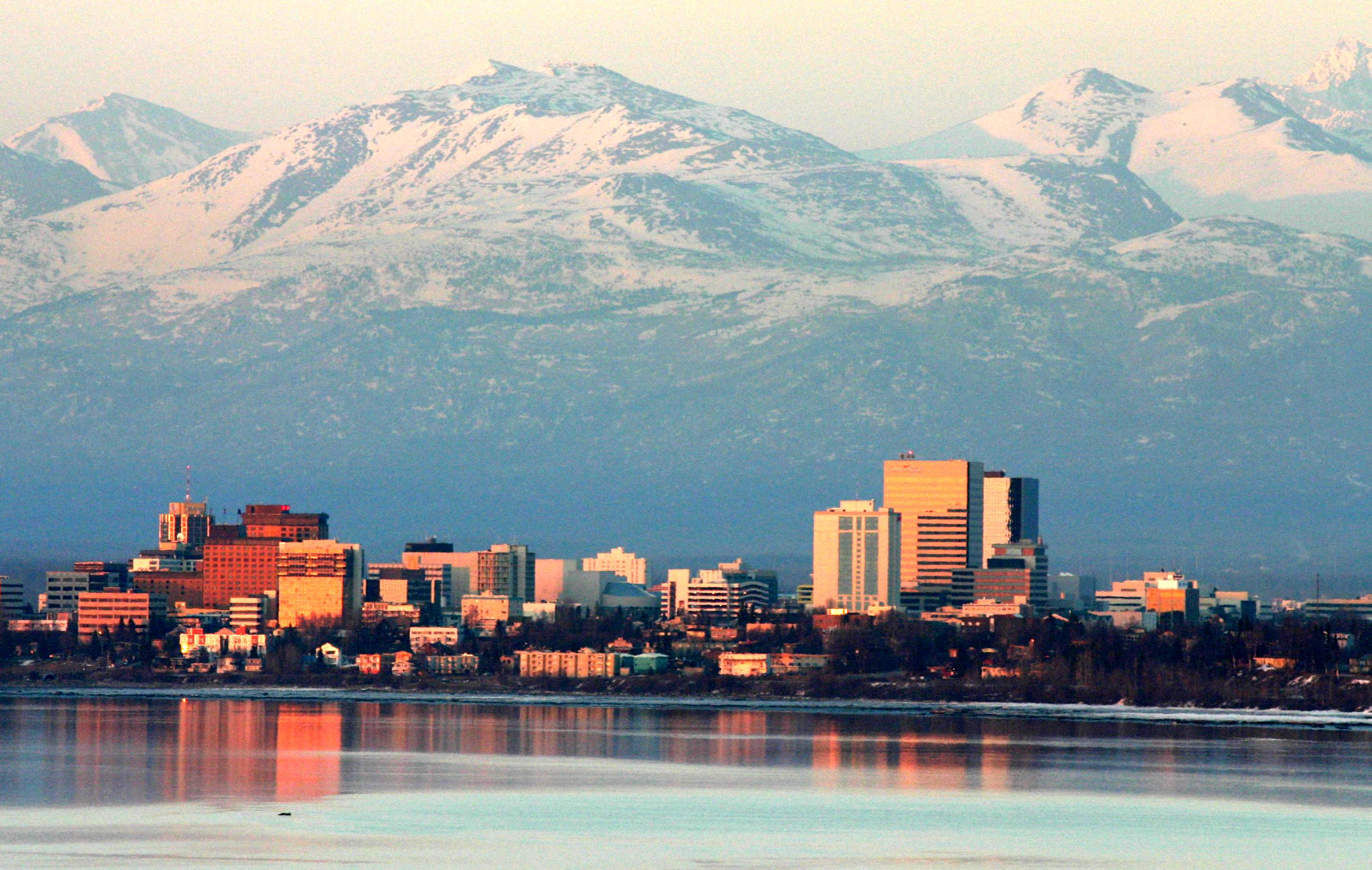
Downtown Anchorage skyline taken looking East across Knik Arm.

Downtown Anchorage is a neighborhood in the U.S. city of Anchorage, Alaska. Considered the central business district of Anchorage, Downtown has many office buildings, cultural points of interest, shopping areas, as well as dining and nightlife attractions. Today's Downtown was the original site of the Anchorage Land Auction in 1915, which gave rise to today's present-day grid street pattern. The actual original townsite was a tent city located off the banks of Ship Creek, at present-day Government Hill.

Downtown is a major employment center for the greater Anchorage region, drawing commuters from as far away as the Matanuska-Susitna Borough. The largest industries were services, government, and retail.

Downtown's architecture substantially defines the Anchorage skyline today. The tallest buildings in Alaska are located here, most notably the ConocoPhillips Building and the Atwood Building.

Downtown Anchorage's cleanliness, safety, and vitality are strongly controlled and advocated by the Anchorage Downtown Partnership.

== See also ==
- History of Anchorage, Alaska
- Neighborhoods of Anchorage, Alaska
