= Timeline of Anchorage, Alaska =

Coordinates: 61.217°N 149.900°W

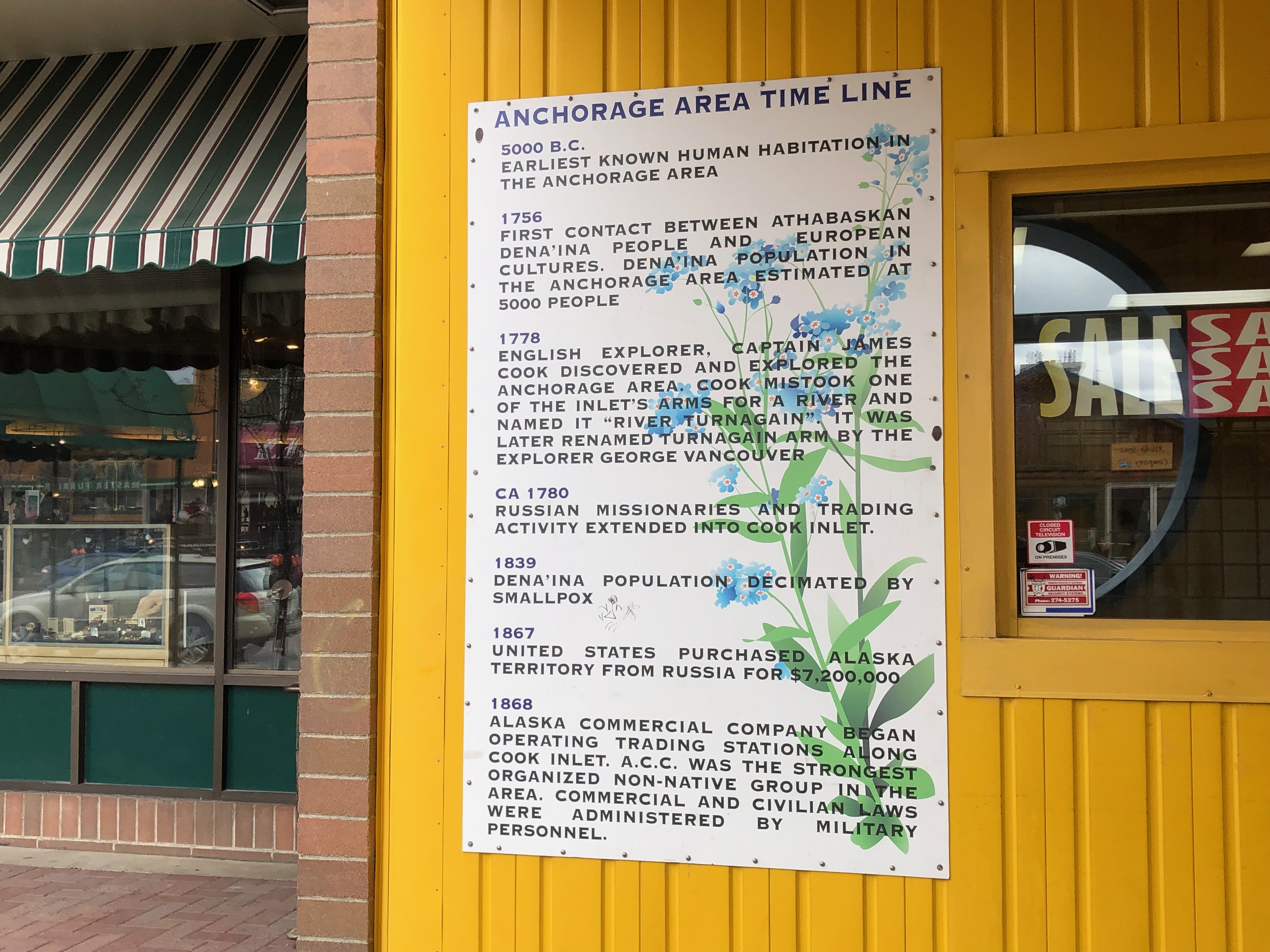
A timeline of Anchorage on display in the city of Anchorage

The following is a timeline of the history of the city of Anchorage, Alaska, United States.

== 20th century ==
- 1914 – Anchorage founded as a railroad construction camp.
- 1915
  - Chamber of Commerce and Anchorage Memorial cemetery established.
  - Alaska Railroad construction begins in Anchorage.
- 1916
  - Anchorage Hotel built.
  - Population: 3,332.
- 1917 – Anchorage Daily Times newspaper begins publication.
- 1920
  - Anchorage incorporated as a town.
  - Leopold David becomes mayor.
  - Population: 1,856.
- 1922 – Anchorage Public Library Association organized.
- 1924 – KFQD radio begins broadcasting.
- 1936
  - City Hall built.
  - Alaska State Fair begins near Anchorage.
- 1939 – Federal Building constructed.
- 1940 – U.S. military Elmendorf Field begins operating near Anchorage.
- 1941 – U.S. Army Fort Richardson built near Anchorage.
- 1943 – Fort Richardson National Cemetery established near Anchorage.
- 1946
  - Alaska News begins publication.
  - Anchorage Symphony Orchestra founded.
- 1947 – Fourth Avenue Theatre opens.
- 1950
  - Anchorage Philatelic Society founded.
  - Population: 35,651 metro.
- 1951
  - Anchorage Airport built.
  - Seward Highway (Seward-Anchorage) completed.
- 1953
  - KENI television begins broadcasting.
  - Anchorage High School opens.
- 1954 – Anchorage Community College established.
- 1955
  - Loussac Public Library opens.
  - Cook Inlet Historical Society founded.
  - U.S. military Kulis Air National Guard Base begins operating.
- 1959 – Anchorage becomes part of the new U.S. state of Alaska.
- 1964
  - January 1: Greater Anchorage Area Borough created.
  - March 27: The 9.2 M_{w} Alaska earthquake affected anchorage with high intensity shaking that caused the control tower at Anchorage International Airport to collapse, and while the tsunamis (that were so destructive elsewhere) did not affect the city, landslides and other extreme ground deformation had significant impact, causing an estimated $116 million in damages ($0.87 billion in 2023 dollars)..
  - Nordic Skiing Association of Anchorage active.
- 1965 – Anchorage Youth Symphony organized.
- 1966 – Alaska Federation of Natives headquartered in Anchorage.
- 1967 – George M. Sullivan becomes mayor.
- 1968
  - Anchorage Museum and Alaska Children's Zoo open.
  - Kincaid Park established.
- 1969 – Sundowner Drive-In cinema opens.
- 1970
  - Chugach State Park established.
  - Population: 48,081.
  - Alyeska Pipeline Service Company headquartered in Anchorage.
- 1971 – University of Alaska Anchorage established.
- 1973 – Don Young becomes U.S. representative for Alaska's at-large congressional district.
- 1975 – Municipality of Anchorage created; Anchorage Assembly established Sullivan continues as municipal mayor.
- 1979 – Food Bank of Alaska established.
- 1980 – Population: 174,431.
- 1982
  - Tony Knowles becomes mayor.
  - Sister city relationship established with Darwin, Australia.
- 1983 – ARCO Tower and Hunt Building constructed.
- 1987
  - 5th Avenue Mall in business.
  - Tom Fink becomes mayor.
- 1988
  - Alaska Aviation Museum opens on Lake Hood.
  - Alaska Center for the Performing Arts opens.
- 1990 – Population: 226,338.
- 1992
  - Mount Spurr volcano erupts.
- 1993 – Alaska Botanical Garden opens.
- 1994
  - Anchorage Press in publication.
  - Rick Mystrom becomes mayor.
- 1995 – Binky (polar bear) dies in the Alaska Zoo.
- 1996 – City website online (approximate date).
- 1997
  - Alaska Native Medical Center established.
  - Alaska Native Tribal Health Consortium headquartered in city.
- 1998 – May: Alaska Natives political demonstration.
- 1999 – Alaska Native Heritage Center opens.
- 2000 – George Wuerch becomes mayor.

== 21st century ==
- 2001 – January: Anchorage paintball attacks.
- 2003 – Mark Begich becomes mayor.
- 2007 – Anchorage Historic Preservation Commission established.
- 2008
  - Alaska Dispatch begins publication.
  - Dena'ina Civic and Convention Center and Linny Pacillo Parking Garage open.
- 2009 – Matt Claman becomes mayor, succeeded by Dan Sullivan.
- 2010
  - Tikahtnu Commons cinema opens.
  - Population: 291,826.
- 2018 – A 7.0 earthquake strikes the city, along with several aftershocks, causing extensive damage.

== See also ==
- History of Anchorage, Alaska
- National Register of Historic Places listings in Anchorage, Alaska
- List of mayors of Anchorage, Alaska

== Bibliography ==
- Federal Writers' Project; Merle Colby (1939). "Anchorage". Alaska: a Guide to the Last American Frontier. American Guide Series. New York: Macmillan. p. 264+.
- Erik R. v. Kuehnelt-Leddihn (1946). "Cities and Towns of Alaska". Geographical Review. 36 (2): 270–290. Bibcode:1946GeoRv..36..270V. doi:10.2307/210880. JSTOR 210880.
- Ralph Browne (1953), Alaska's largest city, Anchorage; an analysis of its growth and future possibilities, 1951–1952, Juneau: Alaska Development Board, archived from the original on March 5, 2016 – via HathiTrust
- William H. Wilson (1967). "Founding of Anchorage: Federal Townbuilding on the Last Frontier". Pacific Northwest Quarterly. 58 (3): 130–141. JSTOR 40441556.
- Ory Mazar Nergal, ed. (1980), "Anchorage", Encyclopedia of American Cities, New York: E.P. Dutton, OL 4120668M
- George Thomas Kurian (1994), "Anchorage, Alaska", World Encyclopedia of Cities, vol. 1: North America, Santa Barbara, Calif.: ABC-CLIO, archived from the original on October 27, 2021 (fulltext via Open Library)
- Patricia H. Partnow (1999). "Ursine Urges and Urban Ungulates: Anchorage Asserts Its Alaskanness". Western Folklore. 58 (1): 33–56. doi:10.2307/1500361. JSTOR 1500361.
- Molly Lee (2003). "'How Will I Sew My Baskets?': Women Vendors, Market Art, and Incipient Political Activism in Anchorage, Alaska". American Indian Quarterly. 27 (3/4): 583–592. doi:10.1353/aiq.2004.0081. JSTOR 4138964. S2CID 154947883.
- "Anchorage, AK". U.S. City Open Data Census. Sunlight Foundation and Open Knowledge International. 2018. Archived from the original on November 18, 2018.
