= List of tallest buildings in Anchorage =

The following table ranks the tallest buildings in Anchorage, Alaska, USA that stand at least 150 feet (46 m) in height. There are currently 16 high-rise buildings in Anchorage meeting this criterion, the tallest being the 22 story, 296 foot (90m) Conoco-Phillips building which has held the title of tallest building in both Anchorage and Alaska since its completion in 1983.

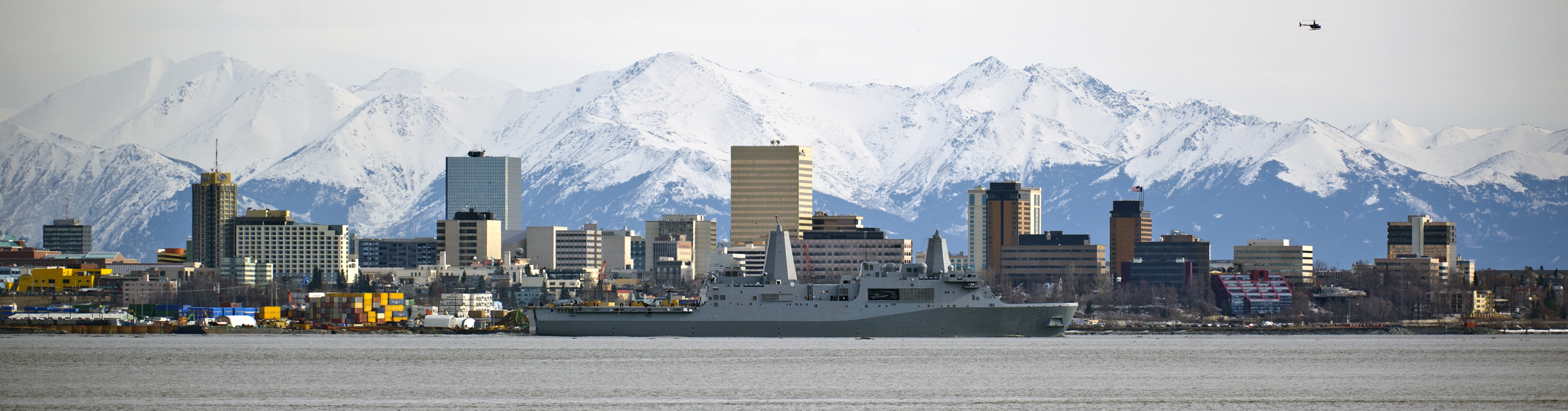
The USS Anchorage leaves its namesake port through Knik Arm in May 2013, days after its commissioning ceremony. The downtown Anchorage skyline and the Chugach Mountains are in the background. Nine of the sixteen buildings listed below are seen in this view. From left: Denali Towers North, Hilton Anchorage East Tower, Hilton Anchorage West Tower, Robert B. Atwood Building, Westmark Anchorage Hotel, Conoco-Phillips Building, Anchorage Marriott, Hotel Captain Cook Tower III and Hotel Captain Cook Tower II. Other buildings seen in this view: Anchorage 5th Avenue Mall, J. C. Penney Store, Linny Pacillo Parking Garage, Old Federal Building, Fourth Avenue Theatre, Alaska Center for the Performing Arts, Nesbett Courthouse, and Boney Courthouse. Bootleggers Cove can be seen at the photo's right edge.

== Tallest buildings ==
Rank	Name	Image	Height ft (m)	Floors	Location	Year	Notes
1	Conoco-Phillips Building	Conoco-Phillips Building Downtown Anchorage, AK	296 (90)	22	700 G Street; 61°12′55″N 149°53′46″W	1983	Previously called the ARCO Tower. Tallest building in Anchorage and the state of Alaska since its completion in 1983.
2	Robert B. Atwood Building	Robert B Atwood Building, Downtown Anchorage, AK	265 (81)	20	550 West Seventh Avenue; 61°12′55″N 149°53′34″W	1983	Previously called the Hunt Building, Enserch Center and Bank of America Center
3	Hilton Anchorage East Tower	Hilton Hotel East tower Downtown Anchorage, AK	243 (74)	21	500 West Third Avenue; 61°13′10″N 149°53′31″W	1971	Historically called the Anchorage Tower, after the original building of the Anchorage Hotel which previously sat on the site. Tallest hotel building in Alaska
4	JL Tower	JL Tower, Midtown Anchorage	226 (69)	14	3800 Centerpoint Drive; 61°11′08″N 149°53′30″W	2008	Tallest building constructed in the 2000s. The JL Tower is topped with a sculptural cap that is illuminated when dark with various light shows and adds approximately 4-5 stories to the building’s structural height.
5	Anchorage Marriott	Marriott Hotel Anchorage, AK	219 (67)	21	820 West Seventh Avenue; 61°12′55″N 149°53′56″W	2000	
6	Denali Towers North	Denali Tower, Midtown Anchorage, AK	217 (66)	16	2550 Denali Street; 61°11′50″N 149°52′39″W	1979	
7	Hotel Captain Cook Tower III	Captain Cook Hotel tower III Anchorage, AK	199 (61)	18	939 West Fifth Avenue; 61°13′04″N 149°54′00″W	1978	
8	Sheraton Anchorage Hotel	Sheraton Anchorage Hotel	194 (59)	16	401 East Sixth Avenue; 61°13′00″N 149°52′37″W	1979	
9	188 Northern Lights	188 Northern Lights Building, Anchorage	190 (58)	15	188 West Northern Lights Boulevard; 61°11′42″N 149°53′10″W	2008	Tallest mixed-use commercial building.
10	BP Exploration Building	BP Building, Midtown Anchorage, Ak	175 (53)	14	900 East Benson Boulevard; 61°11′33″N 149°51′53″W	1985	Originally the Sohio Building until its takeover by BP. This 324,000-square foot, class A office building was built from 1983 to 1985, sits on an 18-acre campus and includes a cafeteria and atrium. The building was phase one of the development which included enough land to be able to accommodate a second tower if the company’s Alaska operations ever required it. In addition, the building was designed to be converted into a hotel when and if the time came for such a transition. In summer of 2019, BP announced that it is ceasing its Alaska Operations.
11	Frontier Building	Frontier building Anchorage, AK	169 (52)	14	3601 C Street; 61°11′16″N 149°53′07″W	1982	Numerous State of Alaska offices moved here from the McKay Building when this building opened.
12	Hotel Captain Cook Tower II	Hotel Captain cook Tower II, Downtown Anchorage, AK	165 (50)	15	939 West Fifth Avenue; 61°13′04″N 149°54′05″W	1972	
13	Westmark Anchorage Hotel	Westmark Hotel, Downtown Anchorage, Ak	157 (48)	14	720 West Fifth Avenue; 61°13′02″N 149°53′47″W	1970	Previously called the Sheffield Hotel, and originally the Royal Inn
14=	Hilton Anchorage West Tower	Hilton Anchorage west tower Anchorage, AK	~150 (46)	14	500 West Third Avenue; 61°13′10″N 149°53′34″W	1963	Historically called the Westward Tower, as it was originally constructed as a major addition to the Westward Hotel. A major addition to this tower of similar height was constructed in the 1980s, covering the site of the original Westward Hotel and its previous additions.
14=	McKinley Tower Apartments	McKinley Tower Apartments, Anchorage, AK	~150 (46)	14	338 Denali Street (also 337 East Fourth Avenue); 61°13′08″N 149°52′39″W	1952	Historically called the Mt. McKinley Building and the McKay Building, it is the tallest residential building in Anchorage. It is nearly identical to the Inlet Tower Hotel in its architectural and construction details.
14=	Inlet View Tower	Inlet Tower, Anchorage, AK	~150 (46)	14	1200 L Street; 61°12′37″N 149°54′08″W	1951	Historically called the 1200 L Apartment Building. Nearly identical to the McKinley/McKay Building in its architectural and construction details. Currently a hotel.

== Tallest under construction, proposed or cancelled ==
Rank	Name	Image	Height ft (m)	Floors	Location	Status	Notes
1	Peach Tower		Unknown	28	605 West Fifth Avenue	Cancelled	Was to include a hotel, residences and multilevel parking.
2	Augustine Energy Center		Unknown	21	Corner of Sixth Ave and G Street	Cancelled	Design included 14 stories of Class A office space over 7 stories of parking. Completion was planned for 2010.
3	Crystal Plaza		Unknown	16	Corner of 9th Ave and F street	Cancelled	Was to include 40 high-end living units with street level retail.
