= Binky (polar bear) =

Polar bear who lived at the Alaska Zoo

- Binky with a tourist's shoe in his mouth
- Species: Polar bear
- Sex: Male
- Born: 1975; Cape Beaufort on Alaska's North Slope
- Died: July 20, 1995 (aged 19–20); Anchorage, Alaska, U.S.

Binky (1975 – July 20, 1995) was a captive male polar bear who lived at the Alaska Zoo in Anchorage. In separate incidents in 1994, Binky mauled two zoo visitors; these events received international news coverage.

He was originally orphaned near Cape Beaufort, close to the Chukchi Sea in the Alaska North Slope, and was found in Northwest Alaska by David Bergsrud. Alaska Fish and Game was contacted shortly after Binky's discovery, and arrangements were made to find a zoo in the contiguous United States. Anchorage had a small zoo at the time, with an elephant that local grocer Jack Snyder had won in a contest along with a few other donated animals.

Time was needed to find a sponsor to fund an enclosure for Binky at the Alaska Children's Zoo. Alaska Fish and Game employees came up with the idea of flying Binky to a number of the inland North Slope villages. Schools were let out in these villages so that the local children could come to the airstrip to see Binky. These events received major news coverage. The Anchorage Zoo was eventually able to take Binky, who quickly became one of its most popular attractions, as well as a local hero. Binky died in 1995 from sarcocystis, a parasitic disease.

== Early life ==
Binky was found orphaned near Cape Beaufort, on Alaska's North Slope, in late April 1975 by an oilfield worker. Efforts were made to locate his mother, to no avail. By early May 1975, the Alaska Department of Fish and Game (ADF&G) was contacted and began arrangements to find a zoo in the United States outside of Alaska to take Binky. Word eventually got around that a polar bear cub had been found, and communities near Nome as well as people in Anchorage petitioned ADF&G to let Binky stay in Alaska. Anchorage had a small zoo at the time (now known as the Alaska Zoo) with an elephant that one of the founders had won and a few other donated animals. ADF&G found ways to stall sending Binky outside of Alaska. While waiting to find a "sponsor" to fund an enclosure for Binky at the Alaska Children's Zoo, ADF&G employees came up with the idea of flying Binky to a number of the inland North Slope villages. School was let out in these villages so that the children could come to the airstrips to see Binky. These visits received major news coverage. Finally things fell into place, and ADF&G allowed Binky to move to the Alaska Children's Zoo (later the Alaska Zoo) in Anchorage, where he quickly became one of the zoo's most popular attractions. His keeper commented in 1976 that Binky was a performer and cried in the evenings when his applauding, laughing visitors left for the day.

Binky was initially placed in a 13-by-20-foot (4.0 by 6.1 m) oval cage, which he quickly outgrew. The prospect of raising the estimated US$150,000 (equivalent to $897,500 in 2025) needed for a new, larger enclosure was uncertain, and zoo officials feared Binky would have to be sent to the Milwaukee Zoo. A fundraiser and open house were held to raise money for the effort, and a number of schools and businesses participated. Ultimately, the greatest contribution to the zoo's effort was the city's purchase of the zoo land for $100,000, which the zoo agreed to buy back in 55 annual installments of $2,500. Binky's new enclosure opened in May 1977.

As Binky approached sexual maturity, zoo officials negotiated for the purchase of a female polar bear named Mimi from the Tulsa Zoo in Oklahoma. As the transfer was being finalized, however, Mimi died from a viral disease in Tulsa. In February 1979, young polar bear twins (Nuka, a female, and Siku, a male) joined Binky in his enclosure. Binky got along poorly with Siku, however, so Siku was given to a zoo in Morelia, Mexico, in 1981.

As a full-grown bear, Binky weighed 1,200 pounds. He was an aggressive bear; in 1980, he bit off a zoo employee's finger. His keeper commented in 1983, "Binky is stubborn [and] independent, and he likes to play games. When he's really feeling obstinate, he walks halfway into his den and sits down. He knows I can't close it. He's a very smart bear."

== Maulings, celebrity, and death ==
On July 29, 1994, 29-year-old Australian tourist Kathryn Warburton jumped over two safety rails to get a close-up photograph of Binky in his enclosure. When Binky stuck his head through the bars and grabbed her, she suffered a broken leg and bite wounds. Another tourist caught the event on tape. Binky kept the woman's shoe for three days before it could be retrieved by zoo officials, and the day after the attack, Alaska Star photographer Rob Layman took a photo of Binky holding the shoe in his mouth, an image which was printed in almost every press account of the incident. Warburton gave her other shoe to the Bird House, a bar in nearby Bird Creek that burned down in 1996.

Six weeks later, on September 11, Binky was involved in another mauling. Two drunken local teenagers approached the bear's enclosure, and 19-year-old Joshua Huyett was hospitalized with leg lacerations after he was mauled. The zoo did not confirm that Binky was the attacker, but the bear had blood on his face following the incident. Huyett later pled no contest to trespassing and underage drinking, receiving a sentence of community service. Huyett also disputed claims that he had intended to swim in the enclosure's pool, explaining that he had shed his pants to slip from the bear's grasp.

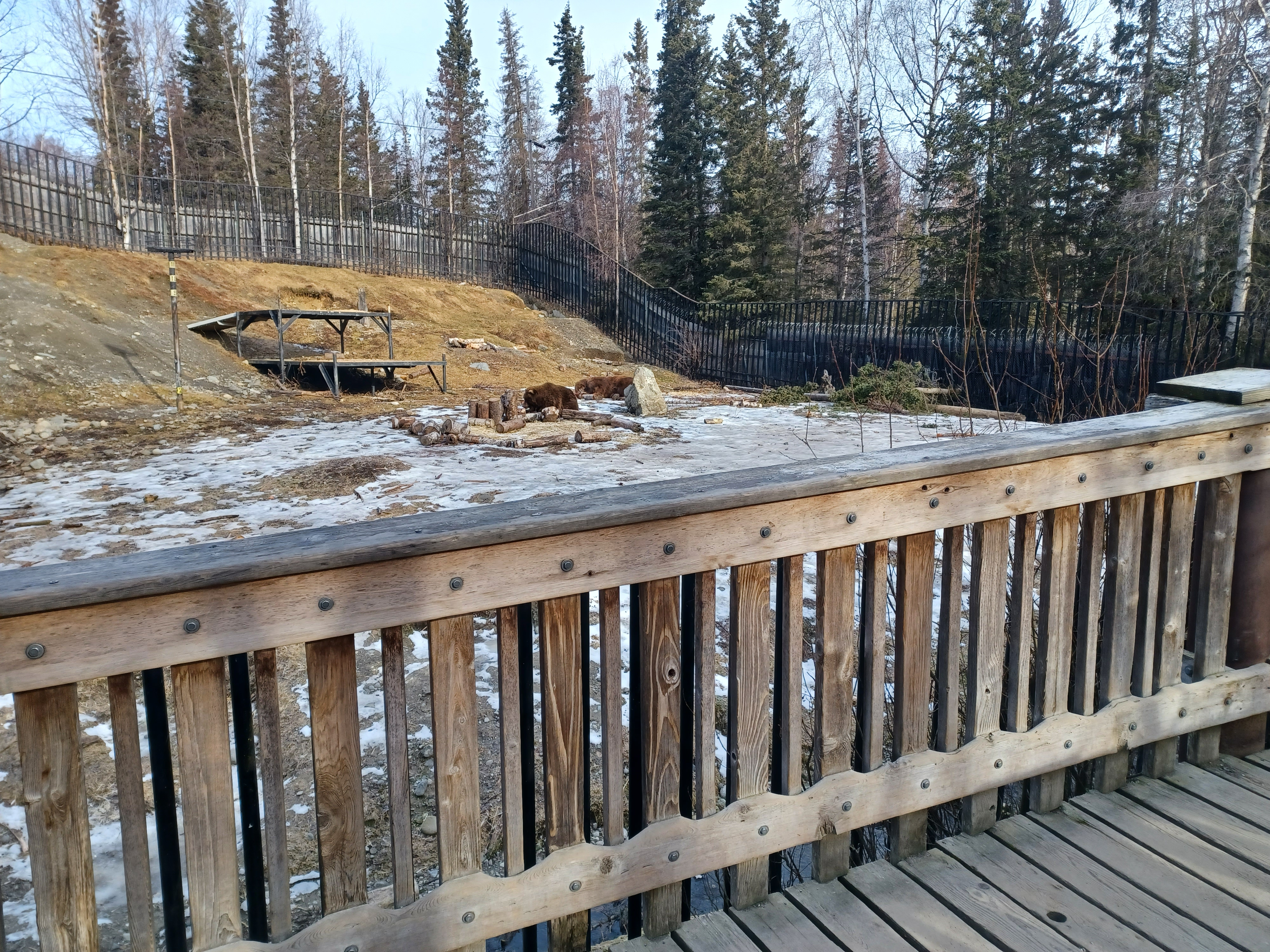
Binky's former enclosure had an elevated walkway and viewing deck added after the maulings and now houses brown bears.

After these attacks, Binky received international news coverage. Binky merchandise was created, including T-shirts, mugs, and bumper stickers, often adorned with the shoe photo or with the slogan "Send another tourist, this one got away". Local letters to the editor supported Binky during both incidents, most often arguing that the inherently dangerous nature of polar bears should be respected. The zoo's director, Sammye Seawell, criticized Warburton's actions in the Anchorage Daily News, saying "[s]he violated the rules and jeopardized the bear's life." Though Seawell initially insisted that the attack would not change how the zoo was run, security around Binky's cage was upgraded to keep zoo visitors out.

In 1995, Binky's cagemate Nuka suddenly became sick with the parasitic disease sarcocystis, dying from associated liver failure on July 14, a week after her symptoms began. Shortly thereafter, Binky showed signs of the disease. On the morning of July 20, he went into convulsions and died. Zoo visitors left bouquets of flowers outside the bears' empty enclosure, and the zoo's memorial service saw a high turnout despite pouring rain. The bears were buried on zoo grounds.

== See also ==
- Bear danger
- Bear attack
- List of individual bears
