= Alaska Zoo =

Zoo in Anchorage, Alaska, United States

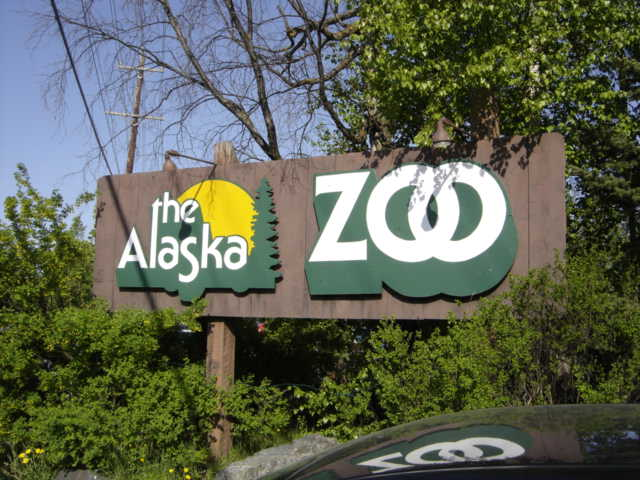
- Interactive map of Alaska Zoo
- 61.124799°N 149.792131°W
- Date opened: 1969
- Location: 4731 O'Malley Road, Anchorage, Alaska, 99507, United States
- Land area: 25 acres (10 ha)
- No. of animals: 100
- No. of species: 35 (as of 2006)
- Annual visitors: 200,000
- Website: alaskazoo.org

The Alaska Zoo is a zoo in Anchorage, Alaska, located on 25 acres (10 ha) of the Anchorage Hillside. It is a popular attraction in Alaska, with nearly 200,000 visitors per year.

The zoo is currently home to more than 100 birds and mammals representing some 50 species. The zoo has the widest variety of animals native to the state of Alaska as well as some exotics such as Amur tigers, Bactrian camels, and yaks.

In addition to viewing, the zoo specializes in education, research, wildlife conservation, and animal rehabilitation; many of the animals currently in the zoo were found orphaned or injured.

== History ==
In 1966, Anchorage grocer Jack Snyder won a contest offering a prize of "$3,000 or a baby elephant". He chose the elephant, a female Asian elephant named Annabelle. Annabelle was initially kept at the Diamond H Horse Ranch, located in the Hillside area of Anchorage and owned by Sammye Seawell, which had the only heated stalls available.

With Annabelle's increasing popularity, Seawell formed a non-profit corporation to build a place "where the public could visit animals and learn about them." It was incorporated on March 28, 1968, as the Alaska Children's Zoo, which opened in 1969 with Annabelle and other donated animals. The zoo was located on land adjacent to Seawell's ranch. The zoo's name was changed to Alaska Zoo in June 1980.

In 1983, a female African elephant named Maggie arrived at the Alaska Zoo as a companion for Annabelle.

The zoo attracted some attention, even outside Alaska, in 1994 when Binky, then one of the zoo's polar bears, injured several visitors who entered his enclosure, famously pacing with an Australian woman's shoe dangling from his mouth (the current polar bear exhibit is human-proof).

In 1997, Annabelle died, leaving her companion, Maggie alone. In 2004, in spite of mounting criticism, Alaska Zoo officials decided to keep Maggie in Alaska for at least three more years, rather than sending her to an elephant sanctuary in a warmer climate, where she could also socialize with other elephants. As of June 6, 2007, she was moved to the PAWS sanctuary in California.

== Notable animals ==
=== Annabelle (1964–1997), an Asian elephant ===
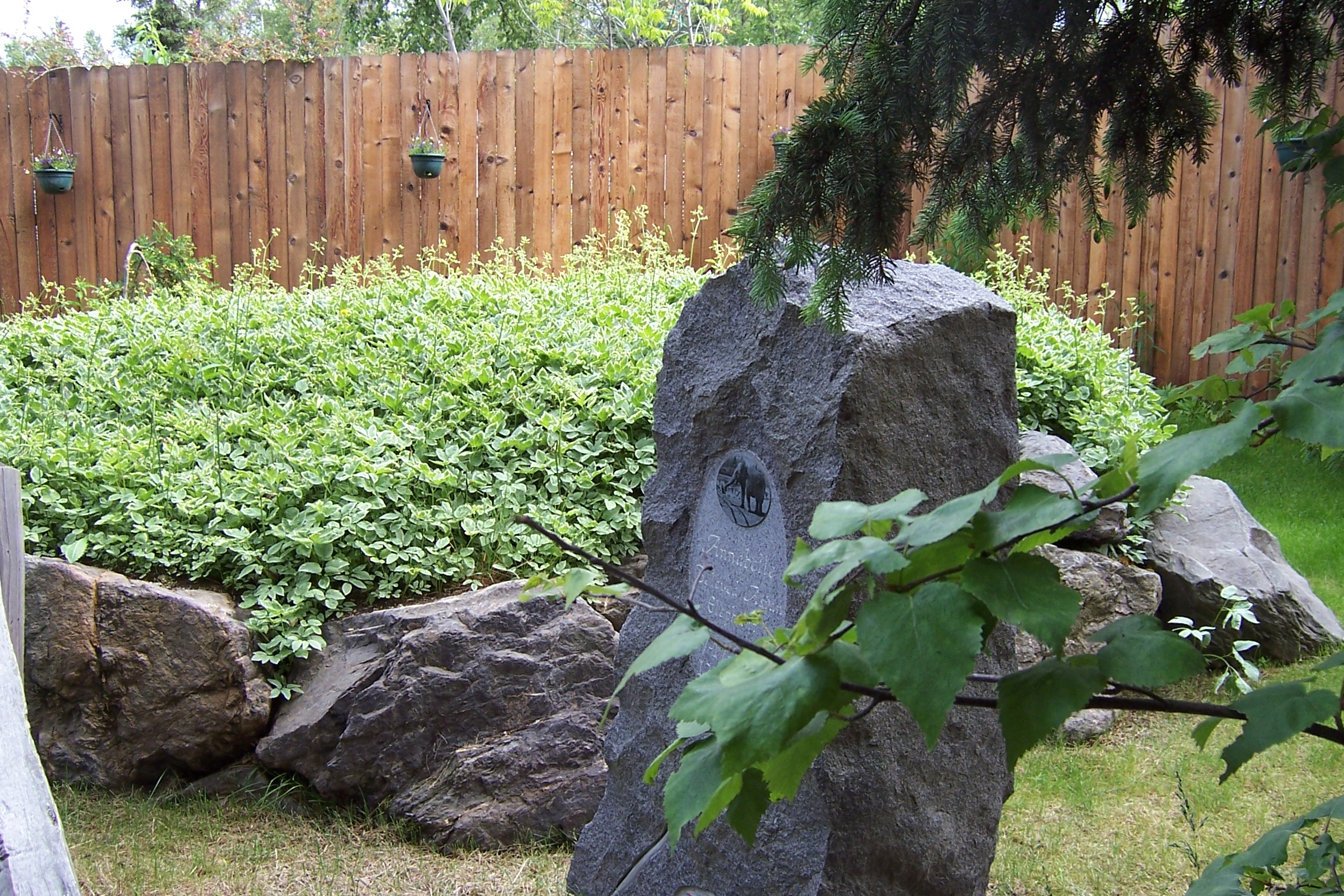
Annabelle's grave, Alaska Zoo

Annabelle, an Asian elephant, was born in India in 1964. In 1966, in a Chiffon Tissue contest sponsored by Crown Zellerbach, she was offered as an alternative prize between "$3,000 or a baby elephant". The prize-winner, Anchorage grocer Jack Snyder, chose the elephant. Annabelle was initially kept at the Diamond H Horse Ranch, located in the Hillside area of Anchorage and owned by Sammye Seawell, which had the only heated stalls available. Annabelle was one of the first animals when the zoo was founded as the Alaska Children's Zoo in 1969, along with several orphaned and injured animals in need of homes, including a black bear, seal, Arctic fox, and petting zoo goats.

Annabelle died of complications of a foot infection on December 15, 1997.

=== Binky (1975–1995), a polar bear ===
Binky (1975 – July 20, 1995) was a captive male polar bear. In separate incidents in 1994, Binky mauled two zoo visitors; these events received international news coverage.

He was originally orphaned near Cape Beaufort, close to the Chukchi Sea in the Alaska North Slope, and was found in Northwest Alaska by David Bergsrud. Alaska Fish and Game was contacted shortly after Binky's discovery, and arrangements were made to find a zoo in the contiguous United States. Anchorage had a small zoo at the time, with an elephant that local grocer Jack Snyder had won in a contest along with a few other donated animals.

Time was needed to find a sponsor to fund an enclosure for Binky at the Alaska Children's Zoo. Alaska Fish and Game employees came up with the idea of flying Binky to a number of the inland North Slope villages. Schools were let out in these villages so that the local children could come to the airstrip to see Binky. These events received major news coverage. The Anchorage Zoo was eventually able to take Binky, who quickly became one of its most popular attractions, as well as a local hero. Binky died in 1995 from sarcocystis, a parasitic disease.

=== Maggie (1983–2021), an African elephant ===
Maggie, an African elephant, came to the Alaska Zoo in 1983 as a companion for Annabelle. Maggie originated in Zimbabwe, Africa, where her herd had been culled – selectively destroyed to reduce numbers – leaving her in need of a home. Maggie is also known as having the first elephant treadmill in the world.

In 2007, Maggie was moved to the PAWS sanctuary in California, by game show host and animal rights activist Bob Barker. She died in August of 2021.

=== Grubby, an opossum ===
Grubby was an opossum that traveled from somewhere in Washington State to Homer, Alaska in a shipping container and eluded authorities for over a month, delivering a litter of joeys in the process. Opossums are considered an invasive species in Alaska. In May 2023, a Homer police officer did manage to trap Grubby, and due to the public interest in the matter, she was handed over to the Alaska Zoo to reside in their invasive species collection instead of being euthanized.

== Current species ==
A highlight of the species at the zoo include:

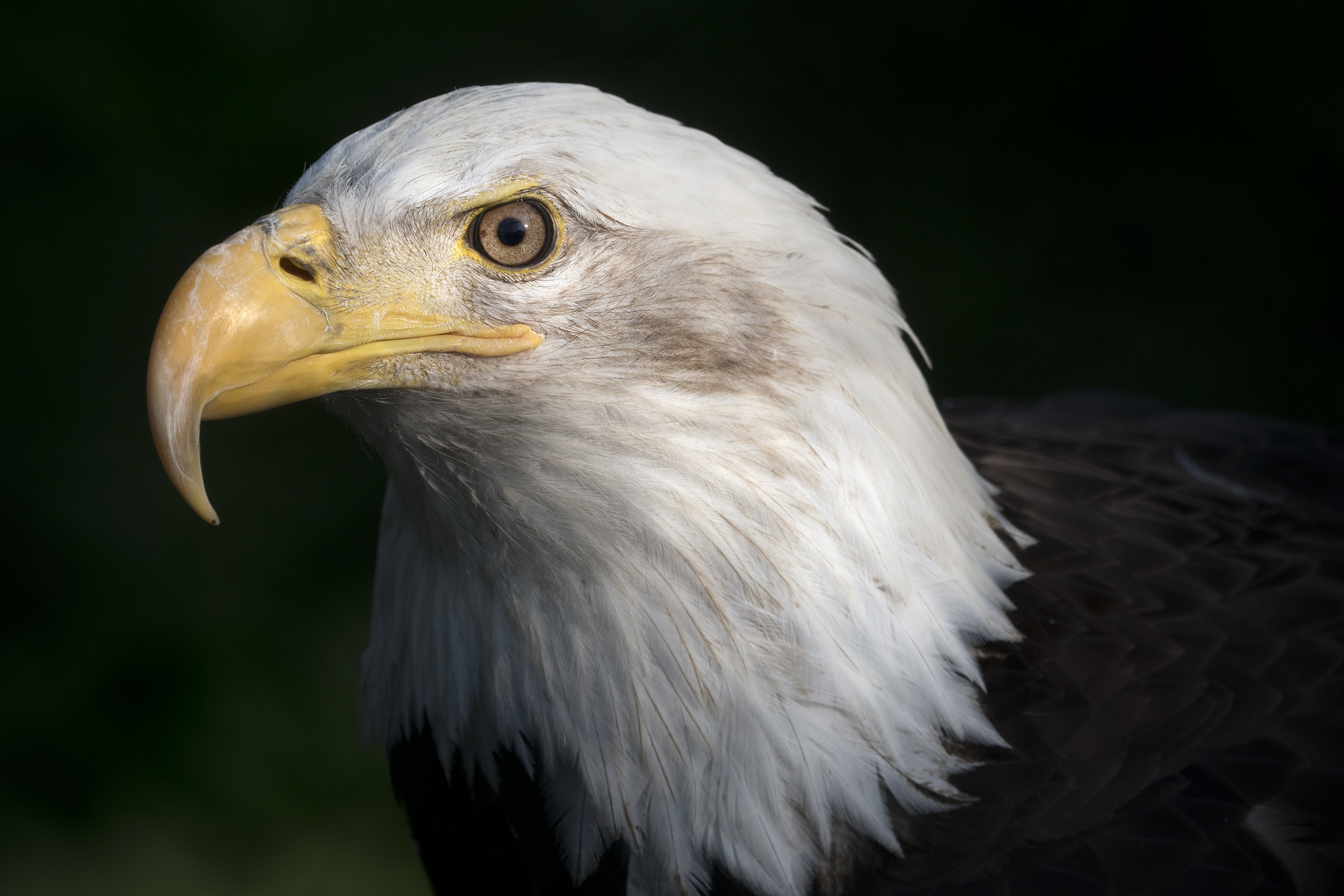
Bald eagle at the zoo

- Brown bear
- American black bear
- Polar bear
- Dall sheep
- Mountain goat
- North American porcupine
- Flying squirrel
- Wolverine
- North American river otter
- Siberian tiger
- Snow leopard
- Canada lynx
- Bald eagle
- Golden eagle
- Bactrian camel
- Alpaca
- Common raven
- Trumpeter swan
- Red-tailed hawk
- Sharp-shinned hawk
- Moose
- Reindeer
- Sitka deer
- Great grey owl
- Great horned owl
- Short-eared owl
- Peale's falcon
- Domestic yak
- Muskox
- Harbor seal
- Gray wolf
- Coyote
- Red fox

== Conservation efforts ==
The Alaska Zoo is proactive in its conservation efforts and research, as well as education programs. The zoo is a part of the Species Survival Program for tigers and snow leopards, and the Polar Bear International helping with the conservation of polar bears. Also, the zoo is involved in animal husbandry and research on a variety of scales in part with the University of Alaska Anchorage.

== Gallery ==
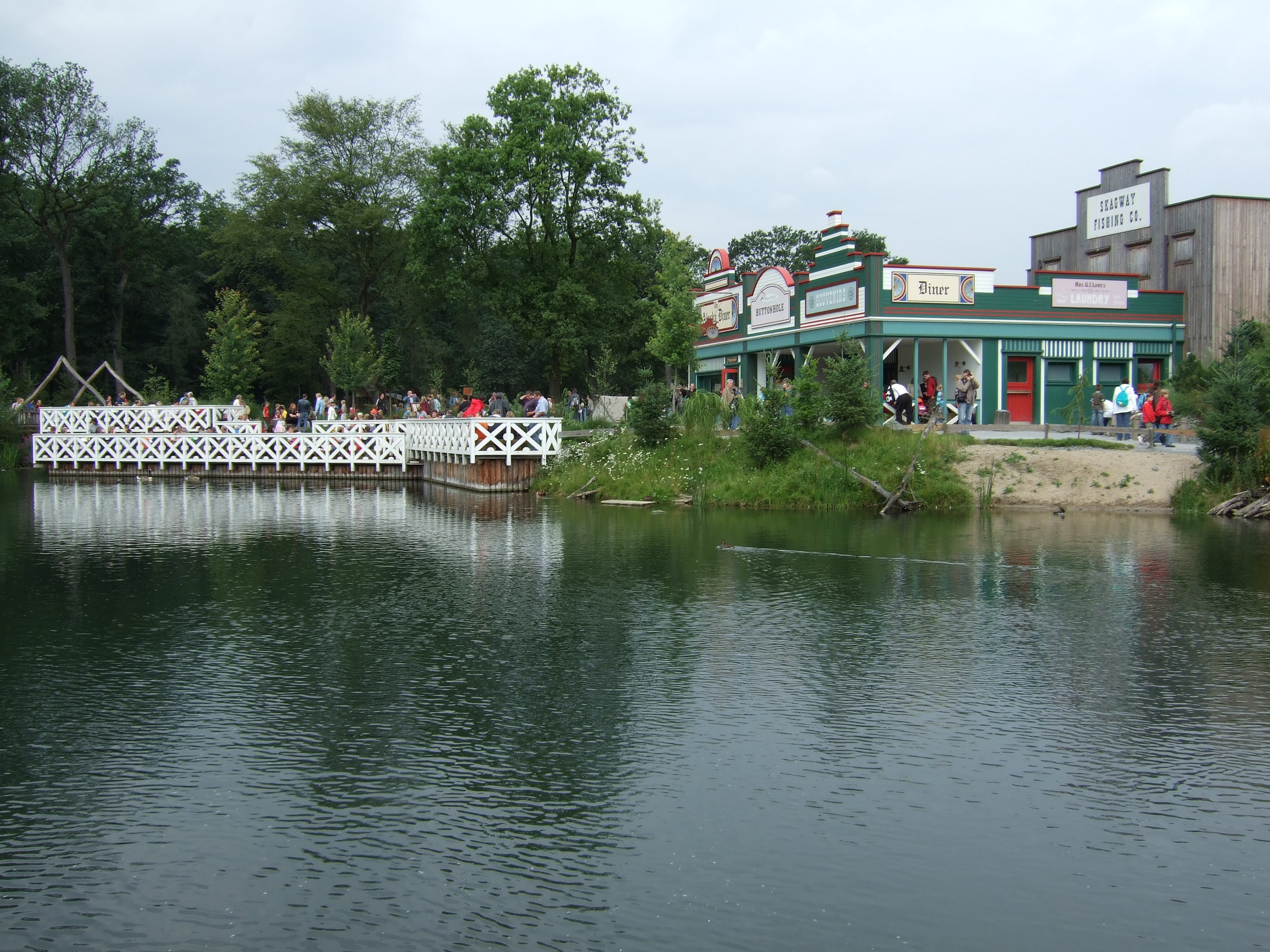
Restaurant at the zoo

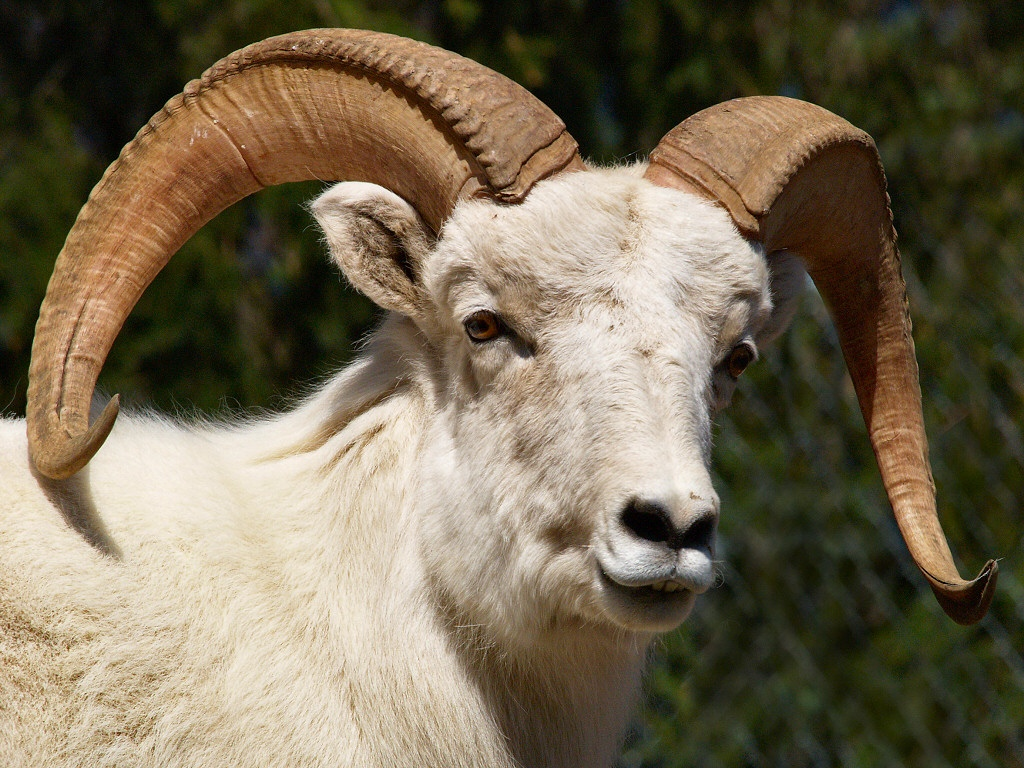
Dall Sheep (Ovis dalli)

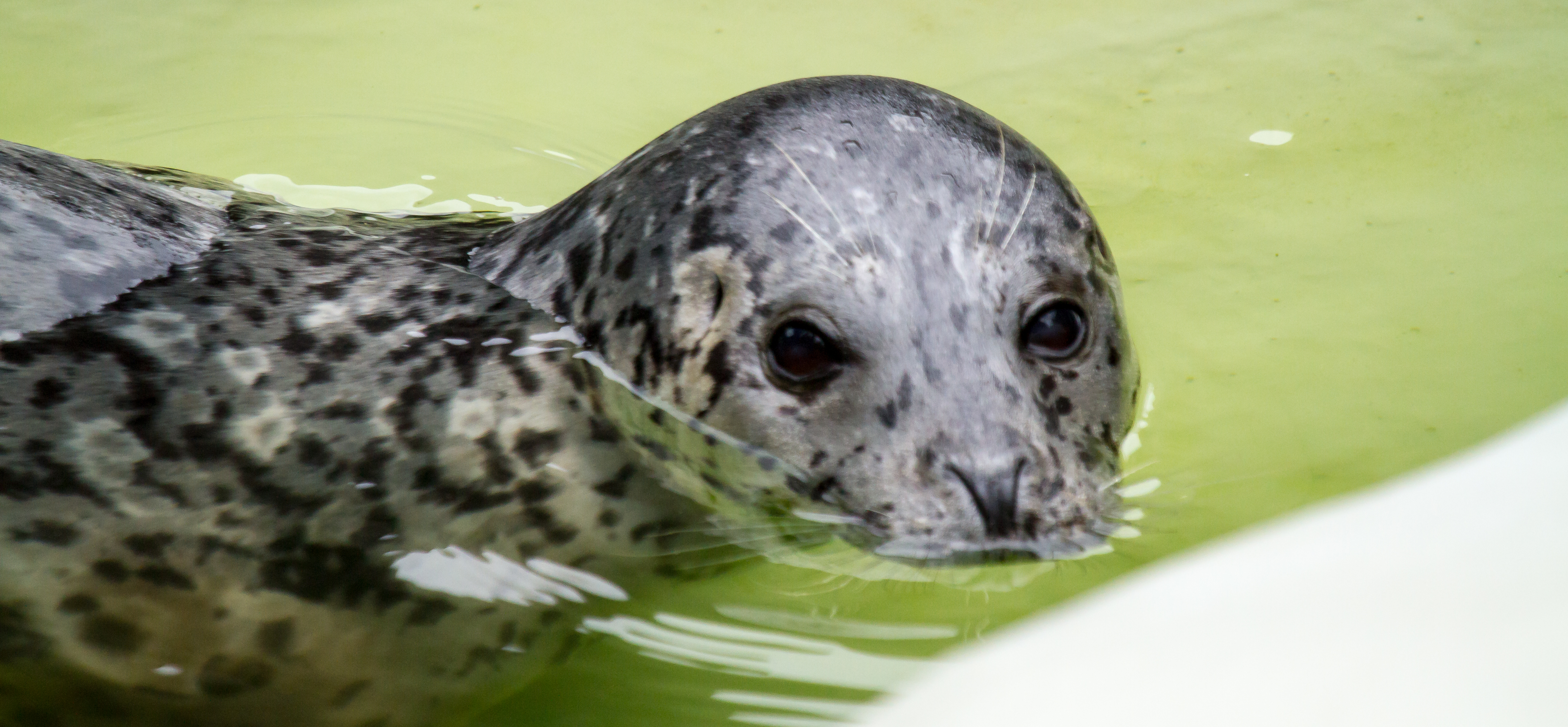
Harbor seal (Phoca vitulina)

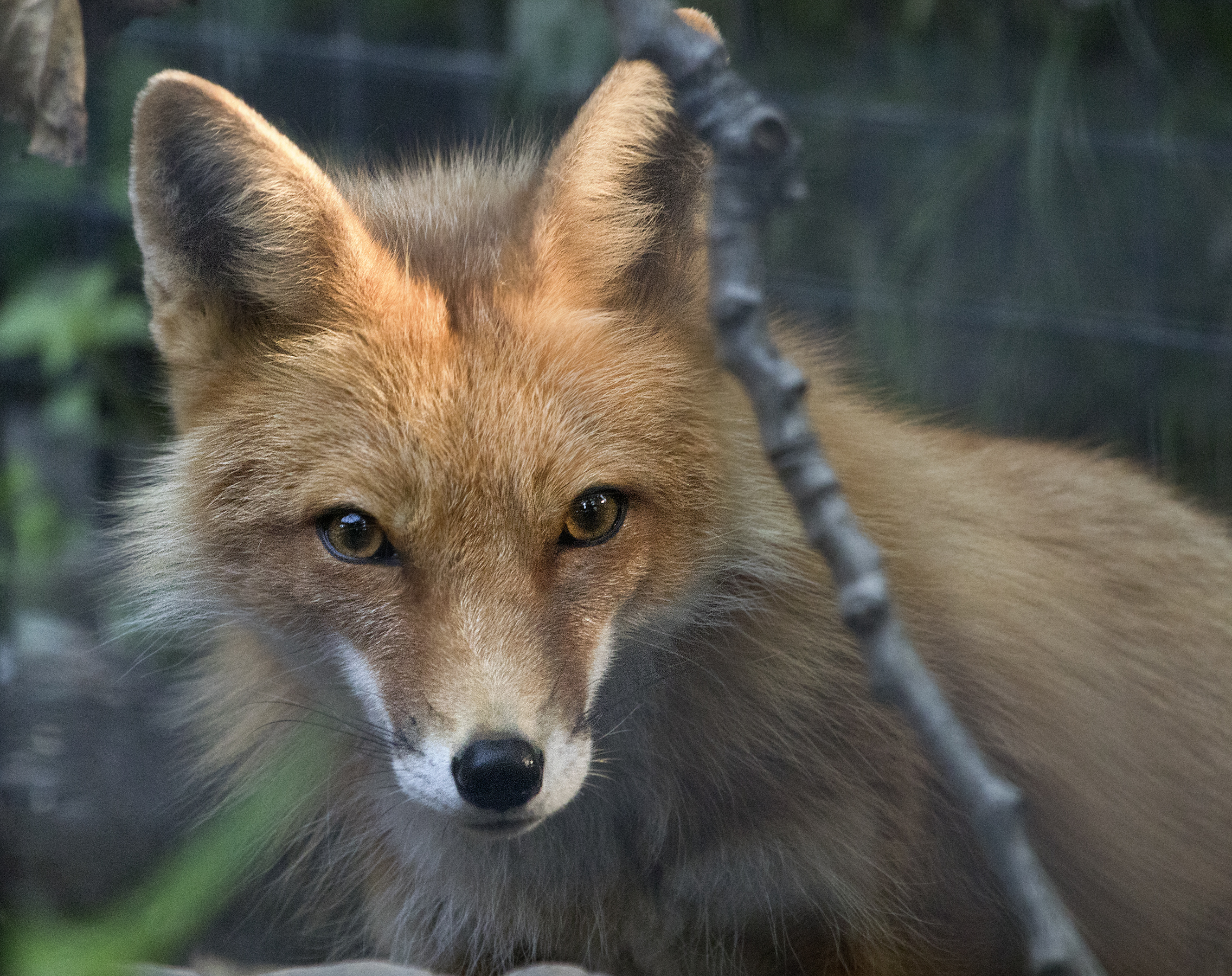
Red fox

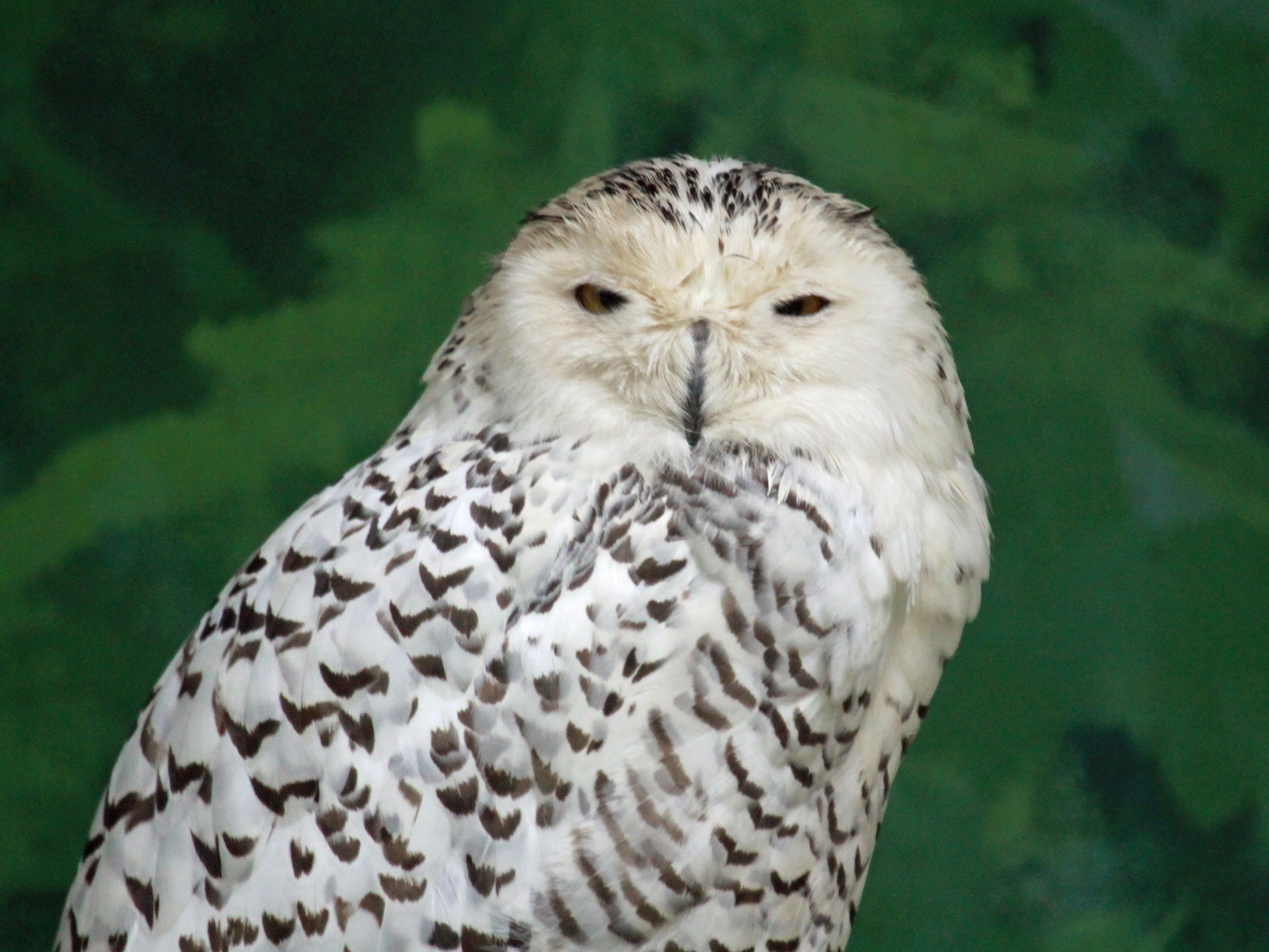
Snowy owl (Bubo scandiacus)

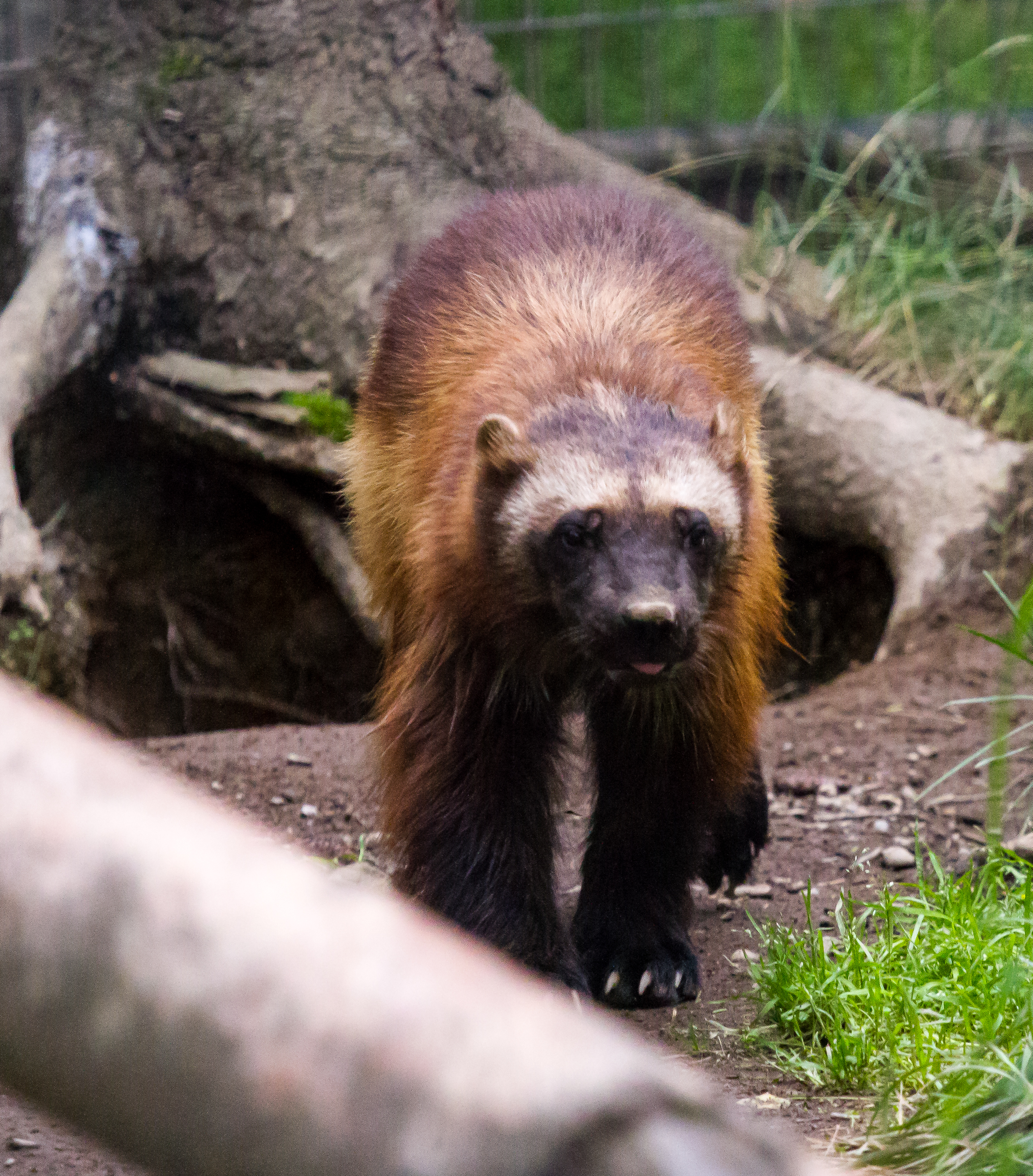
Wolverine at the zoo

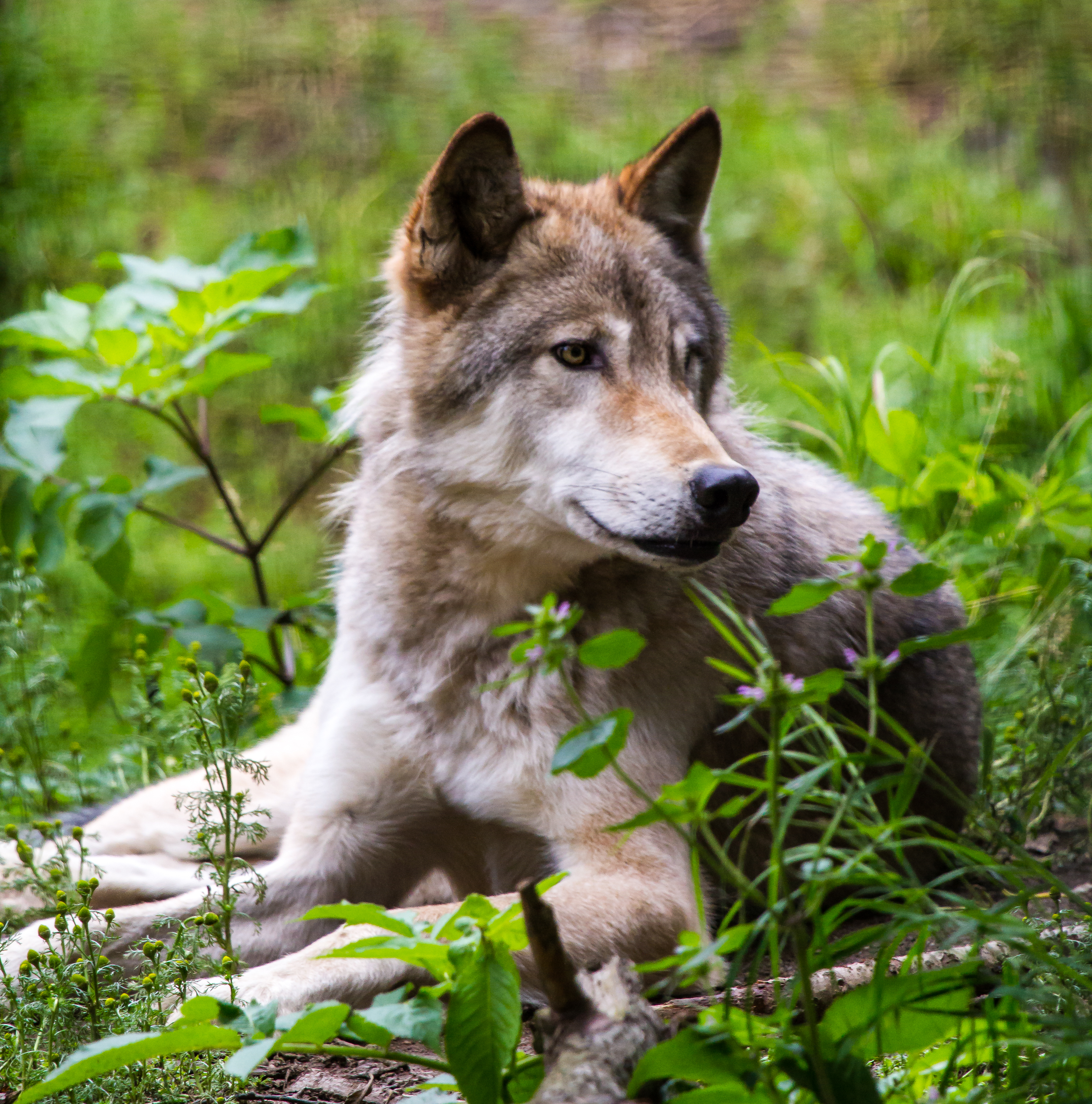
Wolf at rest

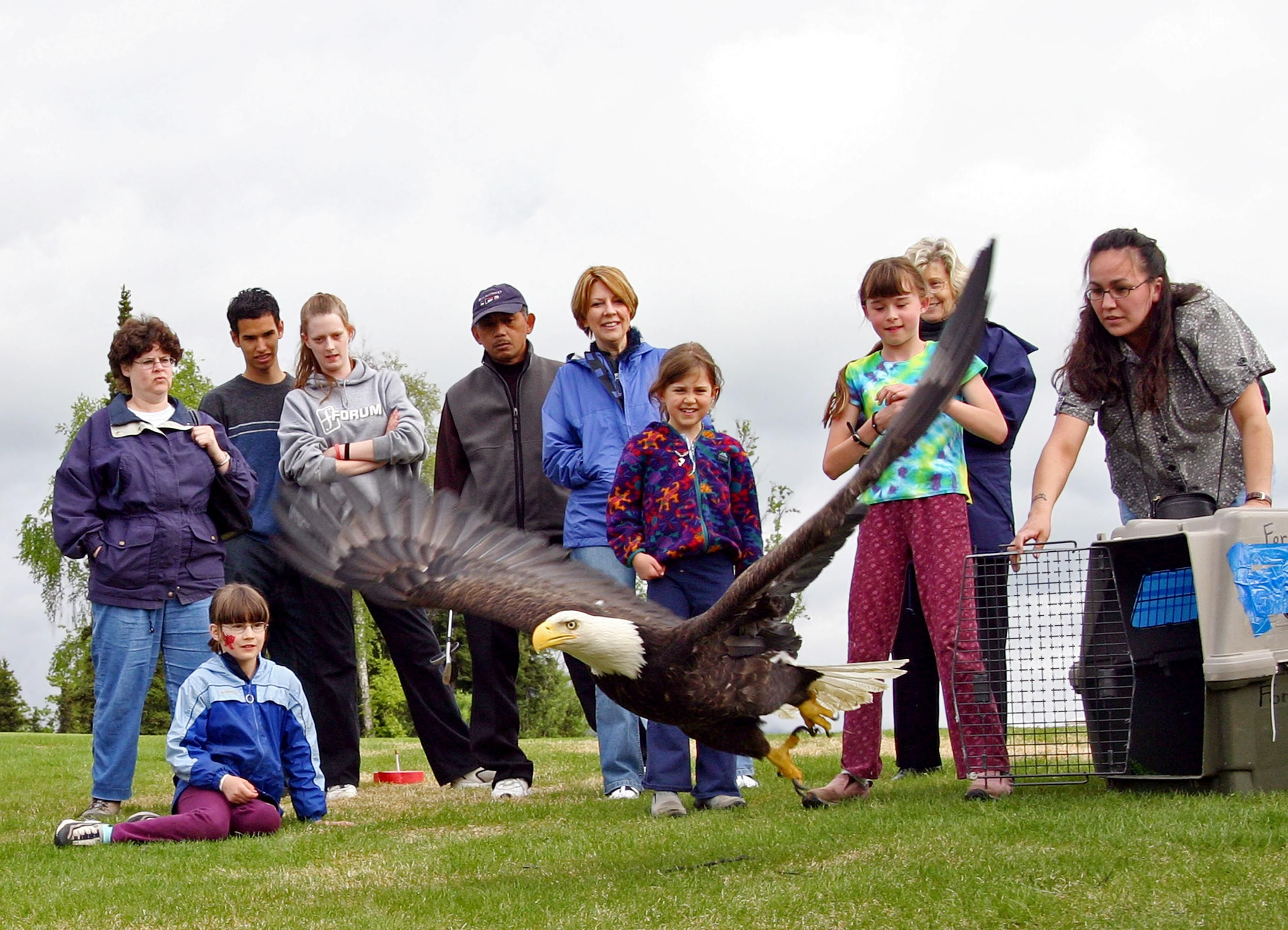
Eagle release part of a Migratory Bird Day event

== See also ==
- Wildlife of Alaska
- Mammals of Alaska
