= Robert B. Atwood Building =

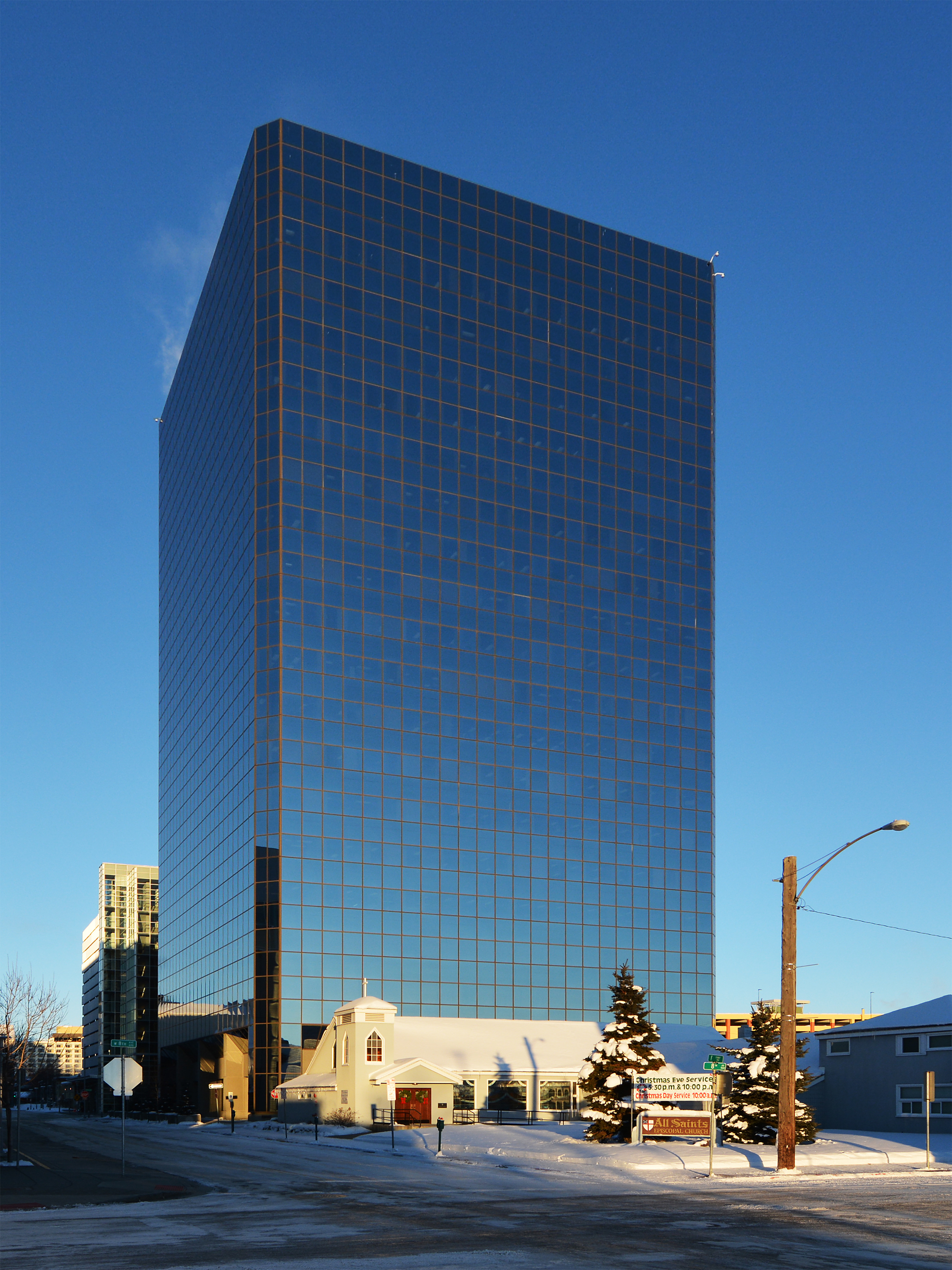
- Robert B. Atwood Building in 2013

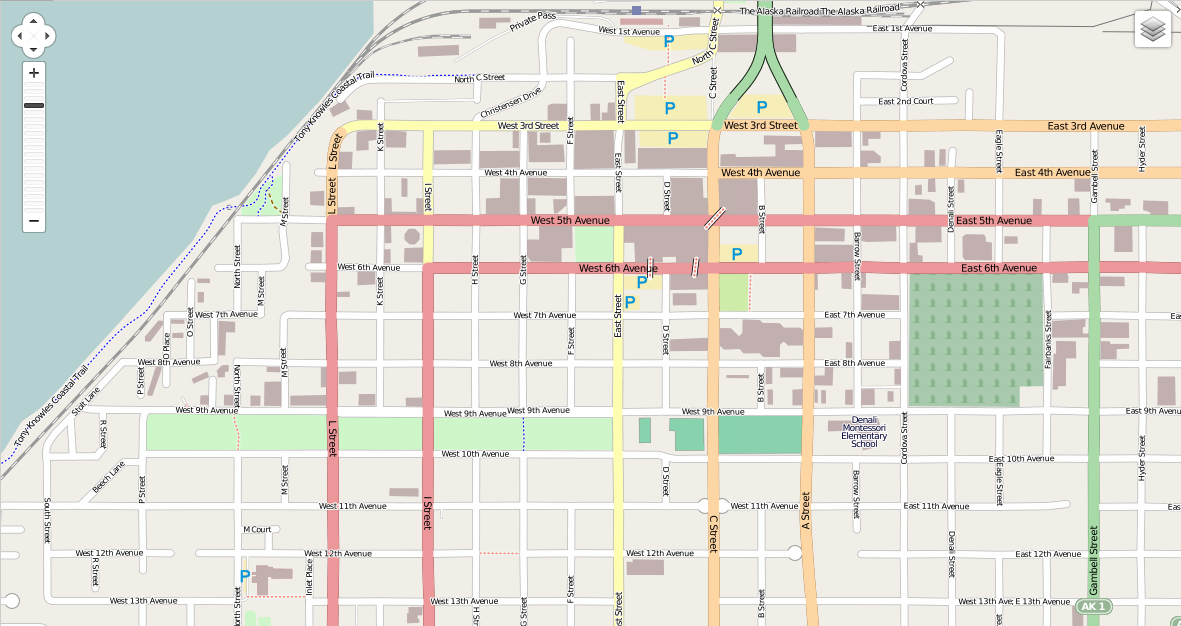
- Location within Downtown Anchorage Location within Alaska
- Alternative names: Bank of America Center

General information
- Type: Commercial offices
- Location: 550 W 7th Ave, Anchorage, Alaska
- Coordinates: 61.215278°N 149.892778°W
- Construction started: 1982
- Completed: 1983
- Opening: March 17, 1983

Height
- Roof: 265 ft (81 m)

Technical details
- Floor area: 374,186 sq ft (34,763.0 m^{2})

Design and construction
- Architects: Harold Wirum & Associates
- Main contractor: Lease Kissee Construction Company; Anchorage, Alaska

The Robert B. Atwood Building is a 265-foot (81 m), 20 story office building located in Downtown Anchorage, Alaska, and is the second-tallest building in Alaska. The building houses government offices for the State of Alaska. Originally intended to be taller, it was limited in height by the FAA due to its proximity to Merril Field Airport. The building was formerly known as the Bank of America Center. Together with the slightly taller Conoco-Phillips Building, this high-rise helps define the Anchorage skyline.

== Facilities ==
A landscaped plaza is featured on the building's east side. The single-story basement is used as a parking level. There are nine elevators in the building. Amenities include teleconferencing-enabled conference rooms, vending and break rooms, and a central mail room.

=== Parking garage ===
The State of Alaska completed a new parking garage in 2008 across the street from the Robert B. Atwood Building. The garage is named the Linny Pacillo Parking Garage after local parking activist Carolyn 'Linny' Pacillo who, with her sister, Susan, became famous during the 1990s for wearing tutus and plugging parking meters downtown in protest to strict parking enforcement. The sisters were dubbed the Parking Fairies. Linny Pacillo died in 2006.

== Involvement in seismic research ==
In 2003, the United States Geological Survey (USGS) installed a network of accelerometers throughout the building to monitor the effects of earthquakes on tall buildings. The Atwood Building was selected due to the unique properties of the "Bootlegger Cove Formation" soil it stands on, and the historical seismicity of the region (see Good Friday earthquake.) The mission of the research is to better understand the effects of seismicity on similar buildings to better prepare them for future large earthquakes.

The USGS has since published a video created by S. Farid Ghahari, Mehmet Çelebi, and Ertugrul Taciroglu, which shows movement of the Atwood building during a M7 event in January, 2016.

== History ==
The architect for the Atwood building was Harold Wirum & Associates. The building officially opened for business on March 17, 1983, with 15% of the office space occupied. The building had been scheduled to open April 1, but a man by the name Fred McCallister convinced ownership to open on St. Patrick's Day. Opening night the top floor was used for a St. Patrick's Day celebration. The building was developed by NB Hunt Trust Estate. In the late 1980s they filed for bankruptcy after suffering significant losses from the Silver Thursday debacle. In September 1988 ownership of the building was transferred to Equitable Life Assurance, who in 1997 sold their interest in the building to the State of Alaska for $27 million.

== Namesake ==
The building was originally named after the original owner Nelson Bunker Hunt as the Hunt Building. It was renamed the Enserch Center in September 1985 and later renamed again as the Bank of America Center. Most recently it was named after Robert Bruce Atwood, an Alaska statehood activist and Anchorage Times editor and publisher.

== See also ==
- Conoco-Phillips Building
- List of tallest buildings in Anchorage
- Nelson Bunker Hunt
