= Conoco-Phillips Building =

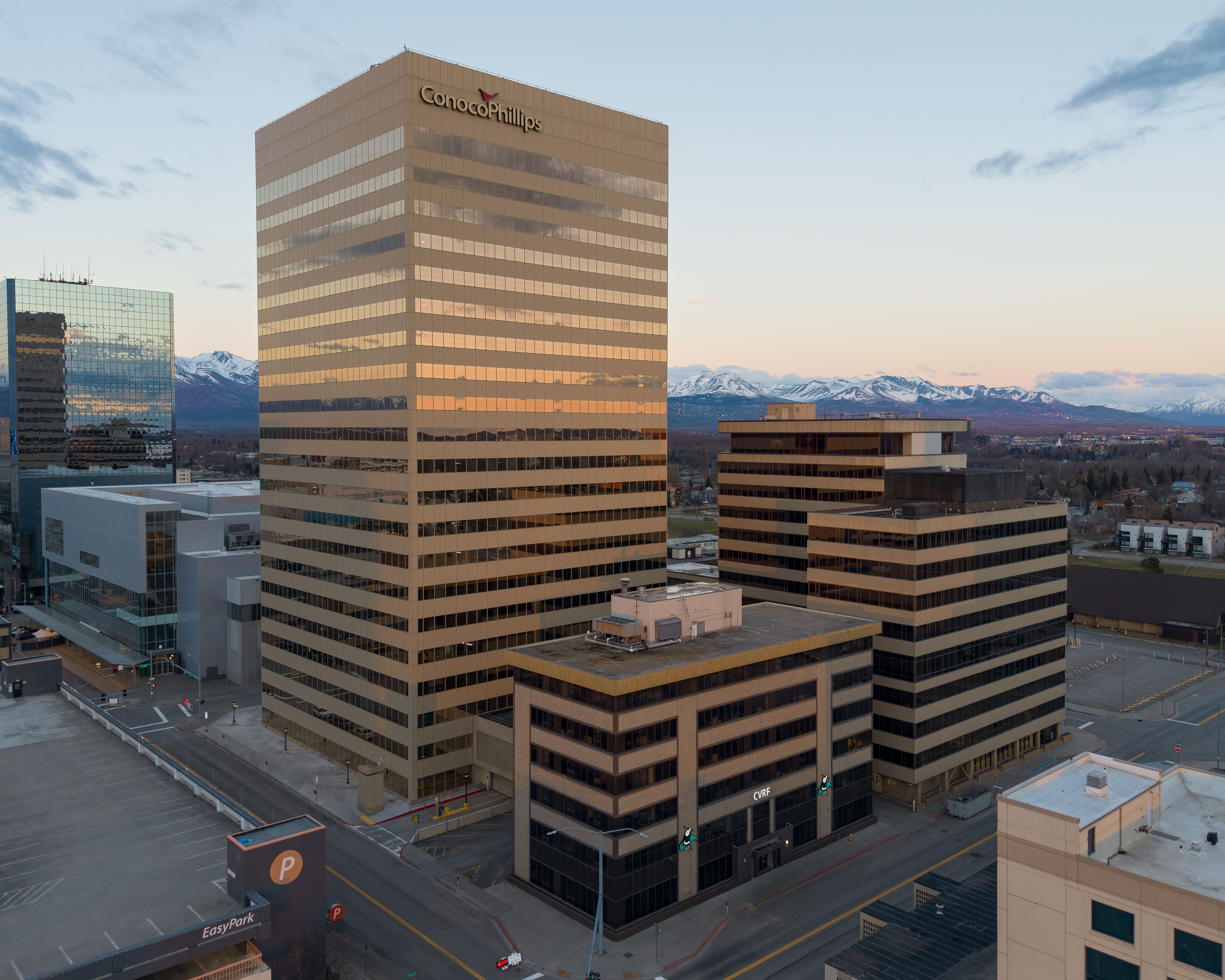

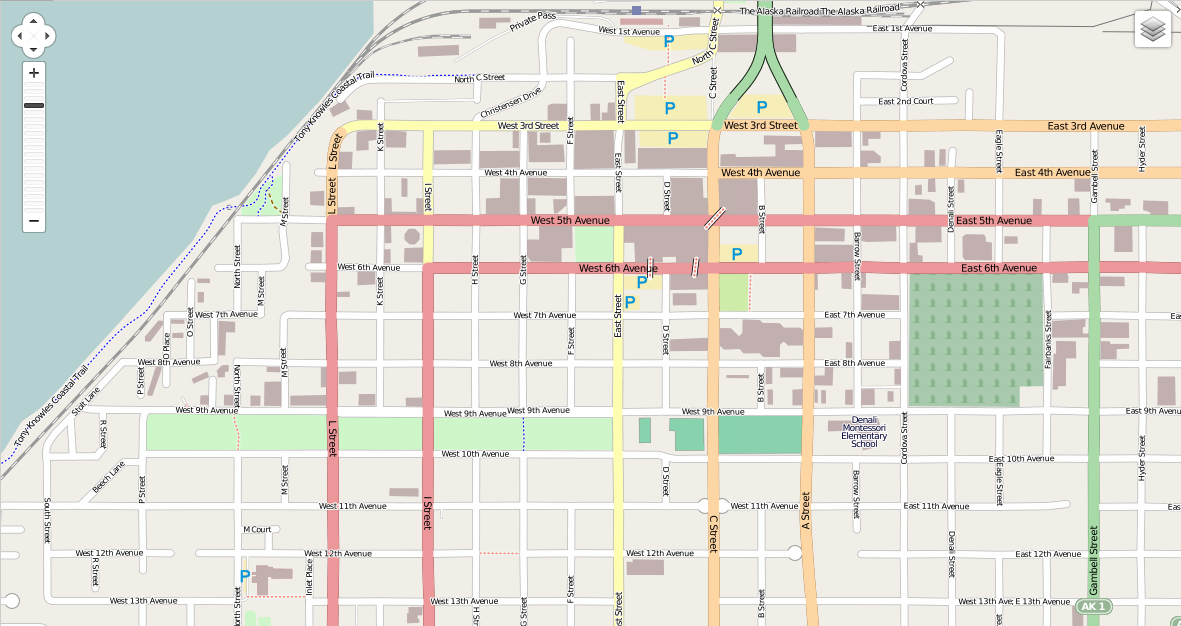
- Location within Downtown Anchorage Conoco-Phillips Building (Alaska)
- Alternative names: ARCO Tower

General information
- Type: Commercial offices
- Location: 700 G Street; Anchorage, Alaska
- Coordinates: 61.2151°N 149.8966°W
- Construction started: 1981
- Completed: 1983

Height
- Roof: 296 ft (90 m)

Technical details
- Floor count: 22; 1 below ground
- Lifts/elevators: 13

Design and construction
- Architects: Luckman Partnership; Harold Wirum & Associates
- Structural engineer: ABKJ

Website
- 700gstreet.com

The Conoco-Phillips Building is a 296-foot (90 m), 22-story office building in downtown Anchorage, Alaska, and is the tallest building in both Anchorage and the state of Alaska.

The Luckman Partnership of Los Angeles, in collaboration with local architects Harold Wirum & Associates, designed the Conoco-Phillips Building, originally named the ARCO Tower. Constructed between 1981 and 1983, it stands as a prominent landmark in Anchorage’s skyline, alongside the Robert B. Atwood Building.

The actual building is more of a complex, composed of the atrium, connecting with a smaller office tower. The main tower houses the Alaska regional corporate headquarters of ConocoPhillips, while the smaller tower consists of local branches of major companies, including the New York Life Insurance Company and KPMG. There is also a branch of the Alaska Club gym in the building.

The sky-lit atrium is open to the public, and has a small food court, as well as a water fountain. Sometimes public events are held here, notably the annual summer Wild Salmon on Parade local art auction.

== See also ==
- List of tallest buildings by U.S. state
- Robert B. Atwood Building
- List of tallest buildings in Anchorage
