= Cape Beaufort =

Cape in Alaska, United States

Coordinates: 69°02′N 163°50′W

Cape Beaufort is a cape on the coast of Chukchi Sea in North Slope Borough, Alaska, United States.

Cape Beaufort was named in 1826 for Captain Francis Beaufort.
