= Linny Pacillo Parking Garage =

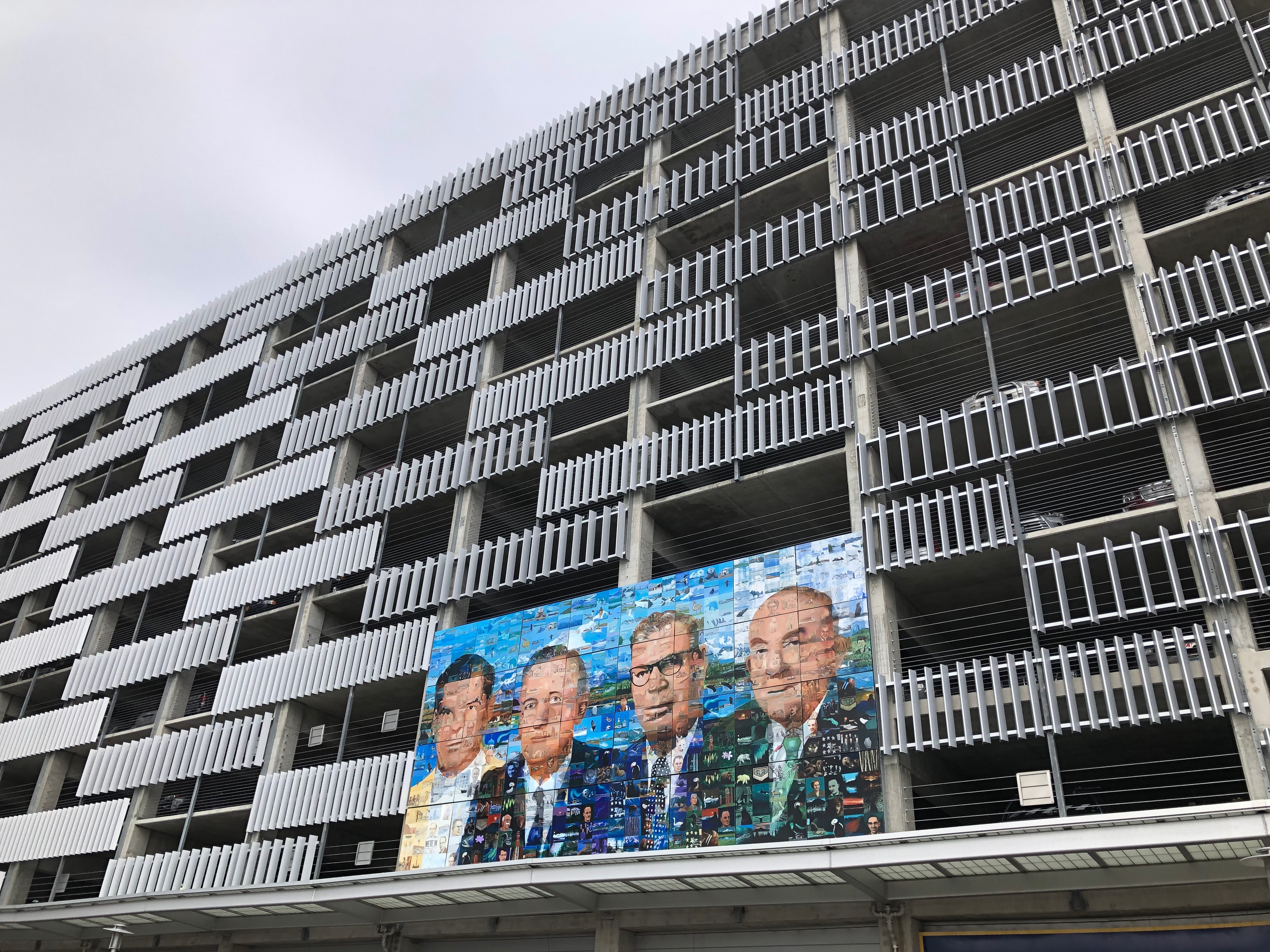
- "Focus on Statehood" mural on the Pacillo Parking Garage
- Interactive map of the Linny Pacillo Parking Garage area

General information
- Type: Parking garage
- Location: Downtown Anchorage, Alaska, US
- Coordinates: 61.2159°N 149.8925°W
- Construction started: February 1, 2007
- Construction stopped: September 8, 2008
- Owner: State of Alaska

Technical details
- Floor count: 10
- Floor area: 368,830 square feet (34,265 m^{2})

Design and construction
- Architect: Koonce Pfeffer Bettis Inc.

The Linny Pacillo Parking Garage is a 10-story parking garage in downtown Anchorage, Alaska, United States. The upper nine stories are for parking, with the first story serving as retail space. The structure contains a total of 368,830 square feet (34,265 m^{2}), including the retail space. Owned by the state government of Alaska, it provides 844 parking spaces for state employees, plus 40 spaces for visitors. The garage sits across from and services the Robert B. Atwood Building. The garage was built to replace parking spaces in downtown which were displaced by the construction of the Dena'ina Civic and Convention Center. The garage was designed by architects Koonce Pfeffer Bettis Inc. Construction of the garage began on February 1, 2007, and it opened on September 8, 2008. Tenants on the first floor are Northrim Bank, who have been inaugural tenants of the facility, and the Alaska Division of Motor Vehicles, who opened their downtown Anchorage office in the facility on November 9, 2010.

== Name ==
The garage is named after Carolyn "Linny" Pacillo (September 2, 1959 – November 17, 2006). Her family operated Courtney's Tudor Service on East Tudor Road, which was one of the last remaining independent gas stations in Anchorage. The Pacillo family sold the station in 2003, which has since gone out of business. Linny Pacillo, along with her sister Susan, became pop heroes in Anchorage (and later elsewhere) by donning tutus and plugging parking meters downtown to protest strict parking enforcement. They were The Parking Fairies. State Senator Johnny Ellis, a Democrat whose district includes downtown Anchorage, sponsored the bill naming the garage for Pacillo. The Anchorage Assembly approved the name in February 2007.

== Art ==
The art in the garage, under the 1 Percent for Art Program, includes art inspired by Alaska flora and fauna on each garage level, a piece in the main elevator lobby that tells the Parking Fairies story, and a mural over the Seventh Avenue exit titled "Focus on Statehood" that features four men instrumental in Alaska's becoming a state: Bob Atwood, Bill Egan, Bob Bartlett and Ernest Gruening. The mural, by Dan DeRoux, is made up of 540 smaller images from every community in the state, flora, fauna and the members of the Constitutional Convention.
