= Anchorage Trail Systems =

Multiuse trails in Alaska

The trail system of Anchorage, Alaska spans 578 miles (930.2 km). The Municipality of Anchorage created the first set of trail systems for recreation in the late 1950s, not developing a system that was commuter friendly until the mid-1960s. The trails, which are used primarily for recreation and commuter traffic, are heavily utilized year round for walking, biking, and skiing. Many of the trail systems in place that connect the city of Anchorage in a commuter-friendly way were kick started by John "Jack" Roderick, the first mayor of the Municipality of Anchorage, who held office from 1972 to 1975.

The Anchorage Trail Systems run through many local and state parks. The largest park that hosts a variety of trails is Chugach State Park. An innumerable number of trails cover this large area of land that stretches upwards of 495,000 acres (200,319 ha). The trail systems connect the greater Anchorage Bowl, the coastlines of Cook Inlet and Turnagain Arm, and the Chugach Mountain Range in Chugach State Park.

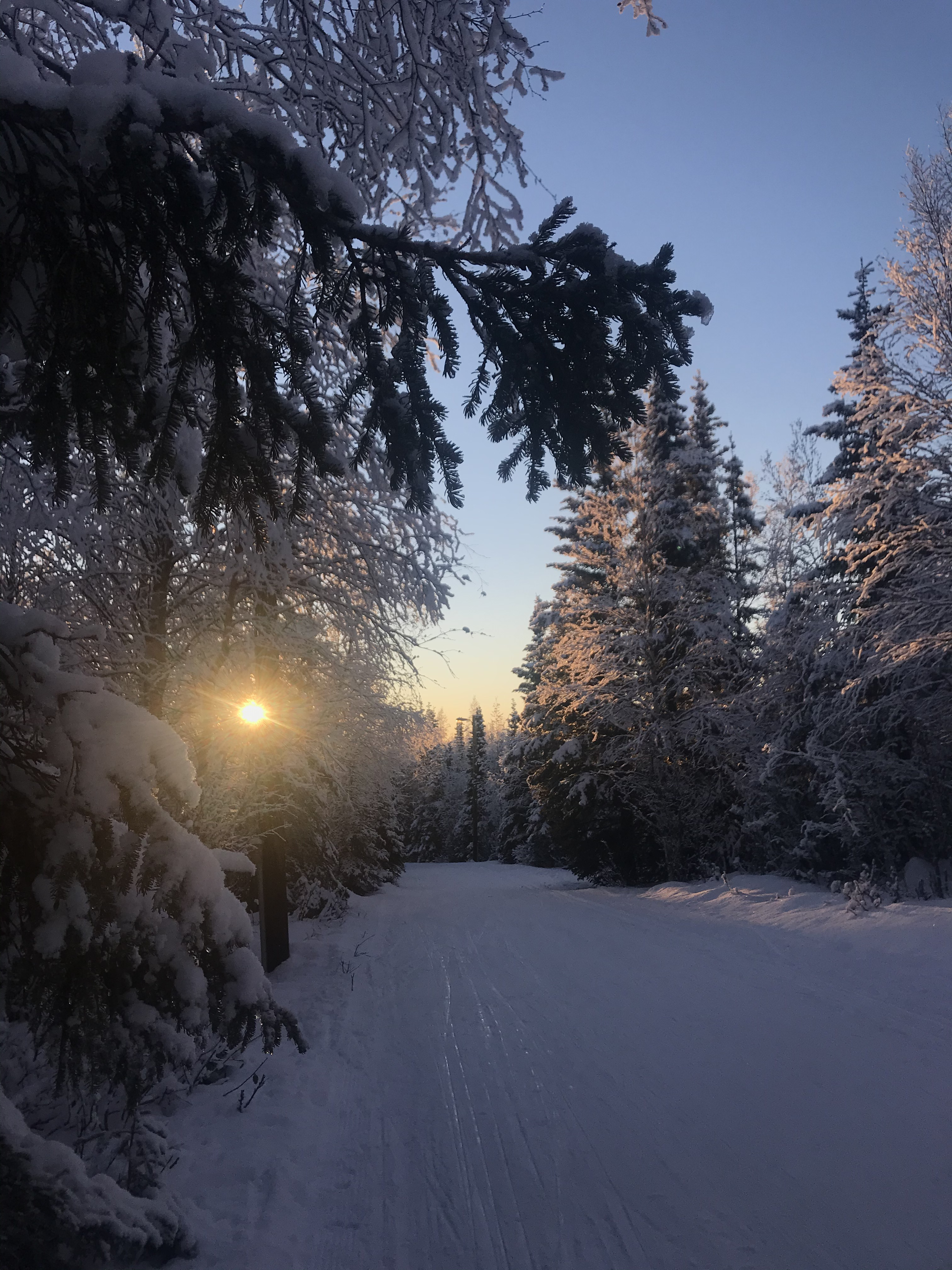
A sunny and groomed ski trail on the Lighted Loop Trail in Far North Bicentennial Park

Many trails in Anchorage are named in honor of individuals that made important contributions in the Anchorage community to an Anchorage trail system directly, or a person who had great success with a recreation/sport associated with the uses of the trail systems.

== History ==
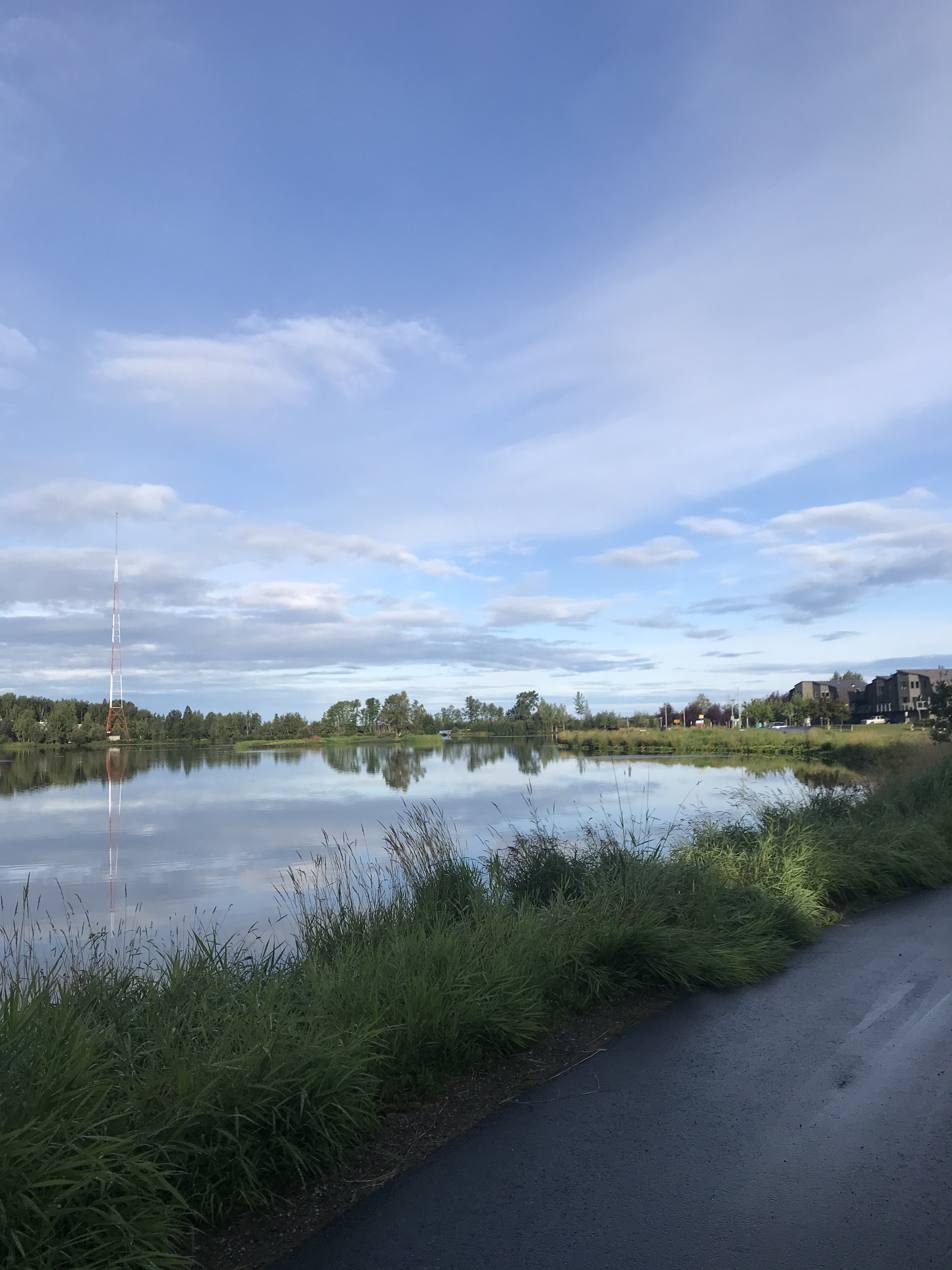
A view from Chester Creek Trail overlooking Westchester Lagoon

The Municipality of Anchorage was created in 1972. The State of Alaska became a state only a few decades earlier in the year 1959, shortly after President Eisenhower signed the Alaska Statehood Act. The first trails, constructed in the late 1950s, were developed by local people with private interests in recreation or transport. Municipality funding did not feed into the construction of these trails until the late 1960s. Paths in some of the original areas of the municipality linked neighborhoods and roadways but were used in a utilitarian manner rather than for sport. Anchorage trails are maintained by the State Park Service, Parks and Recreation, the Municipality of Anchorage, and private action groups who serve multiple user groups like skiers or bikers.

The Nordic Skiing Association of Anchorage (NSAA) was founded in the early 1960s when Nordic Skiing took Anchorage by storm. NSAA's contributions to the trail systems in Anchorage have been instrumental in creating well-kept areas for individuals to use in both winter and summer months. In 1976 the Municipality began to fund ski grooming on multi-use trail systems in the city. However, in 1983 a tax cap was initiated by local government and with that the onset of more private funding by local donors for ski grooming on ski-only trails began. NSAA (and many other trail advocate groups in Anchorage) are able to maintain trails year-round by private sponsorship, donations, and membership dues.

In more recent years, local action groups in Anchorage such as the Anchorage Park Foundation, Bike Anchorage and Single Track Advocates have come onto the scene and greatly developed trail networks in Anchorage for recreational uses. Single Track Advocates is a group that has catered its efforts primarily to mountain biking and an indirect result, trail running. One of the many things Bike Anchorage has done in Anchorage is strive for an increase of commuter-friendly and bike-friendly options in Anchorage. Since 2011, Single Track Advocates has added 16 miles of single track trails to Kincaid Park and 4.5 miles of mountain bike trials in Hillside Park. Both of these groups are a small portion of the many privately funded groups in Anchorage that contribute to the upkeep and advocacy for Anchorage trails that lie outside of the Parks and Recreation and Municipal departments. The Municipality of Anchorage has an Adopt-A-Trail program where monetary and time donations are accepted. Different portions of trails around the city are divided and adopted by local groups, companies, or individuals to help maintain the trails. The adopters of the trail earn their name posted with an Adopt-A-Trail sign as a form of advertisement for the group that "adopted" the trail. The initiative has experienced great success in creating a community that actively engages with trail maintenance out of private action groups or tax funded efforts.

== Recreational uses ==
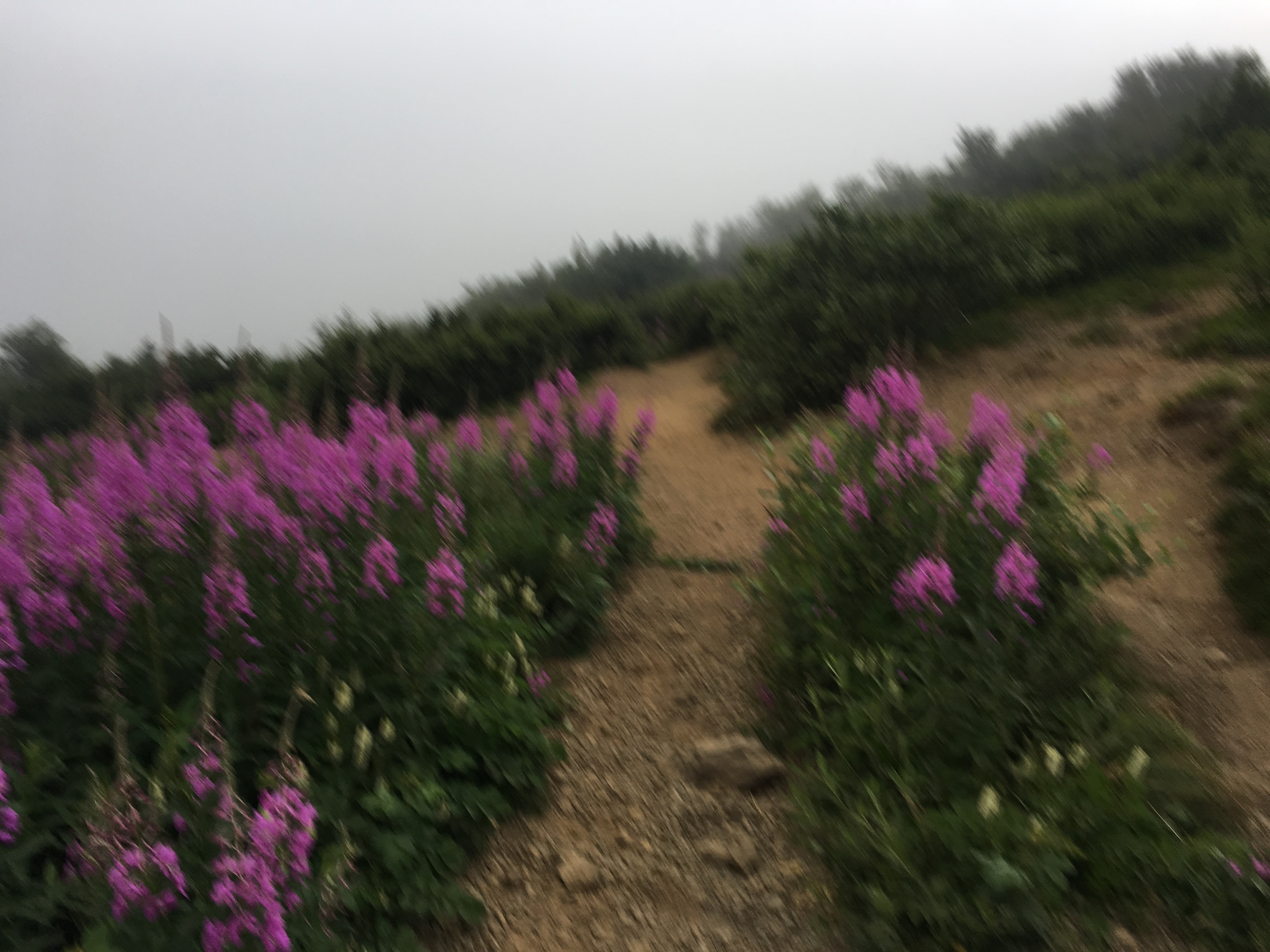
Fireweed lines a foggy hiking path near the Glenn Alps Trail Head in Chugach State Park

Anchorage Trails offer a multitude of year-round opportunities for recreation and sports.

Some of the activities that the trails host include Nordic skiing, hiking, trail and road running, walking, mountain biking, road biking, horseback riding, ski jouring, snowshoeing, rollerblading, and connections to innumerable parks, lakes, rivers and beaches that offer opportunities for fishing, water sports, and activities such as iceskating and ice fishing in the winter months.

Organized sport groups that are involved with various sports offer a great advantage to the conscious use of Anchorage's trails and their upkeep. The continuous improvement and expansion of Anchorage trails are largely motivated by sport groups, the main reason being that the maintenance of local trails are instrumental to the success of these organizations. Teams and sport groups in Anchorage range from youth programs such as Mighty Bikes, a non-profit mountain bike organization, to collegiate and professional sport individuals or teams that use the trails year round. Anchorage entertains a large base of professional and collegiate athletes that train on the trails independently or with groups such as the University of Alaska Anchorage and Alaska Pacific University.

== Commuter uses ==
Outside of sports and recreation, Anchorage is a city that has developed into a more commuter friendly city in recent years for individuals on foot or on a bike. Because of the layout of the city, Anchorage has faced many challenges to create a system of trail networks that not only provide connections to the entire area but a system that also provides safety for its users. In conjunction with trails- sparse bike lanes, wide road shoulders, and sidewalks that are plowed semi-regularly during the winter months are utilized by commuter traffic. Many neighborhoods in Anchorage are connected by means of the trail systems. Jack Roderick, Anchorage's mayor from 1972 to 1975, was the first local government official to recognize that Anchorage needed to become a place that could provide commuter options for individuals who did not own a car. Since his actions to develop the trail systems in that regard were started, Anchorage has slowly plugged away at evolving their trails to serve not only the recreational user but also the commuter. Some examples of this are demonstrated by the Anchorage Bicycle Plan or the recent addition of Moose Loop, a trail that connects the greater Anchorage Bowl. The 32-mile loop not only opened up a great deal of new options for commuters to stay off the busy roads, but also provided for individuals wishing to see Anchorage in a non-commuter setting.

== Popular trail options ==
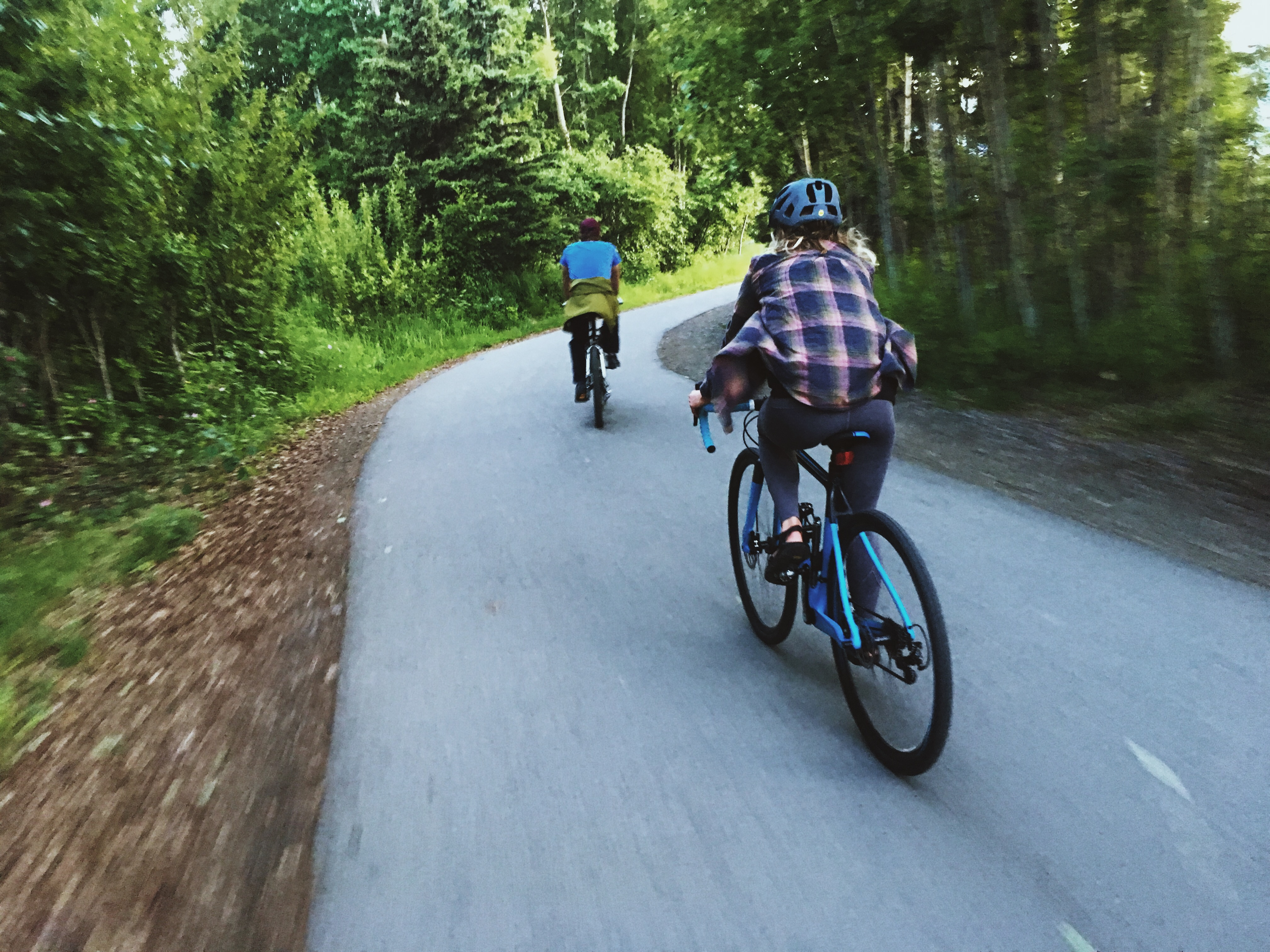
Anchorage locals enjoy a scenic bike ride through the Lynn Ary Park corridor of the Tony Knowles Coastal Trail

Tony Knowles Coastal Trail is a highly trafficked trail that runs along Cook Inlet. The trail is named after Tony Knowles, Anchorage's governor from 1994 to 2002. While the trail runs along Cook Inlet, it also connects its users to places such as Westchester Lagoon and has also been included as a part of the recently completed Moose Loop. The Chester Creek trails, Campbell Creek trailheads, Earthquake Park, Point Woronzof, and various neighborhoods such as Turnagain and Fairview are included in these new connections as well.

Far North Bicentennial Park is an area that covers an expansive area of the Chugach foothills as well as a connection to areas such as Chugach State Park, Moose Loop, Campbell Creek Science Center, Hilltop Ski Area, and the Tour Trail of Anchorage. The park covers over 100 miles of land and offers countless trails.

Kincaid Park is another hub that connects with Cook Inlet, Moose Loop, and the Coastal Trail. Kincaid park has hosted national sport events and local events ranging from activities such as weddings, cross country running meets, frolf tournaments, and state soccer championships. The trails that run around the area are home to a dense moose and bear population.

== Safety and statistics ==
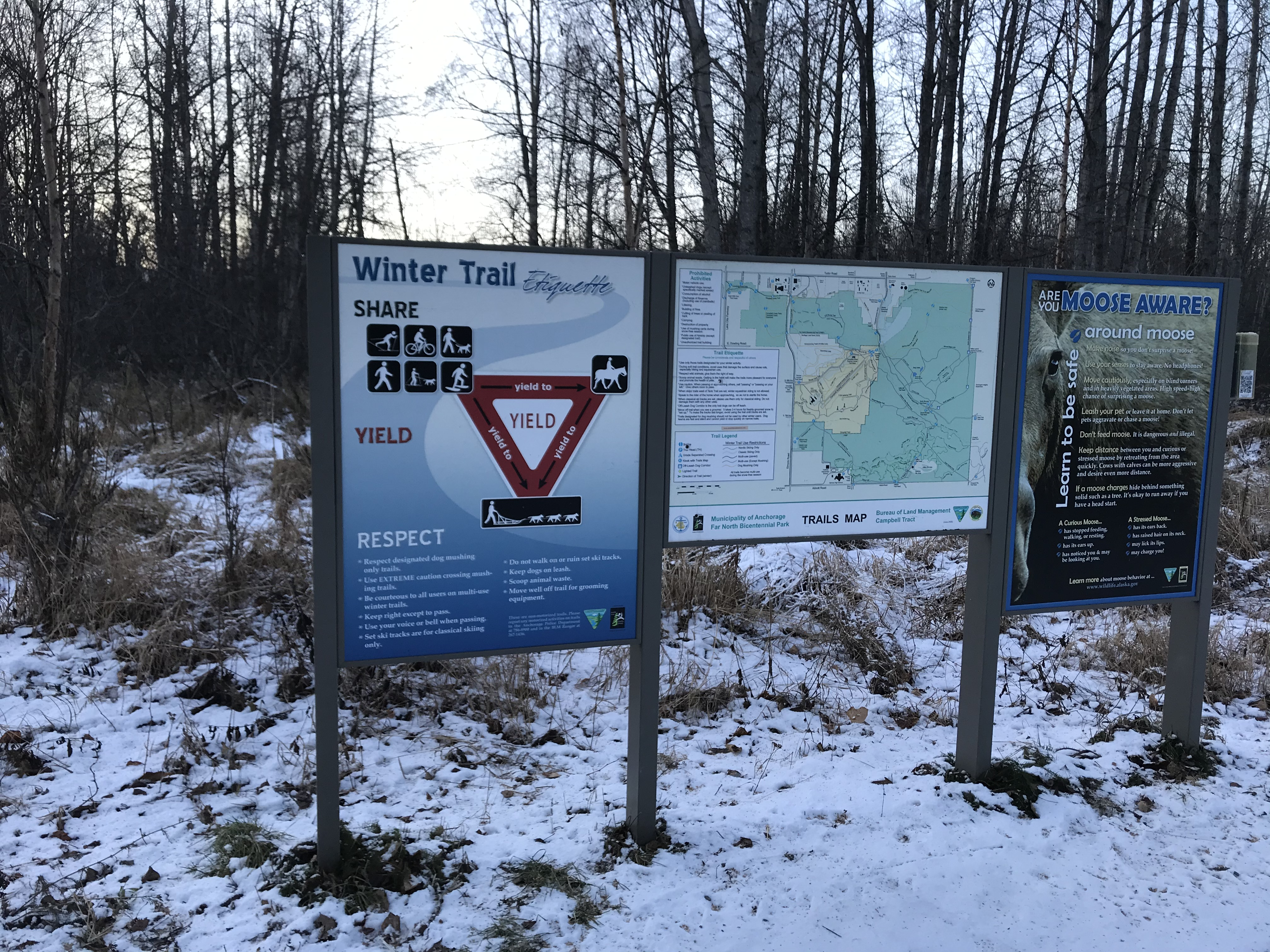
Infographics line Anchorage trails all over the city to inform its users of traffic flow, safety information, and often fun facts about the area and its history.

Anchorage Trail Systems require certain precautions to ensure the safety and enjoyment of all of its users. Trail etiquette and trail flow charts are frequently posted to inform users of what trails can be used for which activities as well as how one should yield to other users depending on the activity they are practicing. Anchorage is home to a variety of wildlife that can be dangerous. Users of the trails should be aware of how to proceed if they encounter moose or bears. Bear spray, bells, awareness of one's surroundings, reflective wear, appropriate gear for the activity you are practicing, and not wearing headphones are ways that one can help ensure their safety.

The Municipality of Anchorage lists the following statistics for the trail systems:

120 miles (195 km) paved trail systems (multi-use)

105 miles (175 km) groomed ski trails

103 mies (216 km) plowed winter walkways

36 miles (60 km) dog mushing trails

87 miles (145 km) summer non-paved trails

24 miles (40 km) lighted ski trails

66 km ski jor trails

10 km exclusively equestrian trails

Chugach State Park: 495,000 acres.

These statistics roughly represent the paved pathways in Anchorage but do not take into account possible commuter routes that are not official trail systems.
