= David Roderick (disambiguation) =

David Roderick (born 1970) is an American poet.

David Roderick may also refer to:

- David Roderick Curtis (1927–2017), Australian pharmacologist and neurobiologist
- David Roderick (politician) (1921–2017), American politician
- David M. Roderick, American business executive
- David Roderick Shukman (born 1958), British journalist
