= Tony Knowles Coastal Trail =

Bike trail in Anchorage, Alaska named for the American politician

Coordinates: 61°13′14″N 149°53′51″W

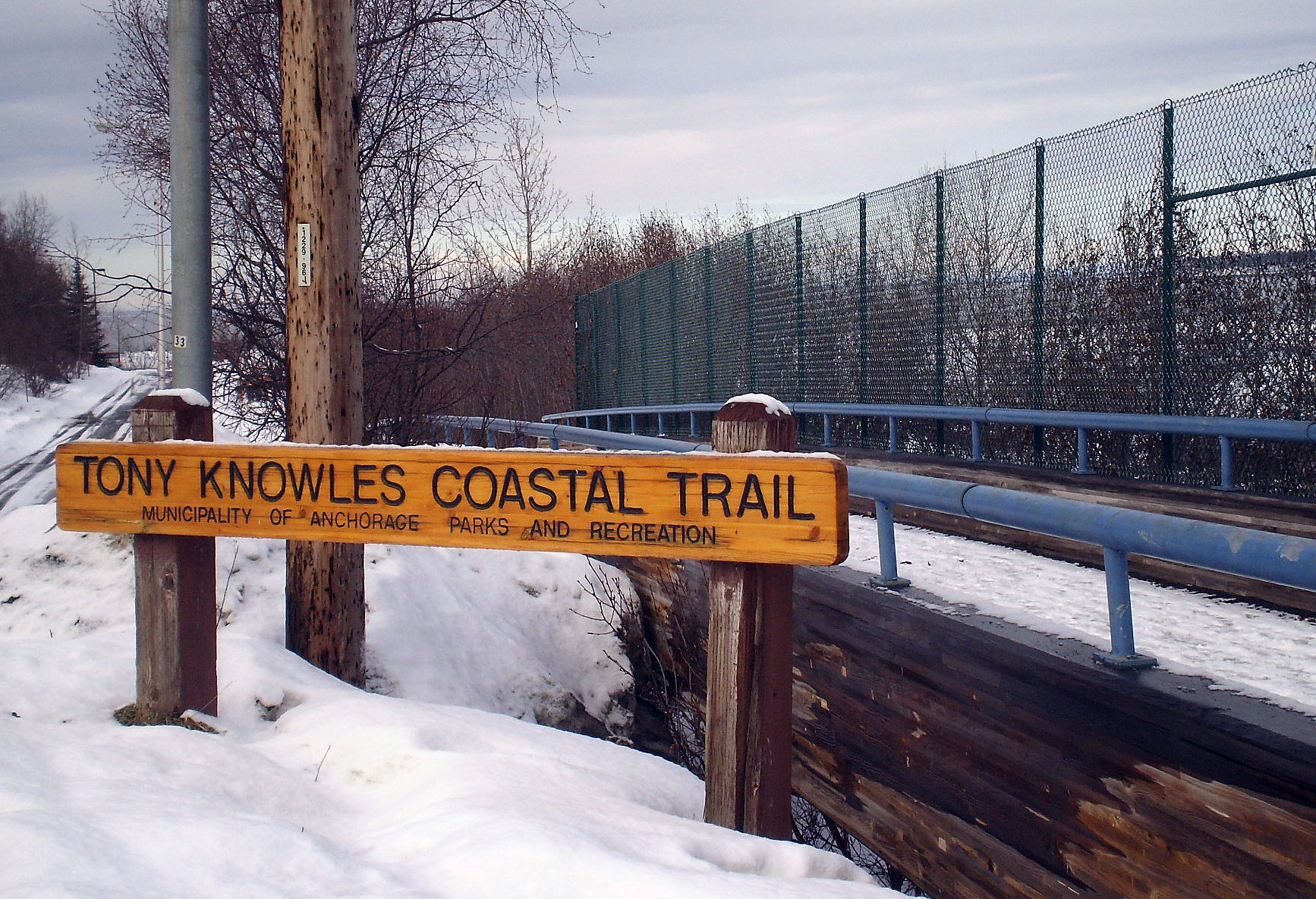
Tony Knowles Coastal Trail - Second Avenue Entrance.

The Tony Knowles Coastal Trail is an 11-mile-long (18 km) trail along the coast of Anchorage, Alaska designated for non-motorized use. The trail runs from Second Avenue in downtown Anchorage and finishes in Kincaid Park. The trail is entirely paved, supports two-way traffic, and connects with the Chester Creek Trail. Point Woronzof Park borders the coastal trail to the east for about a mile, starting at about mile 5.0. In the summer, the trail is used extensively by walkers, runners, rollerbladers, and cyclists. In the winter, the trail is used primarily for cross country skiing and also skijoring. The trail is a portion of the annual Tour of Anchorage cross country ski marathon. The trail's namesake is the former Anchorage mayor and Alaska governor.

The Trail was pioneered and designed by the firm of Arctic Engineers, Inc., wholly owned and operated by Sidney E. Clark, P.E.
