= Georgeson Botanical Garden =

Botanical Garden in Fairbanks, Alaska

- Location within Alaska
- Type: Public
- Location: 117 West Tanana Drive in Fairbanks, Alaska, United States.
- Nearest city: Fairbanks, Alaska
- Coordinates: 64°51′21.96″N 147°51′32.04″W
- Open: 1991
- Status: Open
- Website: www.uaf.edu/afes/places/gbg/index.php

The Georgeson Botanical Garden is located at 117 West Tanana Drive on the University of Alaska Fairbanks campus in Fairbanks, Alaska, United States. The five-acre garden hosts a variety of research and educational programs in subarctic horticulture. It is open to the public during daylight hours, May through September, for a fee. It is part of the Alaska Agricultural and Forestry Experiment Station. The garden was named after Charles Christian Georgeson, who was USDA Special Agent in Charge of Alaska Investigations in 1899. Dr. Georgeson arrived in Alaska during the Gold Rush to research the possibilities for agriculture in Alaska. He surveyed the land near Fairbanks and started the Fairbanks Experiment Farm. A portion of the land was later annexed for use as the first campus of the University of Alaska.

Research at the garden involves a variety of plants including annual flowers, vegetables and perennial ornamentals with an emphasis on Alaska native plants. A ten-year effort begun in 2001 to explore the possibility of exporting fresh cut flowers has led to a small industry centered on peonies. Flowers have been exported to retail and wholesale markets since 2007. Because of Alaska's northern environment, many flowers bloom later than other regions, providing a competitive advantage on world markets. Research results are available on the GBG website. Research also emphasizes domestication and management of wild stands especially of Alaska wild blueberries and lingonberries.

== See also ==
- Alaska Botanical Garden
- List of botanical gardens and arboretums in Alaska
