= Fire Island (Anchorage, Alaska) =

Island in Anchorage, Alaska, USA

Native name: Nutuł'iy
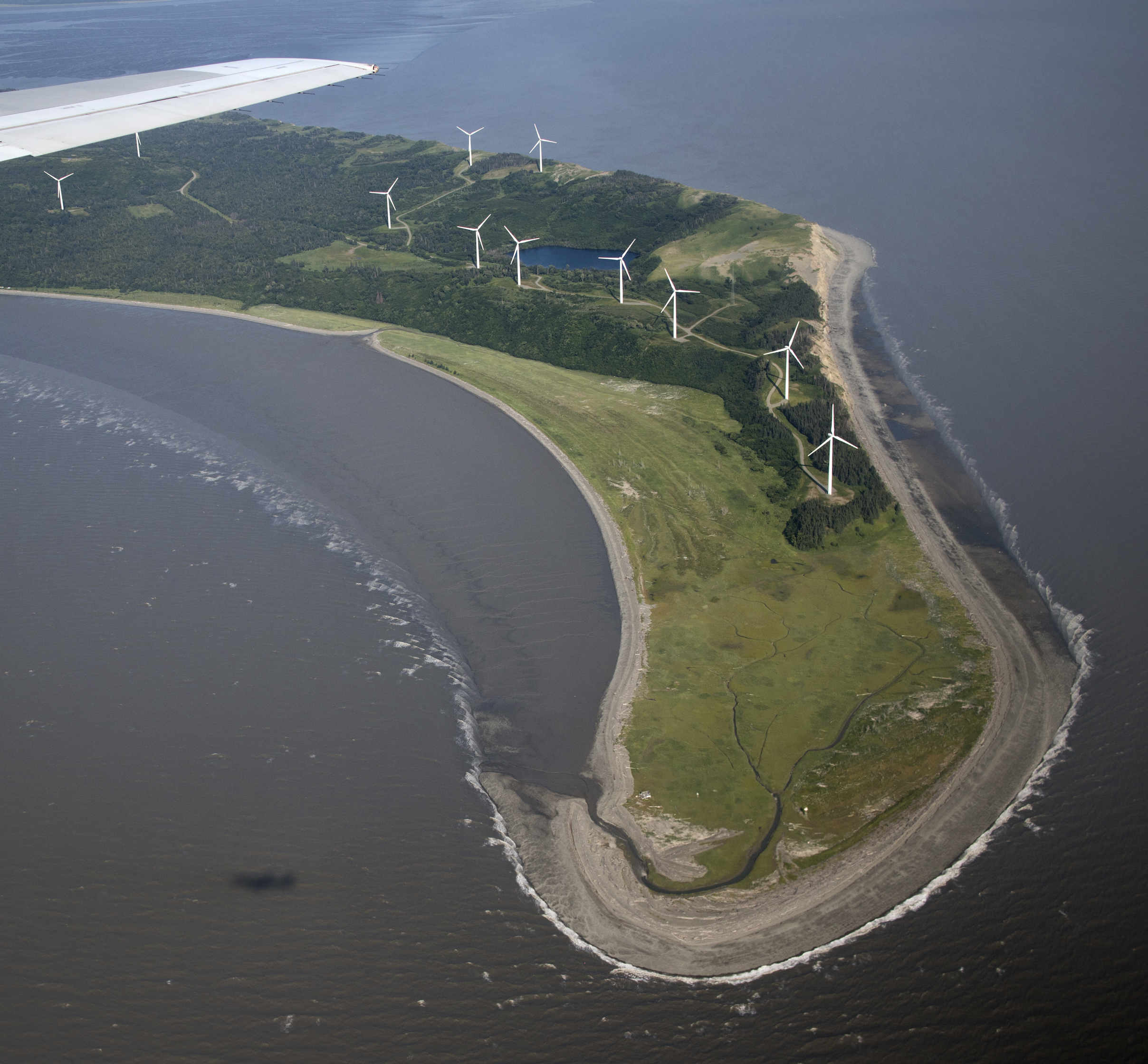
- Aerial view of Fire Island
- Interactive map of Fire Island

Geography
- Location: Cook Inlet
- Area: 6.744 sq mi (17.47 km^{2})

Administration
- United States
- State: Alaska
- City: Anchorage

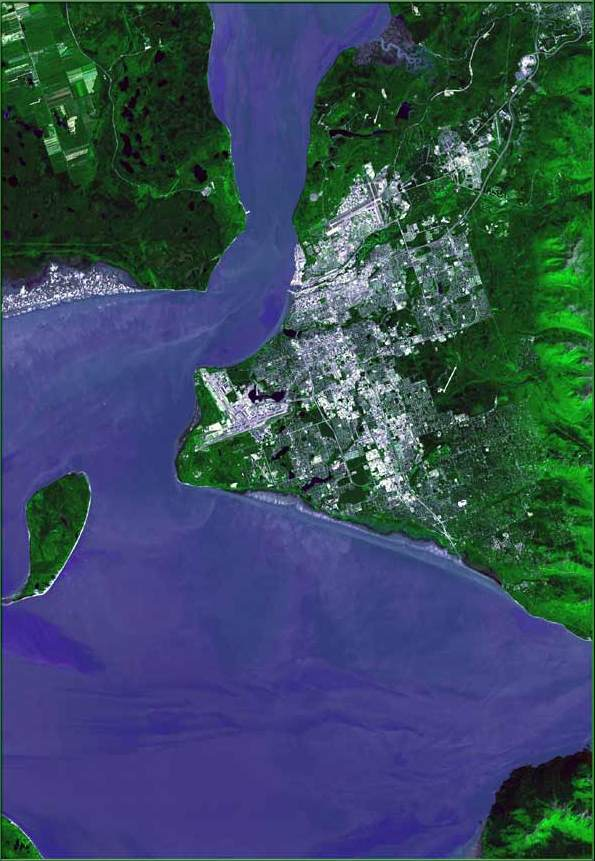
The Anchorage area from space, showing Fire Island on the left.

Fire Island (Dena'ina: Nutuł'iy) is a 5.5-mile (8.9 km) long island in the U.S. state of Alaska, located near the head of Cook Inlet at 61°09′34″N 150°11′55″W. It is the only island in the Municipality of Anchorage, sitting three miles (4.8 km) off the city's Point Campbell, and nine miles (14 km) from downtown. Its land area is 17.467 km^{2} (6.744 sq mi; 4,316 acres), and there was no permanent resident population at the 2000 census.

== Geology ==
Fire Island is underlain by sedimentary rocks, atop which lie deep sand and gravel deposits from the surrounding tidal estuary. The island is ringed by steep bluffs that average about 60 metres (200 ft) high, and the land elevation ranges from 25 to 90 above sea level. At low tide, it is possible to walk across the mud flats of the Cook Inlet to reach Fire Island. Hikers occasionally attempt the 3.5-mile (5.6-km) trek from Kincaid Park, but the incoming tide can make the journey dangerous, and people have been known to drown.

The island is dominated by forests similar to those found in the Alaskan interior, and bogs are found in poorly drained low-lying areas. Small areas of tidal marshes and salt grasses exist in the west and northeast. There is little fresh water on Fire Island, since there are only a few small lakes and the water table is prone to salt-water intrusion.

== History ==
The island's Dena’ina name is Nutuł’iy, or "object that stands in the water". Europeans first saw the island during Captain Cook's expedition up what was named the Cook Inlet. Cook's men landed on the island and named it "Currant Island." Later, George Vancouver called it "Turnagain Island" in 1794, after the Turnagain Arm, which the southeast side of the island faces. In 1847, the Russian Hydrographical Department published Chart 1378, which named the island Ostrov Mushukhli (Mushukhli Island), possibly an approximation of Nutuł’iy. "Fire Island" had become established by 1895, when that name was published by the United States Coast and Geodetic Survey.

A Dena’ina elder reported that a village had once existed in Fire Island, but an epidemic forced the survivors to move south to Point Possession, across the Turnagain Arm on the Kenai Peninsula, sometime before 1934. Nonetheless, Fire Island was the site of Dena’ina fish camps from 1918 until the 1970s. From 1909 to 1955, the island was designated as a breeding ground for Alaska moose. During World War II, the U.S. Army used it as an observation point to guard against Japanese submarines.

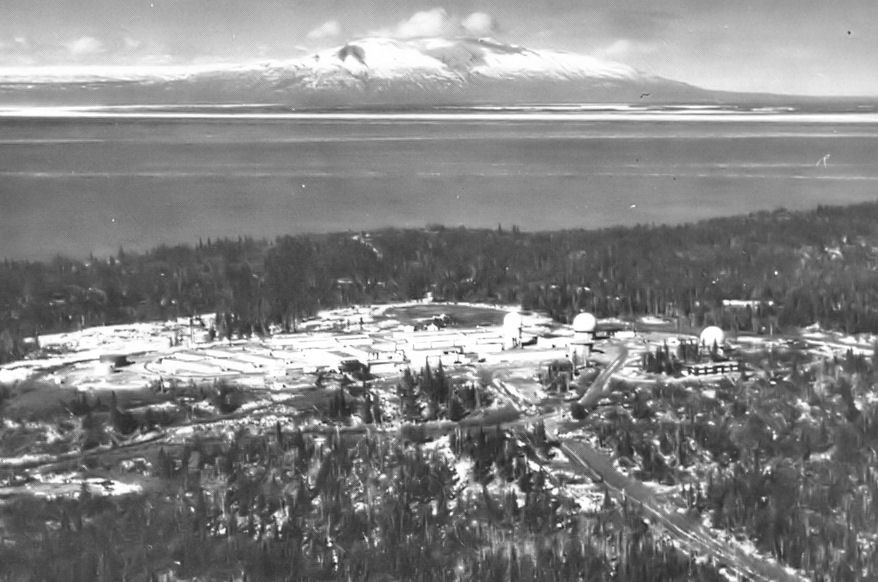
Fire Island Air Force Station

=== Fire Island Air Force Station ===
In September 1951, the U.S. Air Force 626th Aircraft Control and Warning Squadron was established on the island at a base on its southern end called Fire Island Air Force Station. Staffed by about 200 personnel, the base was an air defense radar center and Nike surface-to-air missile site for NORAD, doubling as a Federal Aviation Administration air traffic control radar and communications site. Since the island is not connected to the mainland, all supplies came by helicopter from Elmendorf Air Force Base and, during summer, by barge from Anchorage. A runway was built during the first years of the base's existence; however, during the 1964 Alaska earthquake – one of the largest in recorded history – the airfield subsided into the ocean, leaving helicopter as the only way of reaching the island by air.

Fire Island AFS closed in 1969, leaving the FAA as the sole user of the island. The base site was cleaned up in the 1990s, and the facilities razed. The FAA site stayed open until 1980, when new Kenai-based radar became active. In 1982, the site of the old air station was turned over to the native corporation Cook Inlet Region, Inc. (CIRI) as federal surplus property.

Currently, CIRI owns 90% of Fire Island's 4,000 acres, the rest belonging to the FAA and the US Coast Guard. The FAA maintains a private general aviation airfield on the east corner of the island, which has one runway. Data from 1976 showed the airfield hosted, on average, 25 landings and takeoffs each month. Access to the island is by permission only.

== Wind farm ==
The island's wind farm began operating commercially on September 24, 2012. At present, there is an 11-turbine, 17.6-megawatt wind farm located on Fire Island. The installation is owned and operated by Fire Island Wind LLC, a subsidiary of Cook Inlet Region, Inc. (CIRI), the owners of the island. The turbines’ nacelles rise to 262 feet (80 m) above the ground, about the height of Anchorage's Robert B. Atwood Building, which is the city's second-tallest. An underwater transmission line connects the wind farm to the Anchorage power grid.

The wind farm is the first megawatt-scale wind project in Southcentral Alaska. According to the producers, the installation powers 5,600 homes in Anchorage. Though the FAA currently permits only 11 turbines, the farm has the capacity to triple in size to 33.

=== Project history ===
Since the abandonment of the air force station, various uses had been suggested for the island, including an expansion of the Port of Anchorage or the development of industrial facilities. Although drinking-water supplies were judged insufficient to support commercial or industrial development, in the early 1990s the utility Chugach Electric determined that Fire Island is a favorable location for a wind farm. Deciding factors included not just strong and steady winds, but also proximity to the Anchorage area and lack of conflicting land-use issues.

In 2000, Chugach Electric approached CIRI, the owners of Fire Island, with a proposal that CIRI build a wind farm there and sell the electricity to the Anchorage power grid. Measurements taken over the next several years reconfirmed the site's viability for producing commercial wind power. The FAA, operators of nearby Anchorage International Airport, cautiously approved the project in 2008 after deciding that the wind turbines would not interfere with their radar equipment.

Work on the installation commenced in 2009, and construction of the turbines themselves took place over the summer of 2012. On September 24, 2012, all 11 turbines began feeding into the Anchorage electrical grid.
