= List of botanical gardens and arboretums in Alaska =

This list of botanical gardens and arboretums in Alaska is intended to include all significant botanical gardens and arboretums in the U.S. state of Alaska. There are four botanical gardens in Alaska listed as having been designated significant.

Name	Image	Affiliation	City
Alaska Botanical Garden		N/A	Anchorage
Georgeson Botanical Garden		University of Alaska Fairbanks	Fairbanks
Jensen-Olson Arboretum		City and Borough of Juneau	Juneau
Pratt Museum and Park Botanical Garden		Pratt Museum and Park	Homer
