= Cook Inlet Region, Inc. =

Alaska Native regional corporation

Cook Inlet Region, Inc. (CIRI) is one of thirteen Alaska Native regional corporations created under the Alaska Native Claims Settlement Act of 1971 (ANCSA) in settlement of aboriginal land claims. Cook Inlet Region, Inc. was incorporated in Alaska on June 8, 1972. Headquartered in Anchorage, Alaska, CIRI is a for-profit corporation, and is owned by more than 7,300 Alaska Native shareholders of Athabascan and Southeast Indian, Inupiat, Yup’ik, Alutiiq and Aleut descent.

The CIRI region in the Cook Inlet area of southcentral Alaska is the traditional homeland of the Dena'ina and Ahtna Athabaskan peoples, and about 40 percent of CIRI shareholders are of Dena'ina or Ahtna descent. However, as the CIRI region also holds the urban center of Alaska, including Alaska's largest city, Anchorage, the region has attracted Alaska Natives from many other parts of the state. Consequently, CIRI's shareholder population is diverse, including descendants of all Alaska Native cultures, including Dena'ina, Ahtna, other Athabaskans, Tlingit, Tsimshian, Eyak and Haida Indians; Iñupiat, Yup'ik, Siberian Yupik, and Alutiiq Eskimos; and Aleuts. As a result, about 20% of CIRI's shareholders also enrolled in Cook Inlet's ANCSA "Village Corporations". Most other ANCSA regional corporations have the opposite 80/20 At-large/Village shareholder ratio, demonstrating urban migration and assimilation patterns that affect the operations of the regional corporations.

== Officers and Directors ==
A current listing of Cook Inlet Region, Inc.'s officers and directors, as well as documents filed with the State of Alaska since CIRI's incorporation, are available online through the Corporations Database of the Division of Corporations, Business & Professional Licensing, Alaska Department of Commerce, Community and Economic Development.

== Shareholders ==
At incorporation, Cook Inlet Region, Inc. enrolled about 7,000 Alaska Native shareholders, each of whom received 100 shares of CIRI stock. Currently CIRI has about 7,300 shareholders. As an ANCSA corporation, CIRI has no publicly traded stock and its shares cannot be sold; they can be transferred by gift or inheritance, almost always to descendants or relatives.

== Business enterprises ==
Under federal law, Cook Inlet Region, Inc. and its majority-owned subsidiaries, joint ventures and partnerships are deemed to be "minority and economically disadvantaged business enterprise[s]" (43 USC 1626(e)).

It owns the majority of Fire Island near Anchorage as well as an 11-turbine wind farm on it.

== Underground Coal Gasification Proposal ==
In October 2009, Cook Inlet Region, Inc. announced plans to pursue the first underground coal gasification project in the country... This project has been touted as being environmentally friendlier than traditional coal combustion, but concerns still remain about groundwater contamination and possibilities for carbon dioxide remittance.
