= Alaska Botanical Garden =

Botanical garden in Anchorage, Alaska

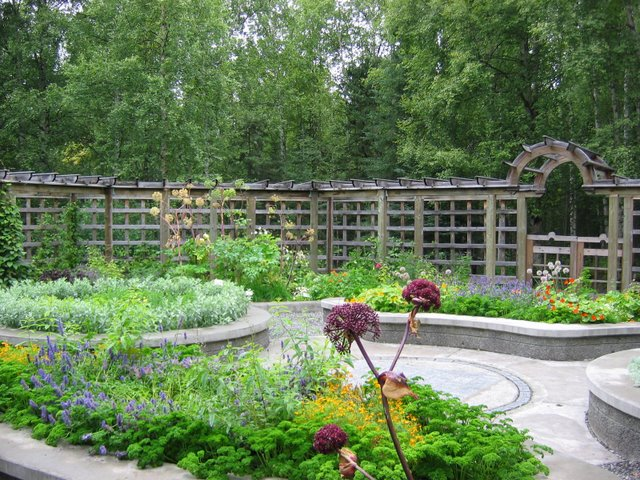
- The herb garden

- Location within Alaska
- Type: Public
- Location: 4601 Campbell Airstrip Road, Anchorage, Alaska, United States
- Nearest city: Anchorage, Alaska
- Coordinates: 61°10′37.2″N 149°45′36″W
- Area: 80 acres (32 ha)
- Open: 1993
- Status: Open
- Website: www.alaskabg.org

The Alaska Botanical Garden is a 110-acre (44.5 ha) botanical garden located inside the Far North Bicentennial Park at 4601 Campbell Airstrip Road, Anchorage, Alaska, United States. It is an independent non-profit organization which opened in 1993, is open year-round, and charges admission to support its mission. The mission of the Garden it to enhance the beauty and value of plant material through education, preservation, recreation and research.

The Garden's land consists mainly of spruce and birch forest. It features 8 developed demonstration gardens and a special location for Junior Master Gardeners. 80 acres (32.4 ha) of the site is fenced to protect these gardens from moose. The gardens include:

- Over 1,100 species of perennials in the Upper and Lower Perennial Gardens (of which some 150 are native to Alaska)
- An herb garden
- A rock garden with over 350 types of alpine plants
- A wildflower walk
- The 1.1-mile (1.8 km) Lowenfels Family Nature Trail

== See also ==
- List of botanical gardens and arboretums in Alaska
- Georgeson Botanical Garden
