= Libby Roderick =

American singer-songwriter

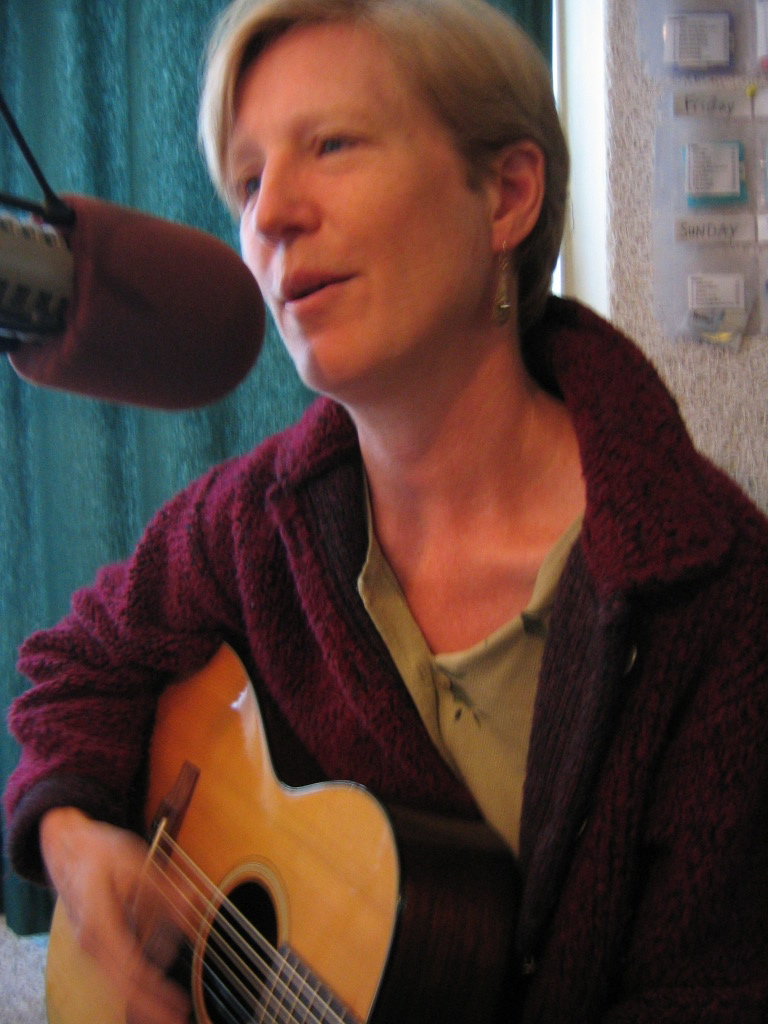
- Roderick as a guest on a Portland, Maine radio station in 2007.

Background information
- Born: Elizabeth Roderick c. 1958 (age 67–68)
- Origin: Anchorage, Territory of Alaska, US
- Genre: Folk
- Occupations: Singer, songwriter
- Instruments: singing, guitar
- Years active: 1985–present
- Label: Turtle Island Records
- Website: www.libbyroderick.com

Libby Roderick (born 1958) is an American singer, songwriter, recording artist, poet, activist, and teacher. The global impact of her song "How Could Anyone" has been featured on CNN, on CBS, and in the Associated Press. Her music has been featured at the U.N. Conference on Women, with Coretta Scott King and Walter Cronkite in Washington D.C., and played on Mars by NASA. She has toured extensively throughout North America, playing at folk venues, conferences, and universities.

== Personal life ==
She was born and raised in Anchorage, Alaska, where she still lives part of the time. Her father, John "Jack" Roderick, a Yale football star, was mayor of the Greater Anchorage Area Borough, and her late mother, Martha, was a renowned Alaska educator. Libby graduated summa cum laude from Yale University in American Studies, and has worked as a TV and print news reporter, radio consultant, nuclear weapons educator and writer on Alaska Native issues.

Libby is also the cousin of John Roderick, Seattle-based podcaster and singer/songwriter.

== Discography ==
=== Studio albums ===
- If You See a Dream (Turtle Island Records, 1990)
- Thinking Like a Mountain (Turtle Island Records, 1991)
- If the World Were My Lover (Turtle Island Records, 1993)
- Lay it All Down (Turtle Island Records, 1997)
- A Meditation for Healing (Turtle Island Records, 1998)
- How Could Anyone (Turtle Island Records, 2005)
- " Winter Wheat" (Turtle Island Records, 2017)

=== Compilations ===
- How Could Anyone (2005)

=== Compilations featuring Libby Roderick songs ===
- One Land, One Heart (Musicians United to Sustain the Environment, 1999).

Includes "Low to the Ground" from Thinking Like a Mountain (1991). Other participants: Greg Wagner, Magpie, Susan Grace, Dakota Sid Clifford, Karen Goldberg, David Elias, Alice DiMicele, John McCutcheon, Lydia Adams Davis, Peter Berryman & Lou Berryman, Joanne Rand, Dana Lyons, Walkin' Jim Stoltz, Paul Winter

== Songbook ==
- 1994. When I Hear Music. Anchorage, AK: Turtle Island Records. Lyrics, music, and guitar chords for songs from If You See A Dream (1990) and Thinking Like A Mountain (1991).

== Writings ==
- 1985. Alaska Women's History Resource Booklet. Anchorage, AK: Western Media Concepts. Produced by the Alaska Women's History Project.
- 1999. "This Holy Earth." In Prayers for a Thousand Years. Ed. by Elizabeth Roberts and Elias Amidon. San Francisco: HarperSanFrancisco, pp. 192–193.
- 2001. "Another Country." In Arctic Refuge: A Circle of Testimony. Ed by Hank Lentfer and Carolyn Servid. Minneapolis, MN: Milkweed Editions, pp. 64–65.
- 2008. Associate Editor, Start Talking: A Handbook for Engaging Difficult Dialogues in Higher Education, ed by Kay Landis. (https://www.uaa.alaska.edu/cafe/difficultdialogues/handbook.cfm) University of Alaska Anchorage.
- 2010. Editor, Alaska Native Cultures and Issues. University of Alaska Press.
- 2010. "Winter Wheat" In Moral Ground: Ethical Action for a Planet in Peril, ed. Kathleen Dean Moore. Trinity University Press.
- 2013. Co-author, Stop Talking: Indigenous Ways of Teaching and Learning and Difficult Dialogues in Higher Education, with Ilarion (Larry) Merculieff. (https://www.alaska.edu/uapress/browse/detail/index.xml?id=402). University of Alaska.
- 2016. Editor, Toxic Friday: Resources for Addressing Faculty Bullying in Higher Education. (http://www.difficultdialoguesuaa.org) University of Alaska.
