= Jack Roderick (politician) =

American politician (1926-2020)

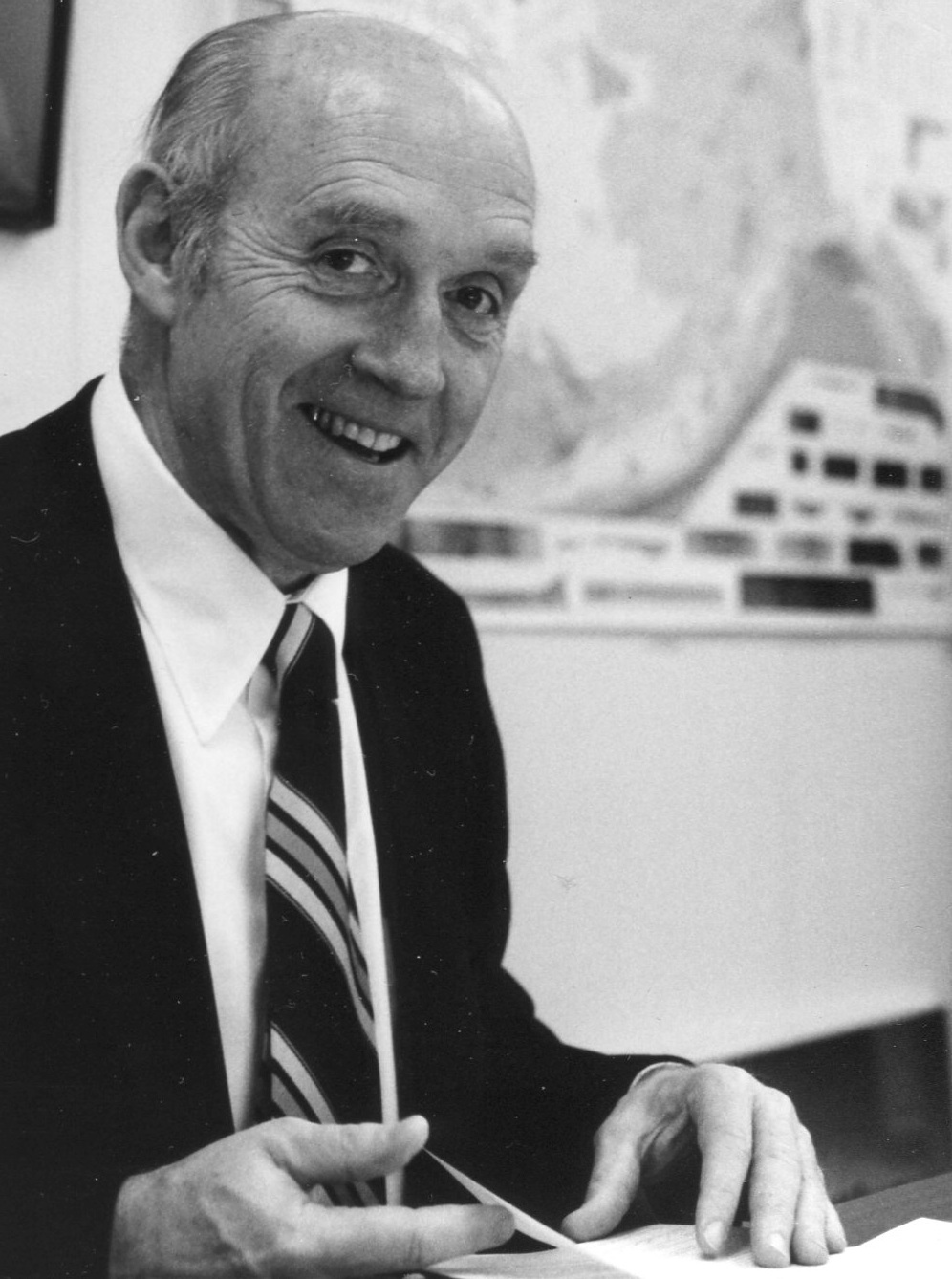

Mayor of Anchorage
- In office October 3, 1972 – September 16, 1975
- Preceded by: John M. Asplund
- Succeeded by: George M. Sullivan

Personal details
- Born: March 16, 1926 Seattle, Washington, U.S.
- Died: October 19, 2020 (aged 94) Anchorage, Alaska, U.S.
- Spouse: Martha Martin (m. 1955; died 2008)
- Children: 2, including Libby
- Relatives: David Roderick (brother); John Roderick (nephew)
- Education: Yale University (BA); University of Washington (JD); Harvard University (MPA)

John R. Roderick (March 16, 1926 – October 19, 2020) was an American lawyer and politician who served as the mayor of Anchorage, Alaska from 1972 to 1975.

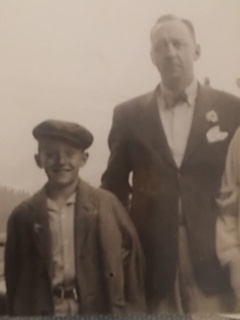
Roderick with his father David Morgan Roderick

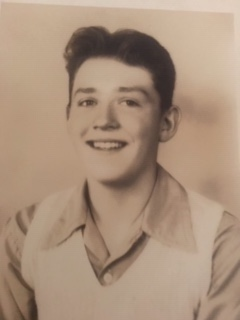
Roderick as teenager

== Early life and education ==
Originally from Seattle, Washington, Roderick was the son of a Presbyterian preacher who served in France during World War I. His parents divorced when he was 11 years old. In an interview, he stated that he was not born to work in a big city and he wanted to be his own person.

Roderick attended Broadway High School, graduating in 1944. Shortly after graduating high school, he went to London for a summer course in economics at the Leeds University, where he played basketball, football, and was a member of the track team as a teenager. During his formative years, he continued to play football at Yale University. He volunteered to join the Navy Air Corps during WWII. He was described in the newspaper as a brilliant football player. Subsequently, he was transferred to Yale University where he obtained a bachelor's degree in political science in 1949.

During his college years, he was present in the crash of a DC-6 airplane that had been contracted by Yale University to bring students back to school after Christmas break. The airplane was overloaded, crashing at takeoff, killing 14 students. Roderick was one of three survivors, whose mother came to the scene of the accident, where she found him crying, dazed, and in a state of shock, while he was identifying his dead classmates.

== Adult life and higher education ==
Following graduation, he moved to Michigan, then San Francisco, but shortly after, he went to Alaska looking to make money. He found a job at a cannery located on Afognak Island, near Kodiak Island. He decided to remain in Alaska permanently by 1954. During one of his trips, he met Martha Brady Martin and married her in 1955. They were married until her death in 2008, and had two daughters, Libby and Selah.

Roderick furthered his education by attending the University of Washington, School of Law, graduating with a J.D. in 1959. After twenty years of working and raising a family, he decided to return to school, attending Harvard Kennedy School at Harvard University, where he obtained an M.P.A. (1981).

Jack Roderick died at his home in Anchorage on October 19, 2020, at the age of 94. Family and friends gathered at his house in Anchorage to find out the status of his health. During his last days, shortly before the 2020 elections, he encouraged people to vote, and many admirers that came to his home to say goodbye and thanked him for his contributions to the community.

== Civic leadership ==
Jack Roderick contributed significantly to the civic life of Alaska. As a young adventurous individual in need of money to support his growing family, he drove a truck as a Teamster, a member of the international brotherhood that began in the early 1900. He delivered goods and milk to the North Slope, and in one of those trips he had the idea of starting an oil scouting business called Alaska Scouting Service, later turning it into an enterprise of many businesses: Alaska Abstract Service, Petroleum Publications, Inc., Alaska Petroleum Directory, Alaska Map Service, Van Cleve Printing Company, Alaska Industry magazine, Alaska Title Guaranty Company, Alaska Pacific Capital Corporation (SBIC), and oil exploration companies, Ivy, Inc. (oil & gas leasing). Later, in 1964, it turned into Alaska Exploration Corporation (geological, leasing and exploration). Another of his many accomplishments was Deputy commissioner of State Department of Natural Resources from 1976 to 1978, followed by a position as Alaska Director of US Farmers' Home Administration in 1978.

Roderick began his law practice, opening a law firm called Stevens and Roderick (1961–63). After Senator Ted Stevens was appointed to work in Washington DC, the firm became Holland and Roderick (1969–70). During the years 1967–68, Jack Roderick lived abroad with his daughters, Libby and Sarah, and his wife Martha, as a Regional Director of the U.S Peace Corps based in India. Then in 1971–72, he served as a Public Affairs Consultant for Alyeska Pipeline.

Roderick became Mayor of the Borough of Anchorage (1972–75). His campaign was managed by his brother David Roderick. During his public service as a mayor of Anchorage, he founded the public transit "People Mover" system, community schools, and The Anchorage Federation of Community Councils. The Community Councils proved to be the contribution that made him the must proud, because it gave to each neighborhood a voice in the issues and decisions of the town. He encouraged local residents to participate in council and assembly meetings, and through civic engagement, he helped to establish Anchorage Trail Systems.

After attending Harvard Kennedy School, he became the Alaska State Energy Director, a member of the Oil and Gas Royalty Development Advisory Board in 1984–85. He became Chairman of the Alaska Democratic Party from1985-88. In 1980–81, he began to research information to write his book Crude Dreams: A Personal History of Oil and Politics in Alaska that was finished and published by Epicenter Press in 1997. In 1997, during the administration of President Bill Clinton, there was news about the possible nomination of Jack Roderick as a member of the Arctic Research Commission.

Roderick shared his life experience and expertise in business law as an adjunct professor at the University of Alaska Anchorage, and as an instructor teaching about Alaska's Oil Industry at the Alaska Pacific University. He became part of the Chancellor's Advisory Board at UAA and also UAA's College of Fellows.

== Legacy ==
One day, during lunch at his house with his wife, Martha, and his brother, tired of listening to him about how wrong the officials were going about helping the community, his wife asked him to run for Mayor in the election he eventually won. Roderick's biggest legacy to the community of Anchorage was the Community Council, which has become the Anchorage Federation of Community Councils. The Community Council idea was taken from a mayor in the state of Oregon. He served as a mayor of Anchorage from 1972 to 1975, managing a budget of $100 million and had 2,000 employees in a city of 175,000 people.
