= Tour of Anchorage =

Alaskan ski race

The Tour of Anchorage is a point-to-point cross-country ski race held annually on the first Sunday in March in Anchorage, Alaska. Established in 1989, it is part of the American Ski Marathon Series.

== Course ==
The race includes three distances of 50 km, 40km, and 25km, each with a freestyle and classic option. The 50km and 40 km races begin at Service High School, while the 25 km race begins at Alaska Pacific University. All races end in the stadium at Kincaid Park, except in 2021, Kincaid Stadium.

Strict measures were undertaken in 2021, such as athletes to wear masks & social distancing from others.
