= Charles Christian Georgeson =

Danish-American agronomist

Charles Christian Georgeson (/ˈdʒɔːrdʒɪsən/ JOR-jiss-ən; June 26, 1851 – 1931) was a Danish-American agronomist.

== Biography ==
Georgeson was born in Langeland, Denmark and immigrated to the United States in 1873 to attend college, graduating from Michigan State College in 1878. He received his master's degree in 1882 and a doctorate in 1916, both from Michigan State.

From the beginning of 1886 to near the close of 1889, he was Professor of Agriculture at Tokyo Imperial University in Tokyo, Japan, in the College of Agriculture and Dendrology. On his return to the United States, he was appointed Professor of Agriculture and superintendent of the farm at Kansas State University. In 1898, Georgeson was appointed Special Agent in Charge of the US agricultural experiment stations and sent to Alaska. He remained in Alaska, developing the region's agriculture, until retiring in 1927. Georgeson died in 1931 in Seattle, Washington.

He was well respected as a plant breeder and agronomist and developed the Sitka hybrid strawberry. The Georgeson Botanical Garden is named in his honor. Georgeson was also associate editor of the Rural New Yorker from 1878 to 1880.
