= David Roderick (politician) =

American politician (1921–2007)

Member of the Washington House of Representatives from the 35th district
- In office 1948–1952

Personal details
- Born: October 29, 1921 Frederick, Maryland, U.S.
- Died: December 4, 2007 (aged 86) Seattle, Washington, U.S.
- Party: Democratic
- Spouses: Jean (m. 1948; div. 1958); Marcia (m. 1961; div. 1974)
- Relations: Jack Roderick (brother)
- Children: 5, including John
- Education: University of Washington (undergrad and JD)
- Profession: Attorney

Military service
- Branch/service: U.S. Navy
- Years of service: 1943–1945

David Roderick (October 29, 1921 – December 4, 2007) was an American lawyer and Democratic politician who served in the Washington House of Representatives from 1948 to 1952.

== Early life ==
Born in Frederick, Maryland, Roderick moved with his family at a young age to Seattle, Washington. He attended Broadway Central High School, where he was friends with many students who became victims of the internment of Japanese Americans. Roderick fought in World War II as a U.S. Navy pilot in the Pacific Theater, and then returned home to Washington, where he graduated from the University of Washington in 1947.

== Politics ==
In 1948, Roderick successfully ran for the Washington House of Representatives as a Democrat, and served two terms while also attending the University of Washington Law School. While in law school, he became friends with future federal judge Jack Edward Tanner. During and after his stint in the legislature, he was active in the labor and civil rights movements. Roderick worked as a labor arbitrator on the Seattle waterfront, and marched with Martin Luther King Jr. for African-American voting rights in 1960. In 1960, Roderick worked for the presidential campaign of John F. Kennedy. He moved to Kingston, Washington, and ran for the legislature again during the 1968 elections, but was defeated by the Republican candidate.

== Later life ==
Roderick moved to Anchorage, Alaska, in 1971, where he was the campaign manager for his brother John "Jack" Roderick's successful run for mayor of Anchorage in 1974. He worked as an attorney in Alaska until his retirement in 1995, when he returned to Tacoma, Washington.

== Personal life ==
Roderick married his first wife, Jean, in 1948, and they had three children; the couple divorced in 1958. He remarried in 1961 to Marcia, and the marriage led to two additional children, Susan and John Roderick, who became a noted musician and podcaster. David and Marcia Roderick divorced in 1974.

After a series of strokes, Roderick died from respiratory failure in Seattle on December 4, 2007, at the age of 86.
