= Point Woronzof Park =

Park in Anchorage, Alaska, U.S.

Coordinates: 61.186°N 150.021°W

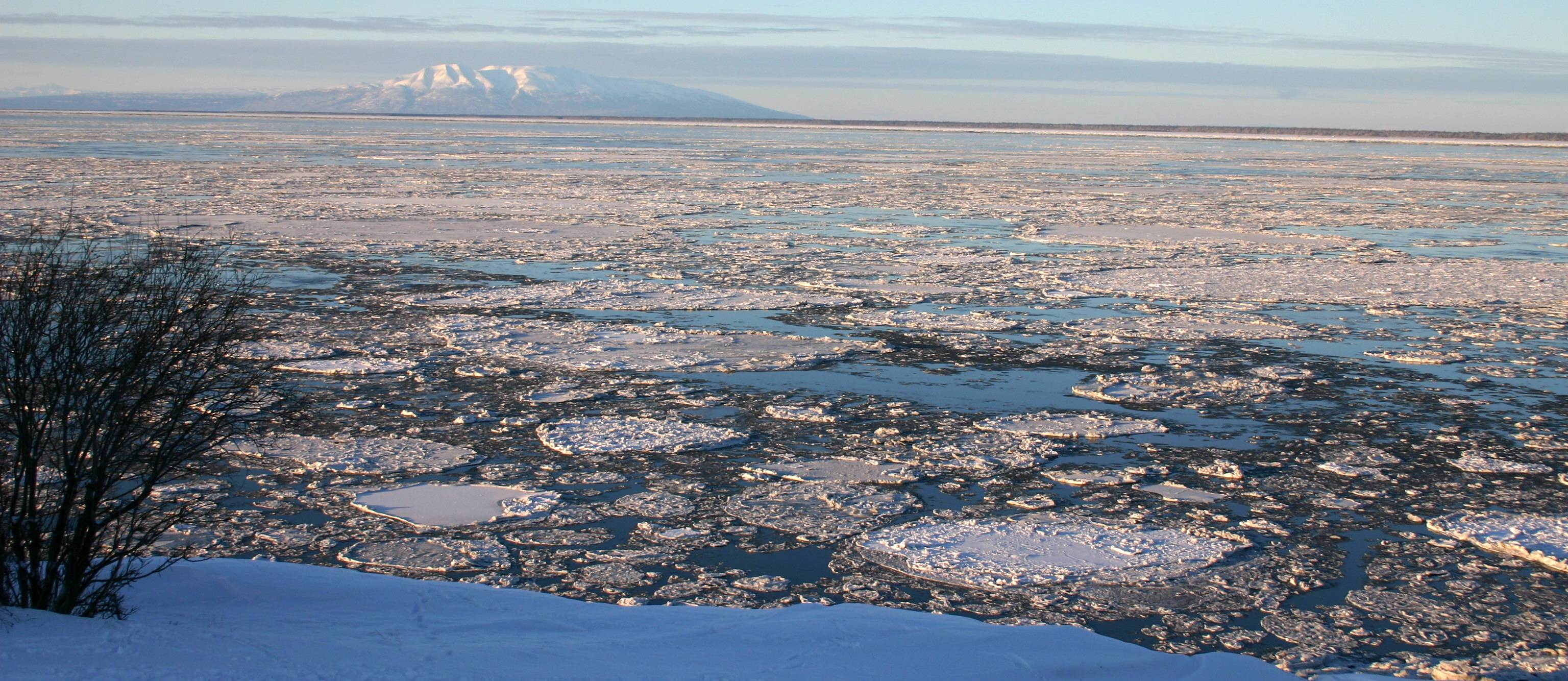
View from Point Woronzof in 2008

Point Woronzof Park is a municipal park in Anchorage, Alaska known for its views of Denali. The park is excellent for backcountry skiing or snowshoeing in the winter, and hiking or running in the summer.

The park is home to flora and fauna similar to its larger neighbor, Kincaid Park, which is accessible several kilometers down the Tony Knowles Coastal Trail. Fox, coyote, snowshoe hare, lynx, and many moose are known to inhabit the park. Trees are mostly birch (especially on the hills), spruce, cottonwood, and alder. Devil's Club and elderberry are endemic.

This 191.7-acre (0.776 km^{2}) park is located next to the Knik Arm of Cook Inlet, between Point Woronzof and Point Campbell, the latter of which is located in nearby Kincaid Park. The park is bounded on the west by the ocean, along which the Tony Knowles Coastal Trail runs, the north by municipal lands associated with the sewage treatment plant, the east by airport land, and the south by Heritage Land Bank lands and airport lands. In addition, a Phillips gas pipeline right-of-way crosses the park near its southern end. Point Woronzof is not located within Point Woronzof Park but about 1 mile to the north.
