= Far North Bicentennial Park =

Coordinates: 61.158°N 149.761°W

The Far North Bicentennial Park is the largest park in Anchorage, in U.S. state of Alaska, and has over 1 million annual visitors. The park contains the Hilltop Ski Area, the Alaska Botanical Garden, over 100 miles of multi-use trails, and access to Chugach State Park.

In 2018 a rodeo cow escaped into the park. The cow has not been recovered but has been spotted by park visitors.
