= Hilltop Ski Area =

Ski area in Alaska, United States

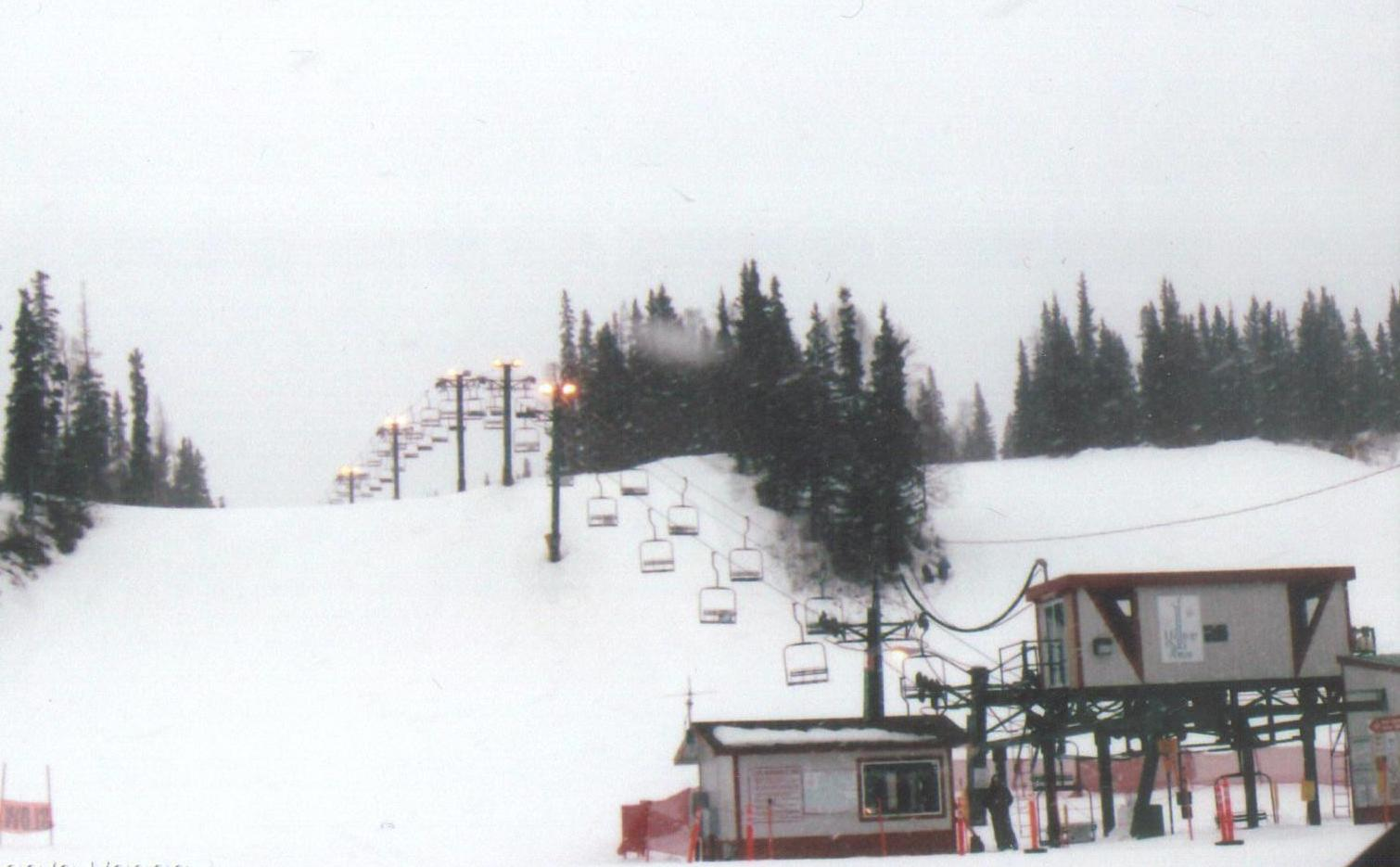

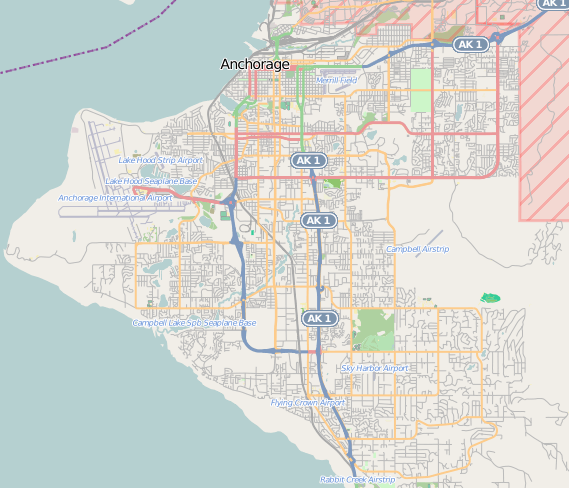
- Location in Anchorage, Alaska Hilltop Ski Area (Alaska) Hilltop Ski Area (North America)
- Location: Anchorage, Alaska, US
- Coordinates: 61°08′27″N 149°44′42″W
- Vertical: 294 ft (90 m)
- Skiable area: 30 acres (120,000 m^{2})
- Trails: 5 or 6
- Longest run: 2,090 ft (640 m)
- Lift system: 1 chair, 1 rope tow, 1 platter lift
- Website: Hilltop Ski Area

Hilltop Ski Area is a ski area in Anchorage, Alaska, established in 1984. Located in Far North Bicentennial Park near Chugach State Park at the base of the Chugach Mountains, Hilltop Ski Area is owned and operated by Youth Exploring Adventure, Inc., an Anchorage nonprofit 501(c)(3) organization established in 1979 to provide recreational programs for Anchorage youth.

== Facilities ==
Hilltop has a triple Riblet chairlift, a rope tow, a platter lift, and 30 acres (120,000 m^{2}) groomed ranging in difficulty level from easy (80%) to more difficult (10%) to most difficult (10%). Adjacent facilities include the Karl Eid Ski Jump Complex, with 15 meter, 40 meter, and 60 meter jumps (all lighted); Hillside Park with 7.5 miles (12 km) of trails suitable for Nordic skiing; and Bicentennial Park with 20 miles (32 km.) of trails suitable for Nordic skiing.

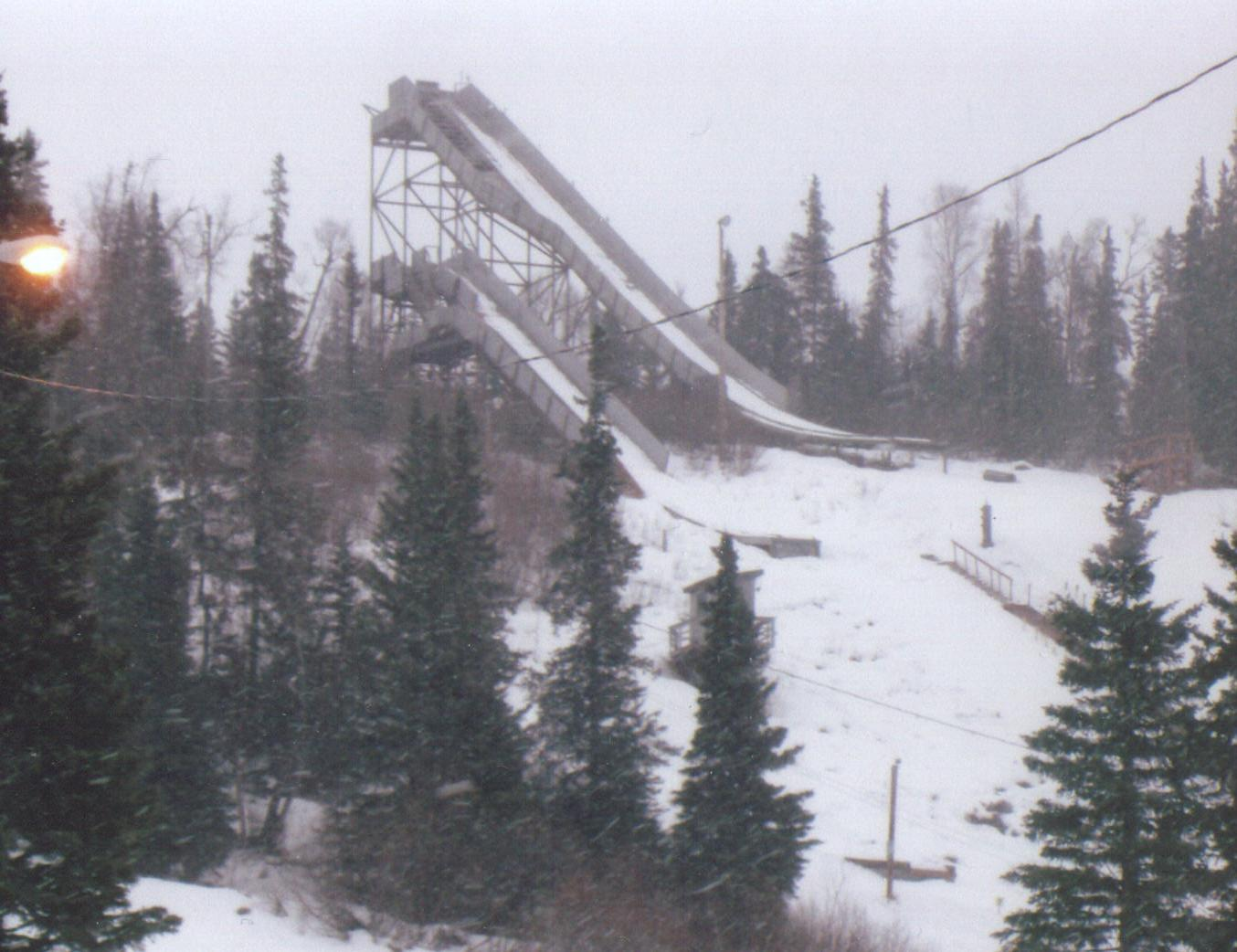
Karl Eid Ski Jump Complex

== Programs ==
Hilltop offers a ski school with group and private lessons in skiing and snowboarding for all people of all ages and ability levels, the after-school Hot Dogger Program for children aged 16 to 14, and Alpine Alternatives, which offers skiing instruction to people with disabilities. Additionally, the area is home to the Hilltop Alpine Racing Team (HART) which offers race training for ages 6–19. Hilltop's instructors are members of the Professional Ski Instructors of America. Hilltop offers ski and snowboard camps during Anchorage School District in-service days (scheduled teacher/staff training days that students get as days off), the December holiday season, and spring break.

== History ==
The nonprofit corporation Hilltop Youth, Inc. was established in Anchorage in the 1950s with a focus on providing recreational and educational opportunities for Anchorage-area youth. In 1962, Hilltop Youth installed a rope tow powered by a surplus military troop carrier motor in a gravel pit west of what is now known as Old Seward Highway. The rope tow was moved in 1967 to a new location near the intersection of the newly constructed roads Abbott Road and Hillside Drive. In the early 1980s a 10-meter jump for novices designed by Karl Eid was also built on this site. This site, the original Hilltop Ski area, was in operation from 1967 to 1983, when the Hilltop Ski area was moved to its current location about half a mile north of the original site. Since its establishment in its current location in 1984, Hilltop Ski Area has been operated by Youth Exploring Adventure, Inc.

In the early 1980s, operators of the "old" Hilltop replaced the rope tow engine, rope, and motor shack through a grant from the State of Alaska. The current Hilltop Ski Area still uses this equipment on its beginners' slope.
