= Kincaid Park =

Municipal park in Anchorage, Alaska

Coordinates: 61°09′15″N 150°03′20″W

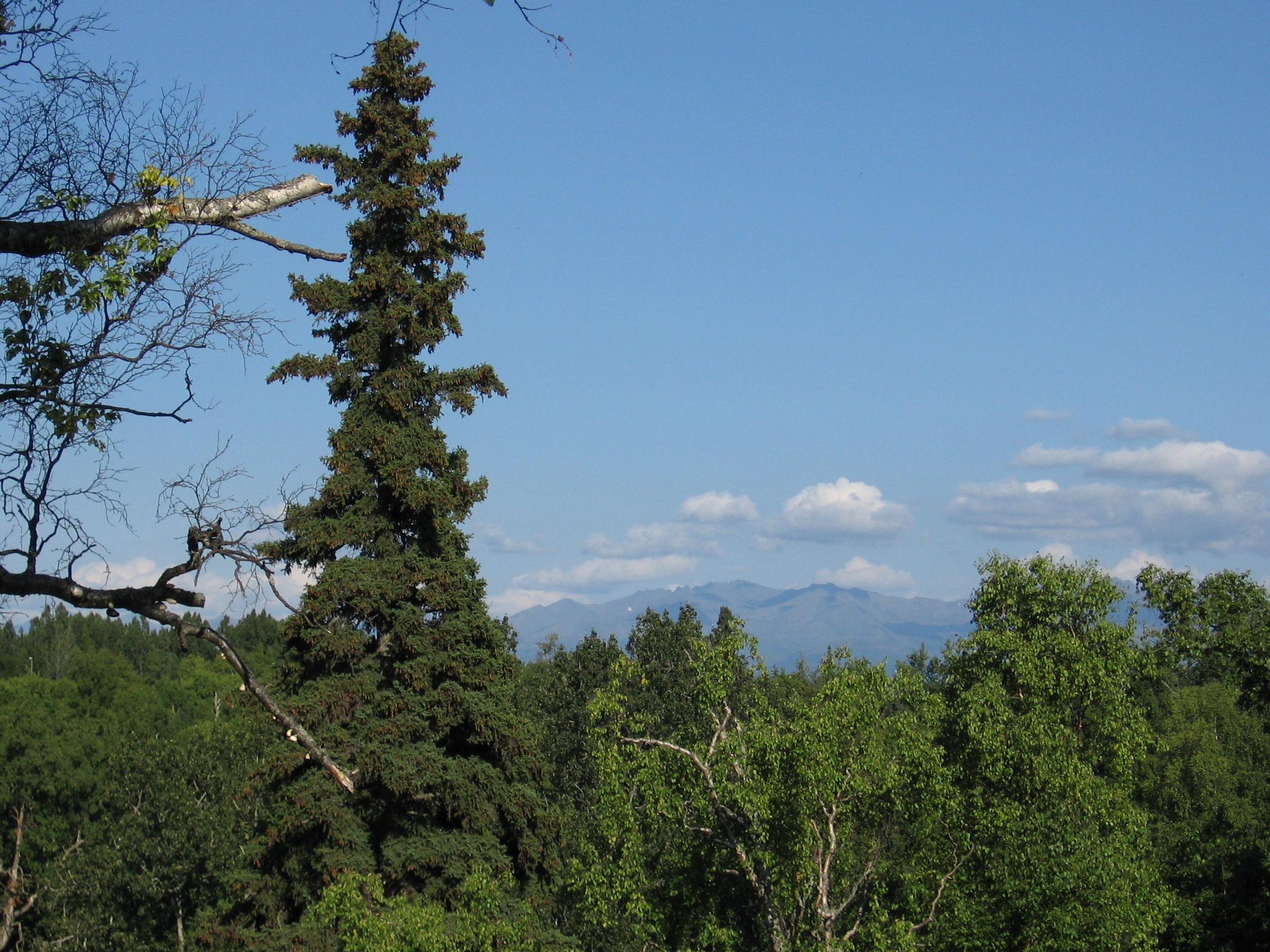
View across Cook Inlet

Kincaid Park is a 1,516.78-acre (6.1382 km^{2}) municipal park in Anchorage, Alaska, located at 9401 W. Raspberry Road. The park is bounded on the south by Turnagain Arm, on the west by Knik Arm, and on the north by Ted Stevens Anchorage International Airport. Noted for Nordic skiing trails, in snowless months the park is frequented by runners, cyclists, hikers, archers, dog-trainers, motocross users, disc golfers, soccer teams, and rollerskiers. Other winter activities include snowshoeing, sledding and biathlon. The park was created in 1978 and later expanded to include the location of a deactivated former Nike missile site. The park continues to evolve with changing demands of local residents. In 2009, a full 18 "hole" disc golf course that meanders through the wooded Mize Loop area was completed. In 2010, several new soccer fields were completed and open for use in the area near the chalet. In 2012, a single artificial turf soccer field with stadium seating was completed just south of the park's headquarters building, Kincaid Chalet. Cook Inlet, Fire Island with its wind turbines, and Mount Susitna are visible from most hilltops in the park. On a clear day, Denali can also be seen from the park.

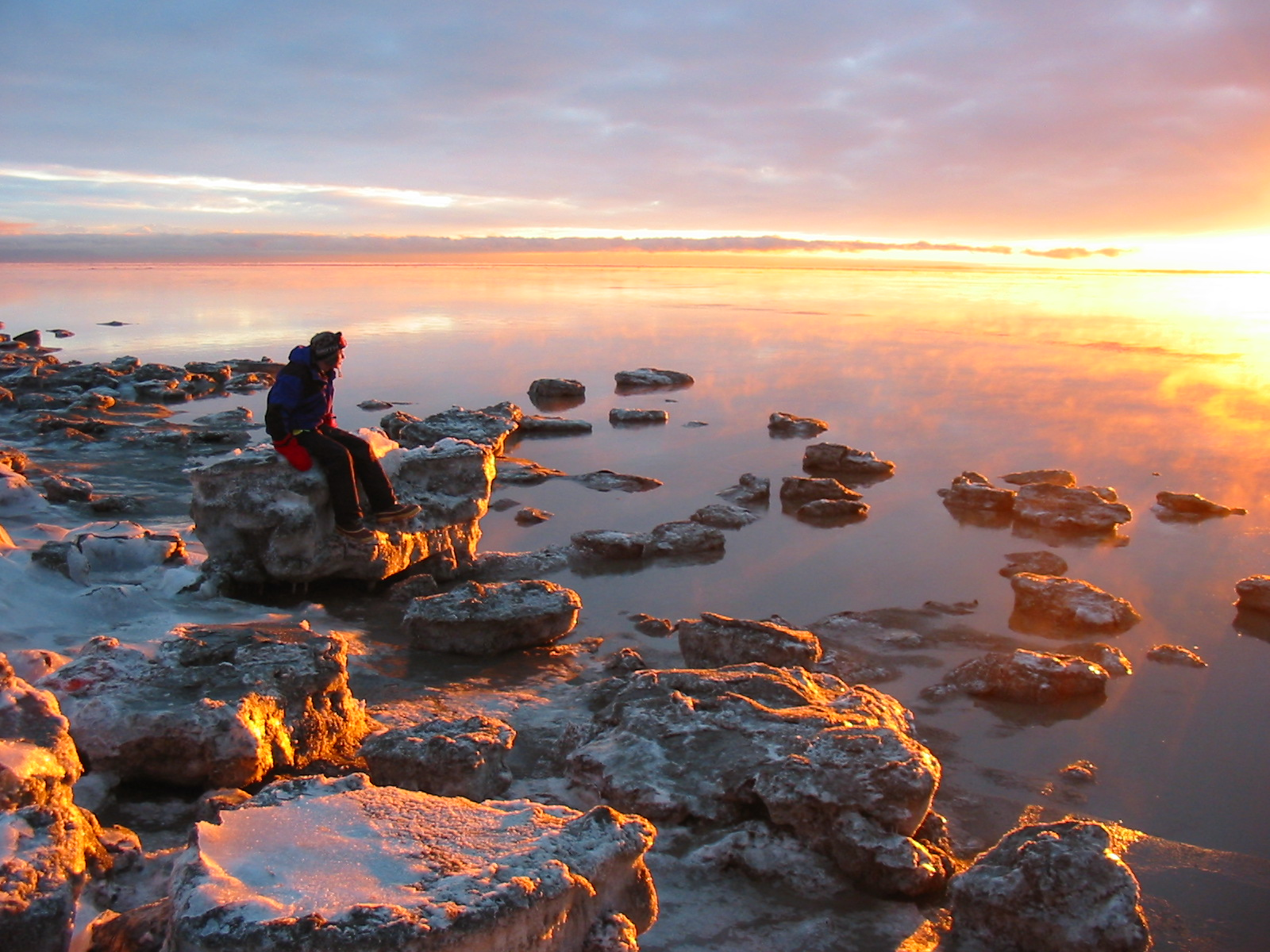
The Kincaid beach in winter

The park gates are open seven days a week from 7:30am until 10:00pm. The chalet is open seven days a week from 12:30pm until 8:00pm. The chalet has three rooms that can be rented to the public for weddings, birthdays, baby showers and other special events. The Annex and different areas of the park may also be rented by the public.

The park is mostly forested, with birch, cottonwood, and spruce. Wildlife includes moose, lynx, bear, fox, eagles, porcupines, owls, and many others, with moose being the most commonly seen.

Little Campbell Lake offers ice-fishing in winter, boating and fishing in the summer. No camping or fires are allowed anywhere within the park.

In the southwest corner of Kincaid Park, by the Jodhpur road entrance, there is a motocross park and beside it a huge sand dune created by the winds that sweep in from Turnagain Arm periodically.

The Tony Knowles Coastal Trail connects Kincaid Park to downtown Anchorage and provides excellent biking or skiing. Within the park there are approximately 60 kilometers of cross country ski trails, which are also used by hikers and cyclists in the summer, and about 27 kilometers of new single track biking trails.

== History ==
The area now designated as Kincaid Park, along with nearby Fire Island in Cook Inlet was withdrawn from Chugach National Forest in 1915 and established as the Point Campbell Military Reservation. A submarine observation post occupied Fire Island during World War II. From 1959-1979 the reservation was primarily occupied by a Nike-Hercules surface-to-air missile battery, Site Point. Following the decommissioning of the site, the reservation was conveyed, in several different stages, to the Municipality of Anchorage. Several of the former military structures were repurposed and in use, including Kincaid Chalet and several storage facilities.

Kincaid Park, adjacent airport lands maintained as woodland, and nearby Point Woronzof Park (191.7 acres) offer the best semi-wilderness experiences closest to West and Downtown Anchorage.
