= Lemon Creek =

Lemon Creek can refer to:

- Lemon Creek, British Columbia, Canada, a village in the Slocan Valley
- Lemon Creek, Juneau, Alaska, USA, a neighborhood, noted for its state prison
- Lemon Creek (Alaska), USA, a waterway
- Lemon Creek (St. Joseph River tributary), a stream in Michigan
- Lemon Creek (Staten Island), New York, a stream
