= 1997 Bethel Regional High School shooting =

Mass shooting in Bethel, Alaska

- Location of Bethel Regional High School (Alaska)
- Location: 60.8021°N 161.7705°W; Bethel, Alaska, U.S.
- Date: February 19, 1997
- Target: Students and staff at Bethel Regional High School
- Attack type: School shooting, mass shooting
- Weapon: Mossberg 500 12-gauge shotgun
- Deaths: 2
- Injuries: 2
- Perpetrator: Evan Ramsey
- Motive: Retaliation for school bullying; Psychological trauma

On February 19, 1997, a school shooting occurred at Bethel Regional High School in Bethel, Alaska. Two people, including the school principal, were killed and two others were injured before the perpetrator, 16-year-old student Evan Ramsey, surrendered to police.

== Prior events ==
Reports say in the two weeks before the incident, more than 15 students knew of Ramsey's intention to commit a school shooting, and two assisted him. One student, James Randall, taught him how to load and fire a shotgun. Another student, Matthew Charles, told him of the infamy that would come. Reports say that several students brought cameras to school on the day of the shooting and that many students were watching the shooting from a library balcony overlooking the student commons area.

== Shooting ==
On February 19, 1997, Ramsey armed himself with a Mossberg 500 12-gauge shotgun and arrived at Bethel Regional High School by school bus. He approached the student commons area, brandishing the shotgun, and shot 15-year-old Josh Palacios, who had argued and fought with Ramsey two years prior, in the abdomen. Palacios later died after emergency surgery. The same shotgun blast wounded two other students. Reyne Athanas, an art teacher, entered the commons area after hearing the gunshots, and saw Ramsey firing at the ceiling. Athanas said she tried and failed to convince Ramsey to surrender. He then entered the main lobby, where he shot principal Ron Edwards twice; in the back and shoulder, killing him.

Ramsey then retreated to the commons area, shooting once at police. An officer returned fire, but Ramsey was uninjured. Ramsey later placed the shotgun barrel under his chin, but then reportedly said, "I don't want to die," laid the shotgun on the ground, and surrendered without further incident.

=== Motives ===
Ramsey was believed to be frequently bullied at school. According to his friends, Ramsey complained of being harassed and teased by other students, who he claimed only addressed him as "Screech", a character from the NBC TV series Saved by the Bell. In addition to being picked on by peers, Ramsey had a long history of abuse. His mother lived with a series of violent men who abused Ramsey and his brothers. He also was physically and sexually abused by an older boy in one of his foster homes.

== Perpetrator ==
Evan Ramsey
- Born: February 8, 1981 (age 45); Anchorage, Alaska, U.S.
- Status: Incarcerated; Eligible for parole in 2066
- Convictions: First degree murder (2 counts); Third degree assault (15 counts)
- Penalty: 210 years imprisonment; commuted to 198 years imprisonment

Evan Ramsey was born to Don and Carol Ramsey on February 8, 1981. When he was five years old, his father was imprisoned for ten years after a police standoff, and his mother developed alcoholism. Ramsey and his family soon after were forced to relocate to the Anchorage area after their house was set on fire. When he was seven, the Anchorage Department of Youth and Family Services removed Ramsey and his two brothers from his mother's custody and placed them in foster care. He was soon separated from his older brother and lived in eleven different foster homes in the three years between 1988 and 1991. Ramsey and his younger brother were allegedly abused by several foster parents. His younger brother claimed that their foster brothers would pay other children to beat Ramsey for their amusement.

At age 10, Ramsey and his brothers settled in Bethel, Alaska, with their foster mother, who later became their legal guardian. Ramsey suffered from depression since early childhood and attempted suicide when he was ten years old.

=== Family ===
Ramsey was not the first in his family to take a firearm into a public place. In October 1986, his father, Don Ramsey, went to the Anchorage Times newspaper office armed with an Armalite AR-18 rifle, a revolver, and more than 210 rounds of ammunition. While inside the building, Don Ramsey began taking hostages and was involved in a brief standoff with police until he surrendered. His motive was that he was angered that the Times refused to publish a political letter he had written. He was sentenced to 10 years in prison and was paroled several weeks before his son perpetrated the school shooting.

A week before the school shooting, Ramsey's older brother was arrested for armed robbery.

== Aftermath ==
Following his arrest, Ramsey claimed he did not understand his actions would kill anyone. His trial was delayed as prosecutors discussed whether Ramsey should be tried as a juvenile or as an adult. Prosecutors decided to try Ramsey as an adult in Anchorage. On December 2, 1998, Ramsey was found guilty of two counts of first-degree murder, three counts of first-degree attempted murder, and fifteen counts of third-degree assault. Judge Mark Isaac Wood sentenced him to 210 years in prison. On appeal, his sentence was reduced to two 99-year prison sentences. He was initially imprisoned at the Spring Creek Correctional Center in Seward before being moved to the Wildwood Correctional Complex around 2017. He will be eligible for parole in 2066 when he is 85 years old.

Within the first 3 years of being a convict in prison, Ramsey gambled with another prisoner and won, after which the other prisoner owed Ramsey four candy bars. When the prisoner refused to pay his debt, Ramsey filled a sock with batteries and attacked the prisoner with it, which led to Ramsey being sent to Solitary confinement for a period of 6 months.

On February 15, 2006, Ramsey participated in an interview with Anderson Cooper titled In the Mind of a Killer, in which his father, Don Ramsey, blamed the video game Doom for the shooting. His crime was also profiled on the Court TV series Anatomy of a Crime. Ramsey's actions were also covered in the program Kids Who Kill which also featured interviews with Ramsey.

== See also ==
- List of school shootings in the United States by death toll
- List of school shootings in the United States (before 2000)
