= Knik Arm ferry =

Proposed ferry project across Knik Arm, Alaska

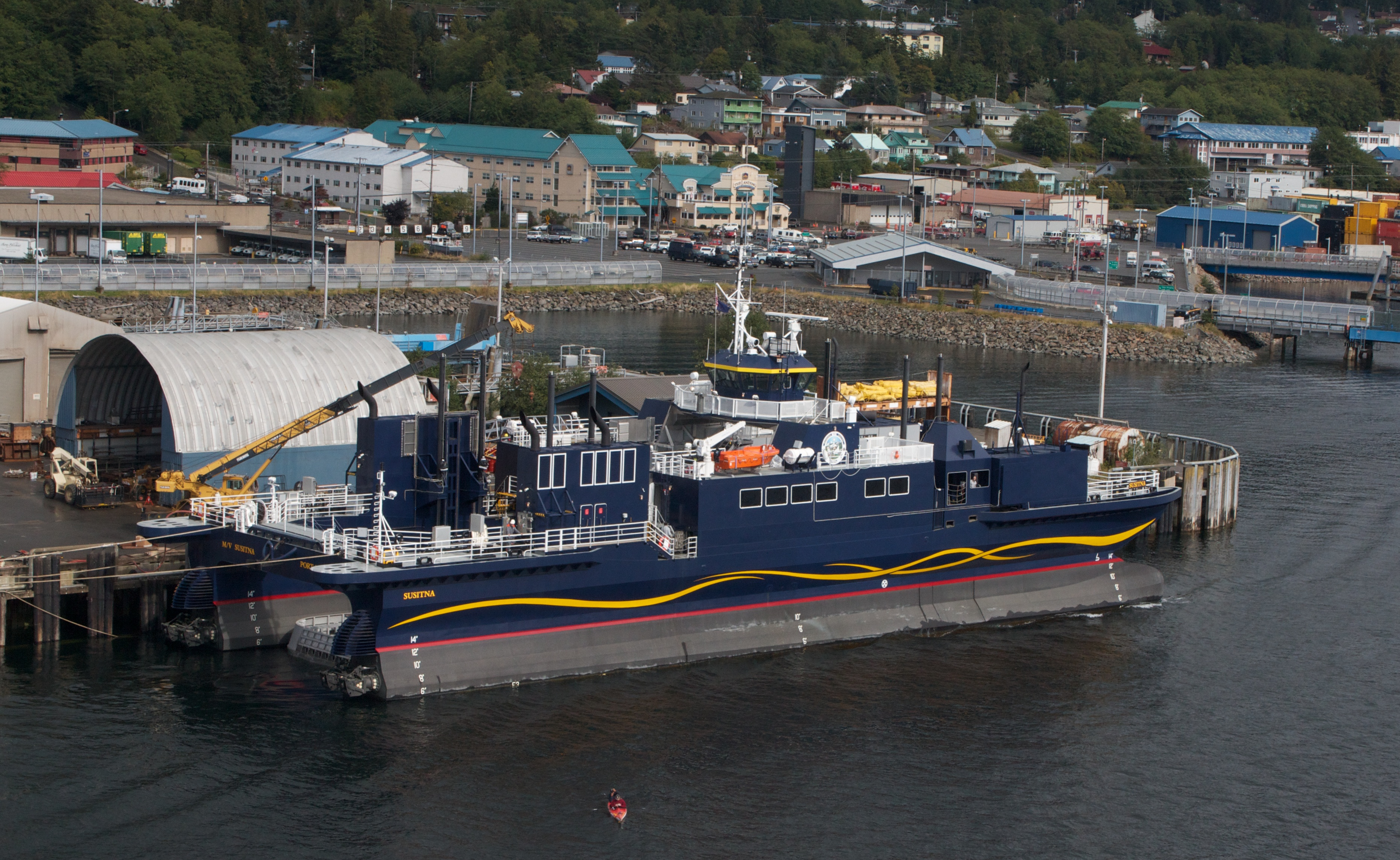
- MV Susitna being outfitted in Ketchikan for delivery to Anchorage.
- Locale: Alaska
- Waterway: Knik Arm
- Transit type: Ferry
- Began operation: Never began
- No. of lines: 1
- No. of vessels: 1 (planned)
- No. of terminals: 2 (planned)

Knik Arm ferry or Cook Inlet ferry, was a proposed year-round passenger and auto ferry across Knik Arm between Anchorage and Point MacKenzie in Alaska. The project was to use the MV Susitna SWATH / barge convertible expedition craft, which was built for US$80,000,000, to connect Alaska's financial center with the fastest growing community in Alaska, just two miles across water. No ferry landings were ever built, and the ship was never put into commission. Eventually, the Borough offered to either transfer the ferry for free to government entities in the U.S. in January 2013 or to sell the ship to a commercial interest. Sealed bids were taken through March 29, 2013. but the ship was not actually sold until 2016, for substantially below the cost of building it, just US$1.75 million

== MV Susitna ==
The ferry is a one-of-a-kind, ice-capable vessel that can transition from barge to twin-hulled ship, designed by Guido, Perla & Associates based on a concept by Lockheed-Martin Corporation for the Office of Naval Research as a half-sized prototype for a military vessel.

"It's an omnivore. It's not optimized for any one task, but it has a wide range of tasks it can do, and that's what makes it useful. It can work in deep seas, it can work in rough waters, it can break ice, it can work in shallow waters and go up to the beach. There's no other ship in the world that can do that."

— Lew Madden, Susitna Co-inventor

Susitna was built by Alaska Ship and Drydock, Inc., in Ketchikan. Design and construction costs were funded by the United States Navy Office of Naval Research to study the technology for its potential as a new type of expeditionary landing craft, also called an "E-craft". Basic construction of the ferry was completed and she was christened MV Susitna in June 2010, but it was never put into service.

The vessel is 59 metres (193 ft 7 in) long and has a capacity is 129 passengers and 20 automobiles. Her design incorporates lift technology that allows changing from the Small Waterplane Area Twin Hull (SWATH) mode to barge mode by lowering or raising her center deck. She is the world's first ice-capable twin-hulled vessel; and the world's first ship able to convert between a high-speed SWATH hull to a shallow barge-type.

== Timeline ==
A ferry in the area was proposed as early as 1999. Susitna was a project of Senator Ted Stevens, who helped secure numerous earmarks through Defense Department budgets to pay for the ship. Rather than toss the ship in a scrap heap as all other prototypes were, the ship was to be put to work as both a ferry for taxpayers, and as a research vessel for the U.S. Navy. The navy would gather information via the 1,000 sensors on board to learn how the stresses of ice affect the ship, helping the navy construct an improved landing craft for icy seas.

As of February 2013, the ferry was still docked at Ward Cove in Ketchikan, hundreds of miles from Knik Arm. In 2008 then mayor of the Municipality of Anchorage, Mark Begich, terminated the 2002 agreement with the Matanuska-Susitna Borough, which then bore sole responsibility for the project. Several landing sites were proposed, and each time there were objections. One site could possibly interfere with the endangered Beluga whale population in Cook Inlet. Another was deemed too close to the oil "tank farm" at the Port of Anchorage and was rejected out of security concerns. A third site was objected to by commercial fishermen, who feared it would interfere with their operations. Another site was rejected because the ferry required additional clearance. The borough favored a site at Ship Creek, an industrial area already used for offshore docking of tugboats, however, offloading of vehicles requires a ferry landing. No landings were ever built.

In August 2011, the borough government was informed that they were expected to take possession of the ship within a month. Even though the vessel would not be in service, the Matanuska-Susitna borough would be required to provide berthing fees and other expenses, which was an estimated annual cost of 1.3 million dollars. Concerned with taxpayers paying for maintenance and operations costs on a ship that had no revenue, the Matanuska-Susitna Borough Assembly agreed to either transfer the vessel to any U.S. government entity or sell it to a commercial interest. They were informed that if they sold it outright, they would need to return Federal grant funds used for its construction. The amount is uncertain. Or if the borough transferred the ship to another government entity, the financial obligation could have been reduced.

In January 2012, the Alaska Marine Highway rejected a proposal that they utilize the ship as it is not compatible with their existing facilities or training. A proposal to lease the vessel to the Coast Guard was rejected by that agency on similar grounds. The unused vessel was listed for sale in September 2012.

In May 2013, the borough agreed to sell the vessel to a private company for $6 million, a small fraction of its worth but enough to cover their obligations related to it. However, the buyers did not remit a promised down payment on schedule.

== Sale to the Philippine Red Cross ==
In September 2015, a deal was brokered with the Philippine Red Cross to purchase the ferry. The arrangement required that the ship first be repaired as three of its four engines were damaged by neglect and exposure during the time it had been stored without being used.

In December 2016, MV Susitna arrived at Subic Bay in the Philippines for turnover to the PRC which purchased the vessel, with help from the International Federation of Red Cross and Red Crescent Societies, British Red Cross, German Red Cross, Japanese Red Cross, and American Red Cross, for US$1.75 million from Matanuska-Susitna Borough. As part of the organization's 70th anniversary activities in 2017, a contest was initiated to rename Susitna where, in the end, it became known as MV Amazing Grace. Considered as the country's first humanitarian vessel, it was commissioned the same year in the presence of Philippine president Rodrigo Duterte. Its first deployment was on 2020 as part of PRC's disaster relief operations in the Philippine province of Catanduanes after being ravaged by Typhoon Rolly (Goni).
