= John Lemon (prospector) =

John Lemon was a prospector in the U.S. state of Alaska. In 1879, Lemon operated a placer mine with James Hollywood in what was the District of Alaska. Lemon and Hollywood mined for gold in what would later be named Lemon Creek. In the same year, Lemon and Hollywood also worked in Silver Bay. In 1880, Lemon was in the Cassiar Mountains. He traveled to Sitka, Alaska early in the year, where he joined the Edmund Bean party, and in the summer of 1880 helped blaze a trail over Chilkoot Pass to the headwaters of the Yukon River. The area in which Lemon mined has since been incorporated into modern day Juneau, Alaska.

== Legacy ==
Several natural landmarks, at least one structure and the neighborhood that grew around the site of his placer mine in present-day Juneau have been named for John Lemon. They include:

- Lemon Creek, Alaska, a mixed use neighborhood in Juneau, surrounding both banks of its namesake Lemon Creek.
- Lemon Creek, a watershed on which John Lemon prospected, and operated a placer mine. The creek is filled by meltwater from local glaciers.
- Lemon Creek Glacier, the primary source of water feeding Lemon Creek.
- Lemon Creek Correctional Center, an Alaska state prison located adjacent to Lemon Creek.
