= Death of Kent Leppink =

Fisherman killed in Alaska in 1996

Kent Leppink was a fisherman who was killed in Hope, Alaska, in May 1996. His former fiancée, Mechele Linehan, and former roommate, John Carlin, were convicted of murdering him in 2007, but the judgments were reversed on appeal. Carlin died in prison in 2008 and Alaska prosecutors ultimately decided against indicting Linehan a second time.

== Kent Leppink's murder ==
Kent Leppink was a Michigan native who moved to Alaska to work as a fisherman. He met Linehan at a striptease club. Between 1994 and 1996, Linehan was romantically involved with Leppink and a man named John Carlin at the same time. For several months the three lived in the same house in Anchorage. On May 2, 1996, Leppink (age 36) was found dead in Hope, Alaska, with three .44 caliber Desert Eagle gunshot wounds. Linehan was arrested over 10 years later in October 2006 and convicted of his murder on October 22, 2007, but the verdict was overturned in February 2010.

== Trial and appeal ==
At trial, Linehan was accused of conspiring with John Carlin to kill Leppink. The government said that Linehan's motive was that she was the beneficiary of Leppink's $1 million life insurance policy. Leppink changed the beneficiary on the policy a few days before his death.

On October 22, 2007, Linehan was convicted of murder. On April 2, 2008, she was sentenced to 99 years and transferred to Hiland Mountain Correctional Center in Eagle River, Alaska. Carlin had also been convicted of murder in April 2007. He was found bludgeoned to death in his cell at the Spring Creek Correctional Center in Seward, Alaska, on October 27, 2008. His conviction was reversed on January 21, 2015. Because Carlin died while his case was under appeal, his estate was allowed to continue the appeal.

On February 5, 2010, the Alaska Court of Appeals overturned Linehan's conviction. The court concluded it was improper for the trial court to allow two pieces of evidence into the trial: testimony about the movie The Last Seduction, and a letter written by Leppink in the days before he died. The letter, which Leppink wrote to his parents, said Linehan, Carlin, or Scott Hilke were "probably" responsible if he died under "suspicious circumstances".

Until May 11, 2010, Linehan was incarcerated at Hiland Mountain Correctional Center. On April 28, 2010, a judge set a $250,000 appearance bond as a condition of her bail. On May 11, 2010, an east coast corporate executive, Brian C. Watt, from Chester Springs, Pennsylvania, donated the money necessary to release Linehan from prison, paying a $25,000 bail bondsman fee.

On December 13, 2011, Anchorage Superior Court Judge Philip Volland dismissed the murder indictment against Linehan. In his ruling, Volland wrote:

The Court of Appeals repeatedly stated that the "letter from the grave" "appreciably affected" the jury's verdict at Linehan's trial. If it did so at a trial where the evidence was contested, defense counsel present, and the jury given an even stronger limiting instruction on the use of the letter, this court cannot find that Betsy Leppink's repetition of Kent Leppink's accusatory statement in the letter was not a decisive factor in the grand jury's decision to indict. Therefore, the indictment should be dismissed.

On August 6, 2012, Alaska prosecutors announced they would not indict Linehan again.

== Media reporting ==
On July 27, 2008, Linehan's case was profiled on Dateline NBC. An update aired on May 22, 2009.

On January 29, 2009, Linehan's case was profiled on the Oxygen Network series Snapped.

Also in 2009, Linehan's case was profiled on the CBS series 48 Hours. The episode was named "Love and Death in Alaska".

Linehan's case was also profiled in 2009 as part of the E! network program, Fatal Beauty: 15 Most Notorious Women.

On January 22, 2018, Linehan's case was profiled on the Investigation Discovery series People Magazine Investigates, episode "Alaskan Temptress".

== Other sources ==
- Deadly Angel:The Bizarre True Story of Alaska's Killer Stripper by Fred Rosen, published by HarperCollins, cited via Google books, ISBN 0-06-173398-9, released June 2009.
- "Seduced by Evil" by Michael Fleeman, published by St. Martin's Press, ISBN 978-0-312-38176-9, published August 2011.
