= Knik Arm =

Waterway in Northwestern Gulf of Alaska

Coordinates: 61.2000°N 150.2167°W

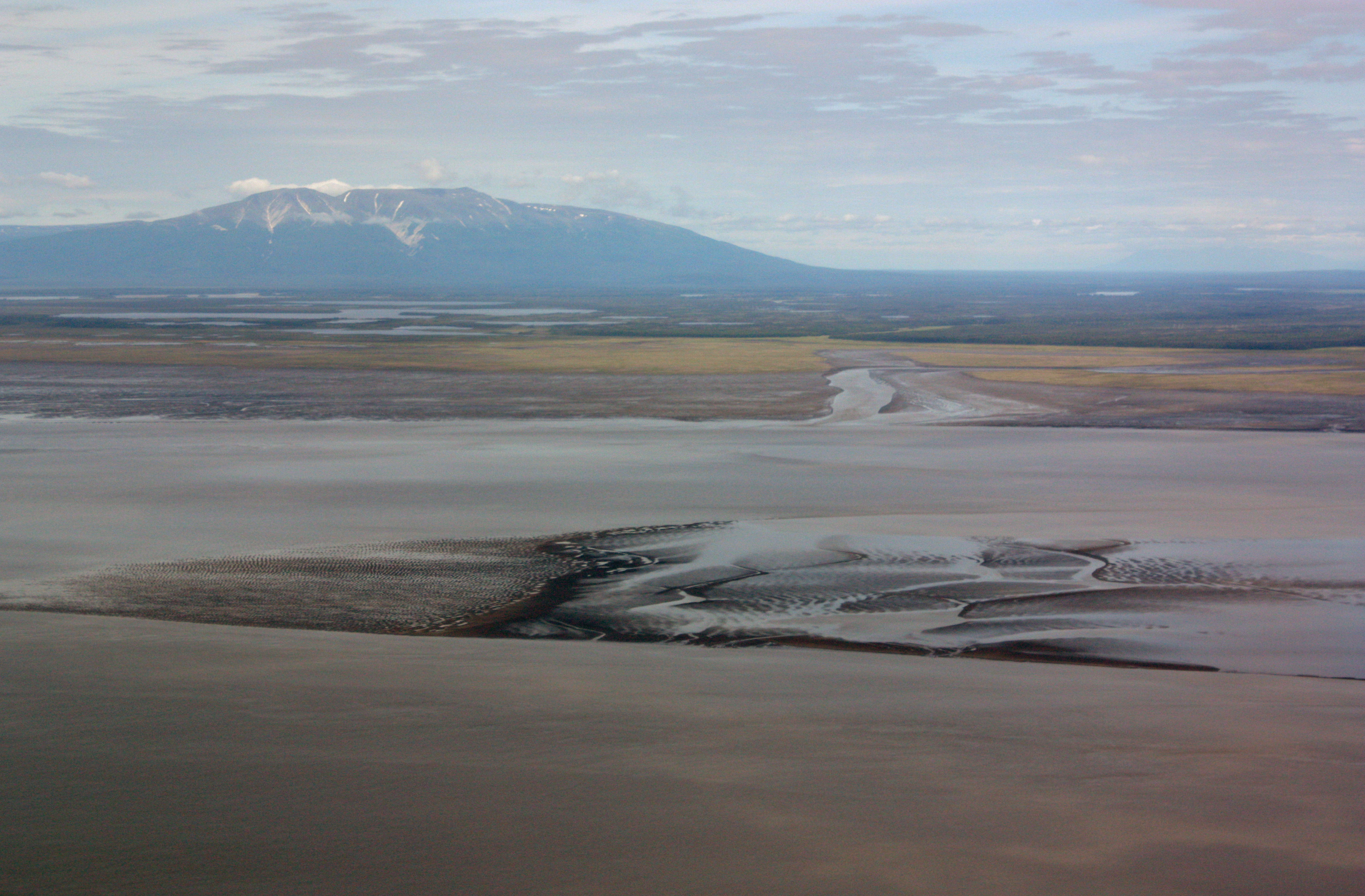
Mount Susitna (background); Susitna River Delta (middle distance); Knik Arm (foreground)

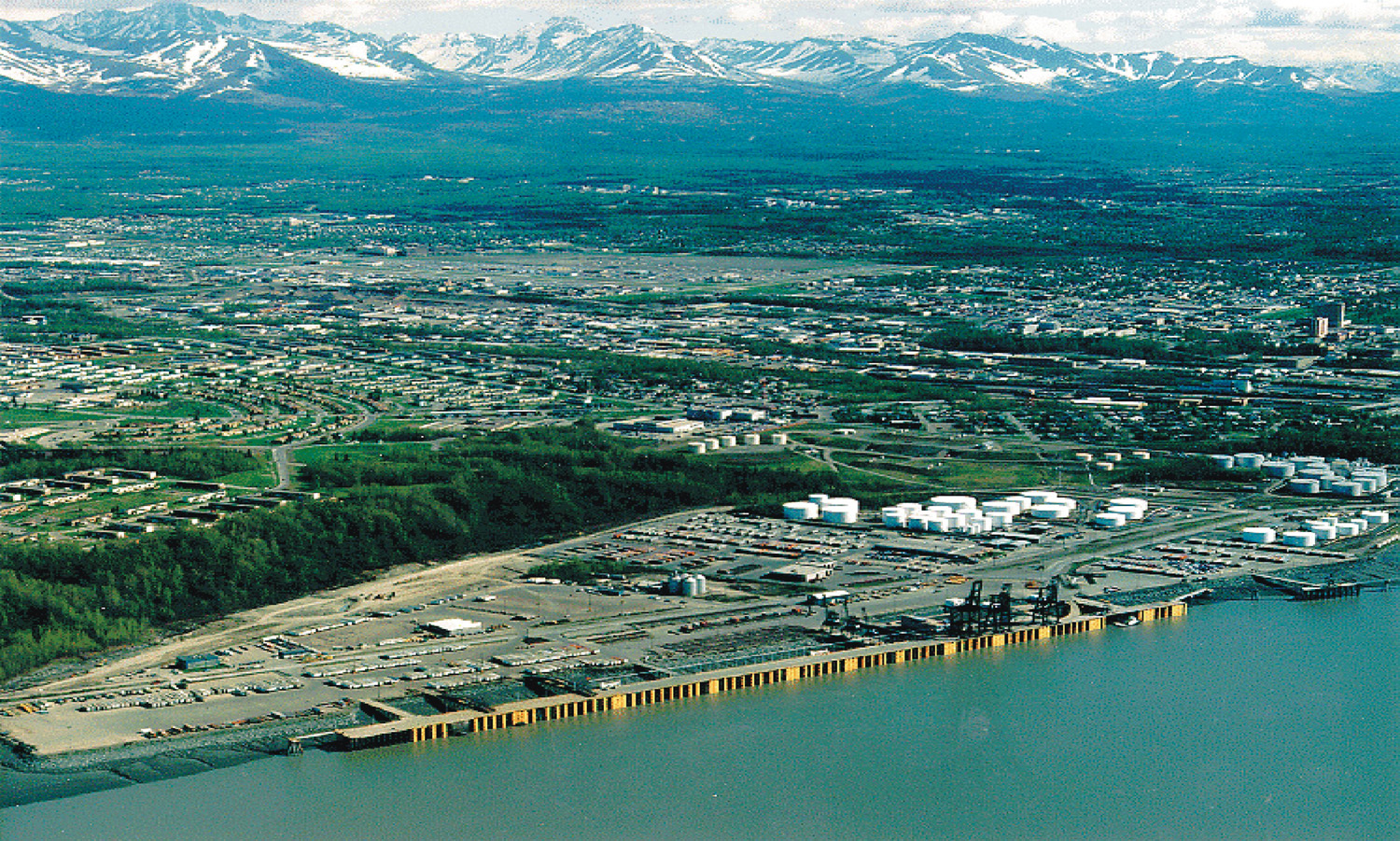
Port of Anchorage on Knik Arm

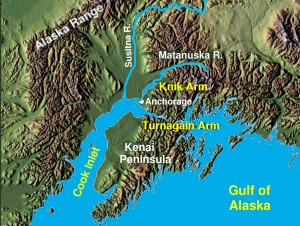
Cook Inlet with Knik and Turnagain arms

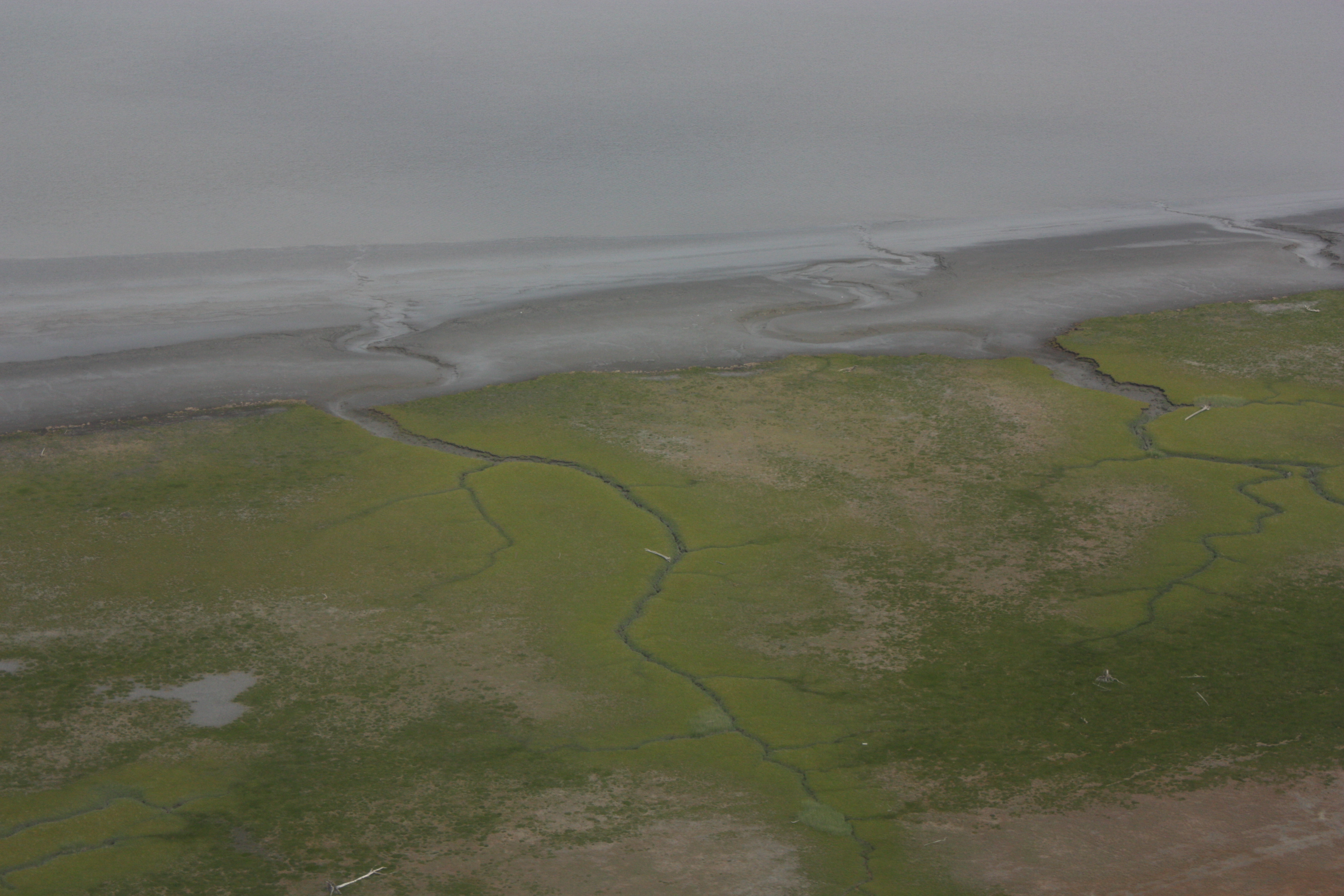
Mudflats on Knik Arm

Knik Arm (Dena'ina: Nuti) is a waterway into the northwestern part of the Gulf of Alaska. It is one of two narrow branches of Cook Inlet, the other being Turnagain Arm. Knik Glacier empties into the Knik Arm. The Port of Anchorage is located on the arm.

== Etymology ==
The Dena'ina name for Knik Arm is Nuti, meaning "salt water". The name "Knik" comes from igniq, the Iñupiaq word for "fire". It has been written Kinik, Kneep, Kneik, Kook, Knuyk, and Kweek.

== Geography ==
Knik Arm begins at the Inlet's northern edge, near Anchorage, before heading north and east. It is about 15 miles (24 km) long, and at its upper end, receives the waters of the Matanuska River. West of Knik Arm is the delta of the Susitna River, the largest stream emptying into the inlet. At the head of Knik Arm, at the mouth of Knik River, was the village (ghost town) of Knik. Knik Arm's other major tributaries are Ship Creek, Eagle River, Peter's Creek, Eklutna River and Fish Creek. The greater part of the plain, lying between the Knik Arm and the Susitna River, is drained by the Little Susitna. The upper part of Knik Arm merges into the delta of the Knik and Matanuska rivers, which unite just above tide limits.

== History ==
Knakatnuk and Nitak (or Nitakh) were historic native villages on the arm's shore. The 1964 Alaska earthquake destroyed or significantly damaged most of the Anchorage neighborhoods adjacent to the Arm, including the downtown area. The proposed Knik Arm Bridge would measure approximately 2 miles (3.2 km) from Point MacKenzie on the west in the Matanuska-Susitna Borough to Anchorage on the east. The Knik Arm ferry was a proposed year-round passenger and auto ferry across the arm which was to use the M/V Susitna SWATH / barge convertible expedition craft.
