= Lemon Creek, Juneau =

Neighborhood in Juneau, Alaska, U.S.

Coordinates: 58°21′30″N 134°29′55″W

Lemon Creek (Tlingit: Eix̱'gulhéen) is a neighborhood in Juneau, Alaska, United States. It is 5 miles (8 km) northwest of downtown Juneau. It is the site of the Lemon Creek Correctional Center. The neighborhood is bisected by the namesake Lemon Creek, which provides runoff for local glaciers.

The area is mixed use, and contains heavy concentrations of housing and industrial areas. An industrial park in the area includes Juneau's Costco and The Home Depot stores, as well as the Alaskan Brewing Company. Also in the neighborhood are the headquarters of both the Juneau Police Department and Alaska Electric Light & Power. The area is the location of the city's primary landfill, and city operated hazardous waste collection facility as well.

The Lemon name is said to come from traveling miner John Lemon, who reportedly had a placer mine on the creek in 1879.

== History ==
The Lemon Creek area is a fairly flat basin located at the confluence of the Gastineau Channel and Lemon Creek. A prospector by the name of John Lemon discovered gold in the creek in 1879 and established a placer mine claim that same year. Mr. Lemon referred to the creek as Lemon Creek, and the name endured. Most of the small-scale mining claims along the creek were bought out in 1900 by the Lemon Creek Company, which was located in New Jersey. The company began advertising for workers in Eastern U.S. newspapers. Early placer mining continued in the Lemon Creek area until 1905.

Logging, sawmill operations, and gravel mining were also part of the Lemon Creek area's early industries. A sawmill was located on the site currently occupied by Costco until the 1940s and logging continued in the Lemon Creek area until the 1980s. Gravel mining in the Lemon Creek area began during World War II and continues today.

Two of the first residents in the Lemon Creek area were homesteaders, Louie Lund and Charlie Switzer. Louie Lund began homesteading in the Lemon Creek area in 1908 near present-day Lund Street and operated the first transport company in Alaska. Beginning in 1922, Charlie Switzer owned a large dairy farm that was located between Switzer Creek and Fred Meyer. Switzer Creek and Switzer Mobile Home Park are named after him. With the advent of air services into Juneau beginning in the 1940s, dairy farming was no longer profitable and by 1965, the last of Juneau's dairy farms closed.

During the 1950s, developers began purchasing large parcels of land in the area, and it remained relatively rural until the 1960s. Although most of the homes were built in the 1970s, there are a few residences remaining that date to the early 1930s and 1940s. These older homes are found along Glacier Highway and on Sunny Point. Most of these historic buildings do not retain their historic character.

The Lemon Creek area has developed with a mixture of uses ranging from housing, dairy farms, and mining, and continues this pattern to the present day, serving as Juneau's hub for commercial and industrial activity as well as having many established residential neighborhoods: Pinewood Subdivision, Gruening Park, Eagles Edge Subdivision, Creekside Mobile Home Park, Switzer Village Mobile Home Park, and Churchill Mobile Home Park.

== Demographics ==
Historical population
Census	Pop.	Note	%±
1970	1,042		—
U.S. Decennial Census

Lemon Creek appeared once on the 1970 U.S. Census as an unincorporated village. It was merged into the city of Juneau the same year.
