= Robert Hansen =

American serial killer (1938–2014)

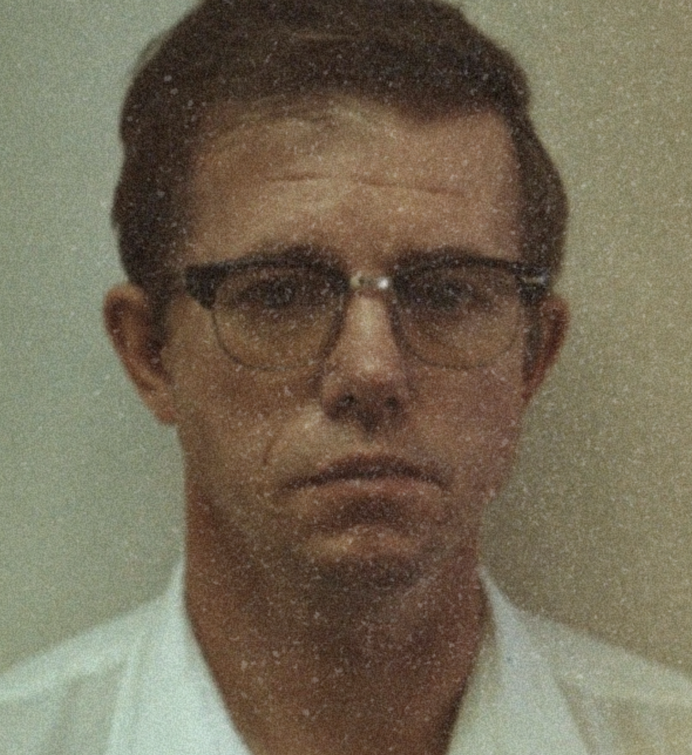
- Hansen's mugshot, c. 1983
- Born: Robert Christian Hansen; February 15, 1939; Estherville, Iowa, U.S.
- Died: August 21, 2014 (aged 75); Anchorage, Alaska, U.S.
- Other names: Bob the Baker; Bob Hansen; The Butcher Baker; The Runaway Killer
- Status: Deceased
- Conviction: First degree murder (4 counts)
- Penalty: 461 years imprisonment without parole

Details
- Victims: 17–37 killed 31+ raped 3+ victimless crimes 1 attempted murder 1 attempted rape
- Span of crimes: December 22, 1971 – June 13, 1983
- Country: United States
- State: Alaska
- Date apprehended: October 27, 1983
- Imprisoned at: Spring Creek Correctional Center, Seward, Alaska (until his death)

Robert Christian Boes Hansen (February 15, 1939 – August 21, 2014), also known as the Butcher Baker, was an American serial killer and serial rapist active in Anchorage, Alaska, between 1971 and 1983, abducting, raping and murdering at least seventeen women. Hansen released many of his victims into the wilderness and hunted them with a Ruger Mini-14 semi-automatic rifle and hunting knives. Hansen was captured in 1983 and sentenced to 461 years' imprisonment without the possibility of parole. He died in 2014 of natural causes at the age of 75.

== Early life ==
Robert Hansen was born in Estherville, Iowa, on February 15, 1939, the elder of two children to an American mother, Edna Margret Hansen (née Petersen; October 27, 1916 – April 24, 2005) and a Danish father, Christian "Chris" Hansen (September 16, 1907 – August 12, 1983). The family moved to Richmond, California, in 1942, but returned to Iowa in 1949 and settled in the city of Pocahontas, where Hansen worked at a bakery owned by his father.

In his youth, Hansen was painfully shy, had a stutter and suffered severe acne that left him permanently scarred. Throughout childhood and adolescence, he was described as a quiet loner who had a difficult relationship with his domineering father. Hansen took to practicing both hunting and archery, often finding refuge in those pastimes. In 1957, Hansen enlisted in the United States Army Reserve and served for one year at Fort Polk in Louisiana before being discharged. He later worked as an assistant drill instructor at a police academy in Pocahontas. There, he began a relationship with a younger woman, whom he married in 1960.

== First crimes ==
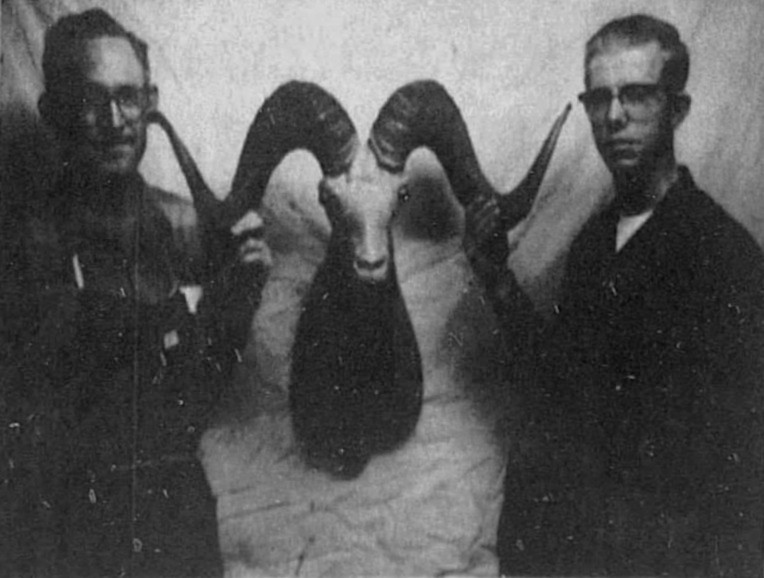
Hansen (right) poses with a taxidermized dall sheep in an August 19, 1971, issue of the Anchorage Times

On December 7, 1960, Hansen was arrested for burning down a Pocahontas County school bus garage, as revenge for his mistreatment in high school. He served twenty months of a three-year prison sentence in Anamosa State Penitentiary, during which his first wife divorced him. During his incarceration, Hansen was diagnosed with manic depression with periodic schizophrenic episodes. The psychiatrist who made the diagnosis noted that Hansen had an "infantile personality" and was obsessed with getting back at people he felt had wronged him.

Over the next few years, Hansen was jailed several times for petty theft. In 1967 he moved to Anchorage, Alaska, with his second wife, whom he had married in 1963 and with whom he had two children. In Anchorage, Hansen opened his own bakery, was well-liked by his neighbors and set several local hunting records.

In December 1971, Hansen was arrested twice, first for abducting and attempting to rape an unidentified housewife, then for raping an unidentified sex worker. He pleaded no contest to assault with a deadly weapon in the former offense; the rape charge involving the sex worker was dropped as part of a plea bargain. Hansen was sentenced to five years in prison. After serving six months of his sentence, he was placed on a work release program and released to a halfway house.

In 1976, Hansen pleaded guilty to larceny after he attempted to steal a chainsaw from an Anchorage Fred Meyer store. He was sentenced to five years in prison and required to receive psychiatric treatment for his manic depression. The Alaska Supreme Court reduced Hansen's sentence, and he was released with time served.

== Murders and capture ==
Hansen's modus operandi is believed to have been to stalk a woman to learn her habits, eventually picking her up in his car and forcing her at gunpoint into his home, where he would rape her, then stab or shoot her. Some of the women Hansen murdered were sex workers; many were teenagers.

It is believed by authorities that Hansen's first murder victim was eighteen-year-old Celia van Zanten. Van Zanten was kidnapped on December 22, 1971, and froze to death in the wilderness after escaping from her abductor; her body was discovered on December 25. The abduction occurred three days after Hansen committed his assault on the sex worker for which he was imprisoned. While there are some similarities between Hansen's modus operandi and Van Zanten's abduction, there is no conclusive evidence linking him to the attack and Hansen himself denied involvement.

On June 13, 1983, Hansen offered seventeen-year-old Cindy Paulson $200 to perform oral sex; when she got into the car, he pulled out a gun and drove her to his home in the Muldoon neighborhood of Anchorage. There, he held her captive and proceeded to rape and torture her. Paulson later told police that after Hansen chained her by the neck to a post in his basement, he took a nap on a nearby couch. When he awoke, he put her in his car and took her to Merrill Field, where he told her that he intended to take her to his cabin near the Knik River area of the Matanuska-Susitna Valley, accessible only by boat or bush plane. Paulson, crouched in the back seat of Hansen's car with her wrists cuffed in front of her body, saw a chance to escape when he was busy loading the cockpit of his airplane, a Piper PA-18 Super Cub. While Hansen's back was turned, Paulson crawled out of the back seat, opened the driver's side door and ran toward nearby Sixth Avenue.

Paulson later told police that she had left her blue sneakers on the passenger side floor of the backseat of Hansen's car as evidence that she had been inside. Hansen panicked and chased her, but Paulson reached Sixth Avenue and managed to flag down a passing truck. The driver, Robert Yount, alarmed by Paulson's disheveled appearance, stopped and offered assistance. He drove her to the Mush Inn, where she jumped out of the truck and ran inside. While Paulson pleaded with the clerk to phone her boyfriend at the Big Timber Motel, Yount continued on to work, where he called police to report the incident.

When Anchorage Police Department (APD) officers arrived at the Mush Inn, they were told that Paulson had taken a cab to the Big Timber Motel. APD officers arrived there and found Paulson in Room 110, still handcuffed and alone. She was taken to APD headquarters, where she described her attacker. Hansen, when questioned by investigators, denied Paulson's accusation, stating that she was trying to cause trouble for him because he refused to pay her extortion demands. This excuse became one Hansen used on other occasions, but although he had several prior run-ins with the law, Hansen's meek demeanor and humble occupation as a baker, along with an alibi from his friend John Henning, persuaded police not to consider him a serious suspect.

Detective Glenn Flothe of the Alaska State Troopers had been part of a team investigating the discovery of several bodies in and around Anchorage, Seward and the Matanuska-Susitna Valley area. The first of the bodies was found by construction workers near Eklutna Road. The body, dubbed "Eklutna Annie" by investigators, has never been identified. Later that year, the body of Joanna Messina was discovered in a gravel pit near Seward, and in 1982 the remains of twenty-three-year-old Sherry Morrow were discovered in a shallow grave near the Knik River. Flothe believed all three women had been murdered by the same perpetrator.

Flothe contacted Federal Bureau of Investigation (FBI) Special Agent John E. Douglas and requested help with an offender profile based on the three recovered bodies. Douglas thought the killer would be an experienced hunter with low self-esteem, have a history of being rejected by women and would feel compelled to keep "souvenirs" of his murders, such as a victim's jewelry. He also suggested that the assailant might stutter. Using this profile, Flothe investigated possible suspects until he reached Hansen, who fit the profile and owned a plane.

Supported by Paulson's testimony and Douglas' profile, Flothe and the APD secured a warrant to search Hansen's plane, vehicles and home. On October 27, 1983, investigators uncovered jewelry belonging to some of the missing women as well as an array of firearms in a corner hideaway of Hansen's attic, which included a .223-caliber Ruger Mini-14 semi-automatic rifle. Also found was an aeronautical chart bearing thirty-seven written "x" marks, hidden behind Hansen's headboard. Many of these marks matched sites where bodies had been found (others were discovered later at the locations marked on Hansen's chart).

When confronted with the evidence found in his home, Hansen denied it as long as he could, but he eventually began to blame his victims and tried to justify his actions. Eventually confessing to each item of evidence as it was presented to him, he admitted to a spree of attacks against women starting in 1971. His earliest victims were girls or young women, usually between ages 16 and 19 and not sex workers, unlike some of the victims who led to his discovery.

== Victims ==
Hansen is known to have raped and assaulted over thirty women and to have murdered at least seventeen, ranging in age from 16 to 41, although based on evidence, law enforcement suspect that Hansen killed at least twenty-one female victims. The following is a list of Hansen's confirmed victims and several other additional women who have been mentioned as possible victims. Of these eighteen women, Hansen was only formally charged with the murders of four: Sherry Morrow, Joanna Messina, Eklutna Annie and Paula Goulding. He was also charged with the abduction and rape of Cindy Paulson.

- The remains of "Eklutna Annie" were discovered buried next to a power line in a wooded area, one mile south of South Eklutna Lake Road in Eklutna on July 21, 1980. Hansen admitted to stabbing this victim in the back after she made an effort to flee from his car. She was either a topless dancer or a prostitute, according to Hansen, who also claimed that she was his first murder victim. Despite his claim that Eklutna Annie might have come from Kodiak, troopers think she might have arrived in Alaska via California. Her body had already been largely consumed by wildlife when it was found.
- Celia Beth van Zanten, age 18, left her house on Knik Avenue, Anchorage, in the late evening of December 22, 1971, and walked a few blocks toward a nearby BI-LO supermarket. She never reached the supermarket. Her disappearance was reported two days later. On December 25, Van Zanten's body was discovered at Chugach State Park. Her chest had been sliced with a knife, and she had been bound and subjected to a sexual assault. She had been dumped, still alive, into a deep ravine before dying from exposure. According to forensic evidence, Van Zanten attempted to climb back up the slope but was unable to do so due to her bindings. Hansen has been accused of killing Van Zanten because of an "x" on his murder map that matched the location of her body, but he denied responsibility for both her death and those of other women who were not involved in sex work.
- Megan Siobhan Emerick, age 17, vanished on July 7, 1973, in Seward. She was last spotted leaving a dorm laundry room while attending the Seward Skill Center, a boarding school. She has not been seen or heard from since. Emerick left behind all of her personal items, including her identification. Before contacting police, her roommate conducted a three-day search for her. Hansen denied killing Emerick to authorities, but did admit he was in Seward on the day she vanished. Due to an "x" on his murder map in the Seward region, he is thought to be responsible. Apparently, Hansen admitted to a former inmate that he transported Emerick to a cabin in the Seward region that was only reachable by boat, where he killed and buried her.
- Mary Kathleen Thill, age 22, disappeared from Seward on July 5, 1975. Thill was driven into town by a friend who dropped her off at a local bakery. Between 1:30 and 2:00 p.m., a different acquaintance saw her by a waterfall near her home on Lowell Point Road. She has not been seen or heard from since. Hansen acknowledged being in Seward on the day Thill vanished but denied killing her. An "x" on his murder map in the vicinity of Resurrection Bay increased suspicions about him in the disappearance. Hansen admitted to killing her and discarding her body in Resurrection Bay, according to a former prisoner.
- Joanna Messina, age 24, went out to dinner with Hansen on May 19, 1980, while she was working in Seward. According to Hansen, before Messina offered him sex in exchange for cash, everything was going smoothly. Hansen refused to pay and refused to release her, so he drove her and her dog to a distant area by the Snow River. He struck her with a .22 caliber revolver before shooting her twice and the dog once. He dumped Messina's body in a gravel pit, the dog and Messina's belongings into woodland and the gun into the Snow River. On July 8, Messina's severely decomposed body was found after it had been eviscerated by wildlife.
- Roxane Easland, age 24, vanished on June 28, 1980. She had been residing at the Budget Motel on Spenard Road, Anchorage, with her boyfriend for the previous two weeks. On that day, she was scheduled to meet an unnamed man downtown on Fourth Avenue. She has not been seen or heard from since. Although Hansen admitted to killing her, her body was never discovered.
- Lisa Futrell, age 41, met Hansen at the nightclub where she worked and was subsequently kidnapped on September 6, 1980. When she failed to return home following her September 7 shift, her two younger housemates reported her missing. Her body was discovered on May 9, 1984, buried next to a gravel pit south of the former Knik Arm Bridge.
- Malai Larsen, age 28, was reported missing on July 10, 1981. On April 24, 1984, her body was discovered in a parking lot close to the Knik Arm Bridge.
- Sherry Morrow, age 23, told friends she was meeting a photographer who had promised her $300 for nude images on November 17, 1981. She was never seen again. A shallow grave was discovered by hunters on the banks of the Knik River on September 12, 1982. Morrow, who was reported missing a year earlier, was identified from the remains. She had received three gunshot wounds to the back, and cartridges discovered close to the body revealed that a .223 Ruger Mini-14 hunting rifle had been used to deliver the shots. An odd feature was that although the body was found fully clothed, there were no bullet holes in the clothing, suggesting that Sherry had been naked when shot, and had been redressed after death before being buried.
- Andrea Mona "Fish" Altiery, age 24, was last seen boarding a taxi to go to the Boniface Mall on December 2, 1981. She intended to meet an unnamed male for a photo shoot and to perform exotic dances. She has not been seen or heard from since. When authorities searched Hansen's house, several of Altiery's possessions, including her fish necklace, were discovered. Hansen claimed that after he met her, he threatened her with a gun and abducted her, blindfolding and handcuffing her. Near the Knik Arm Bridge, they took a car to a service road off Palmer Highway. He unbound her there, abused her sexually and killed her with a .22 Browning automatic pistol after she retaliated. He then stole Altiery's necklace, weighted a duffel bag with gravel, tied it to the dead woman and threw her off the bridge. Her body was never found.
- Sue Luna, age 23, voluntarily agreed to a $300 photo shoot offer with a nightclub patron. On May 26, 1982, she met Hansen in a diner parking lot in Anchorage. The following day, Luna was reported missing. Hansen had abducted and killed her, then buried her near the Knik River. She was discovered on April 24, 1984. According to Hansen, he had her flee into the forest while “hunting” her like an animal while she was stripped naked. Luna had been killed via gunshot.
- Tamera "Tami" Pederson, age 20, was a dancer at a nightclub in Anchorage. The last her family heard from her was during a phone call on August 7, 1982, when she claimed to have had been offered money to pose for photographs. She was kidnapped and murdered by Hansen. Her body was not found until Hansen confessed and pointed out its location on a map. On April 29, 1984, the body was recovered 1.5 miles (2.4 km) from the Old Knik Bridge.
- Angela Lynn Feddern, age 24, was last seen on Fourth Avenue, Anchorage, sometime in February 1983. She was not reported missing until May. The owner of a nightclub reported that Feddern, one of his dancers, had gone missing. Hansen had kidnapped and murdered her. Feddern's body was found on April 26, 1984, on a small lake near the larger Figure Eight Lake.
- DeLynne Renee "Sugar" Frey, age 22, was last seen sometime in March 1983 but was not immediately reported missing; she was abducted and killed by Hansen. She was buried as "Jane Doe" in an Anchorage cemetery after her body was discovered on a Knik River sandbar by a bush pilot practicing landings there on August 20, 1985. It was not until 1989 that she was identified when an Alaska State Trooper recognised her jewelry in a case file photo.
- Teresa Watson, age 22, was last seen in Anchorage on March 25, 1983. She informed her roommate that she was meeting a man who would give her $300 in exchange for an hour or two of company. At Scenic Lake, Hansen abducted her and killed her. Hansen was unable to bury her since the earth in the region was still frozen. He abandoned her where she had died. Her body was discovered on April 26, 1984.
- Paula Goulding, age 30, was lured and abducted by Hansen on April 25, 1983. He drove her to his aircraft and once they reached a remote spot, she fought with him and attempted to flee, at which point Hansen shot her with a .223 rifle. On September 2, 1983, Goulding's body was discovered near the Knik River, buried in a shallow grave. She had been wounded in the back, but because her clothing was undamaged, it is possible that she was shot while still naked and then clothed before being buried.
- Cindy Paulson, age 17, met Hansen in Anchorage on June 13, 1983. After agreeing to pay for sex, Hansen instead pulled a .357 Magnum on her and kidnapped her. She was taken to his home, bound and sexually assaulted before Hansen took her to Merrill Field, where his airplane was. Hansen left Paulson alone in his car while he began loading his plane, threatening to kill her if she ran away. She instead fled toward Sixth Avenue. There, she was picked up by a passing driver, Robert Yount. Yount took Paulson to a safe location and shortly after, called police. At about the same time, a security guard at Merrill Field noticed suspicious activity; although he made no contact, he noted the license tag for Hansen's car. Police located and interviewed Paulson about the attack.
- The partial skeletal remains of Robin Pelkey, age 19, were found on April 25, 1984, in Palmer, Alaska, close to Horseshoe Lake. It was determined that she had been stabbed and shot. It is unknown if this victim was involved in sex work. In October 2021, forensic genealogy was used to determine her identity, having been known by the moniker "Horseshoe Harriet" before she was identified. Pelkey was residing in Anchorage when she vanished on July 19, 1983.

== Imprisonment and death ==
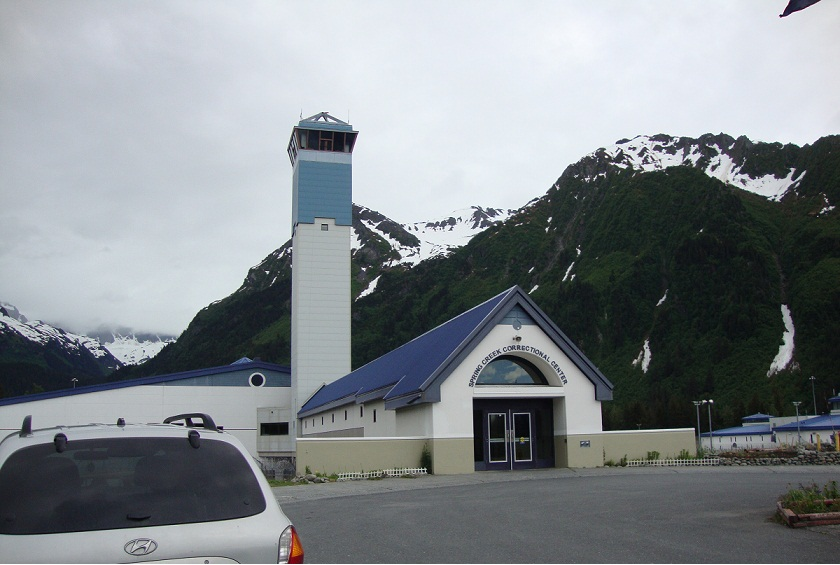
Spring Creek Correctional Center, where Hansen was incarcerated for many years

Once arrested, Hansen was charged with assault, kidnapping, multiple weapons offenses, theft and insurance fraud. The last charge was related to a claim filed with his insurance company over the alleged theft of some hunting trophies; he used the proceeds to purchase his plane. At trial, he claimed he later recovered the trophies in his backyard but forgot to inform the insurer.

Following his capture, Hansen's second wife and their two children left Anchorage permanently and moved to Arkansas. The children's names have never been publicized and they live in anonymity.

Hansen entered into a plea bargain after ballistics tests returned a match between bullets found at the crime scenes and Hansen's rifle. He pleaded guilty to the four homicides police had evidence for (Morrow, Messina, Goulding and Eklutna Annie) and provided details about his other victims in return for serving his sentence in a federal prison, along with no publicity in the press. Another condition of the plea bargain was his participation in deciphering the markings on his aviation map and locating his victims' bodies. Hansen confirmed the police theory of how the women were abducted, adding that he would sometimes let a potential victim go if she convinced him that she would not report him to police. He indicated that he began killing in the early 1970s.

Hansen showed investigators seventeen grave sites in and around Southcentral Alaska, twelve of which were unknown to investigators. There remained marks on his map that he refused to give up, including three in Resurrection Bay, near Seward. Authorities suspect two of these marks are the graves of Thill and Emrick, whom Hansen has denied killing. The remains of twelve of a probable twenty-one to thirty-seven victims were exhumed by the police and returned to their families.

Hansen was sentenced to 461 years in prison without the possibility of parole. He was first imprisoned at the United States Penitentiary, Lewisburg in Lewisburg, Pennsylvania. In 1988, he was returned to Alaska and briefly incarcerated at Lemon Creek Correctional Center in Juneau. He was also imprisoned at Spring Creek Correctional Center in Seward until May 2014, when he was transported to the Anchorage Correctional Complex for health reasons. Hansen died on August 21, 2014, age 75, at Alaska Regional Hospital in Anchorage due to natural causes related to lingering health conditions. His body was later cremated after his death.

== In popular culture ==
=== Films ===
- Naked Fear (2007), about a serial killer who hunts and abducts women in the remote wilderness of New Mexico, is loosely based on Robert Hansen.
- In The Frozen Ground (2013), John Cusack portrayed Hansen opposite Nicolas Cage as Sergeant Jack Halcombe (a character based on Glenn Flothe) and Vanessa Hudgens as victim-survivor Cindy Paulson.

==== Documentaries ====
- The FBI Files episode "Hunter's Game" (1999) depicts Hansen's murderous rampage.
- The Alaska: Ice Cold Killers episode "Hunting Humans" (January 25, 2012) on Investigation Discovery covered the Hansen case.
- Hidden City season 1, episode 12 ("Anchorage: Robert Hansen's Most Dangerous Game, the Legend of Blackjack Sturges, Eskimo Hu"; airdate February 21, 2012) on the Travel Channel covered the Hansen case.
- Mark of a Killer season 2, episode 6 "Hunted to Death" on Oxygen covered the Hansen case.
- The Butcher Baker: Mind of a Monster aired on September 2, 2020, on Investigation Discovery.
- Very Scary People season 3 episodes 3 and 4, "The Butcher Baker: Terror In The Wilderness part 1" and "The Butcher Baker: The Girls Who Got Away part 2", on Crime and Investigation aired June 5, 2022.
- Most Evil Killers series 7, episode 2 on Sky Crime tells Hansen's story.

==== TV series ====
- "Mind Hunters" and "The Woods", two episodes of the CBS TV series Cold Case that aired in November 2004 and May 2005, respectively, were inspired by Hansen's crimes.
- In Criminal Minds, season 5, episode 21 ("Exit Wounds"; airdate May 12, 2010), Hansen is referred to by name.
- Hansen's crimes inspired Law & Order: Special Victims Unit, season 13, episode 15 ("Hunting Ground"; airdate February 22, 2012), which depicts a serial killer who hunts women like wild game before killing them.
- Kurt Caldwell, known as the Runaway Killer, played by Clancy Brown in Dexter: New Blood was loosely based on Hansen.
- Two 2014 episodes of Silent Witness, series 17, 5 and 6, "In a Lonely Place" depict a serial killer who abducts, rapes, and then kills women by hunting them in a remote forest area.

=== Other ===
- The case was covered in two parts on September 25, 2021, and October 2, 2021, by the Casefile True Crime Podcast
- The case was covered in two parts on February 6, 2019, and February 13, 2019, by Morbid: A True Crime Podcast
- In 2023, the electronic industrial band SKYND released a song titled, and about, Robert Hansen
- The lyrics to "Human Trophies" from American brutal death metal band Deeds of Flesh depict a serial killer with similar characteristics to Robert Hansen

== See also ==
- List of serial killers by number of victims
- List of serial killers in the United States
- List of serial rapists
- The Most Dangerous Game—short story about a man being hunted for sport
