= Knik Arm Bridge =

Dormant proposal for a bridge across Cook Inlet's Knik Arm

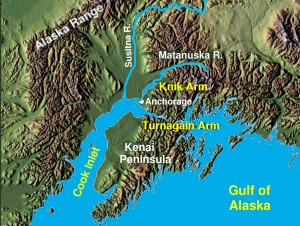
- Coordinates: 61°17′N 149°54′W
- Crosses: Knik Arm
- Locale: Anchorage
- Named for: Knik Arm

Characteristics
- Total length: 1.74 miles (2.80 km)

History
- Construction cost: $800 million (estimated)

Location
- Interactive map of Knik Arm Bridge

The Knik Arm Bridge is a dormant proposal for a 1.74-mile (2.80 km) bridge across Cook Inlet's Knik Arm to link the two fastest growing parts of Alaska – Anchorage and the Matanuska-Susitna Borough.

The project consists of a 1.74-mile (2.80 km) bridge with 18 miles (29 km) of connector roads, including on and off ramps, and a $50 million cut and cover tunnel under Government Hill. Cost estimates are between $700 and $800 million.

Proponents say the crossing would provide access to much-needed residential, commercial and industrial land; create jobs; reduce the cost of transportation to Interior Alaska and the North Slope; lessen carbon emissions and provide an alternative transportation route out of Anchorage. Opponents, however, say that: the crossing would create unnecessary urban sprawl in the Anchorage area; would be more expensive and less used than projected; would divert limited transportation funding away from more critical projects; would disrupt the Government Hill neighborhood and negatively impact the endangered Cook Inlet beluga whales.

== Concept ==
The idea of a bridge or causeway across Knik Arm was first envisioned in 1923 by Alaska Railroad engineers looking for a more efficient route to Alaska's interior. In 1955, a group of Anchorage businessmen studied it again, arriving at a cost estimate of $25 million ($300 million today). The 1968 Seward's Success proposal, an $800 million ($7.4 billion today) multi-phased megaproject encompassing a large domed community, included both an aerial tramway and monorail to span the Knik Arm.

In 2003, the Alaska Legislature created the Knik Arm Bridge And Toll Authority (KABATA) to develop a method of construction, financing, design, operation and maintenance of the bridge. By 2010, KABATA had completed the final Environmental Impact Statement (EIS) and had obtained a "build" Record of Decision from the Federal Highway Administration (FHWA).

== Controversy ==
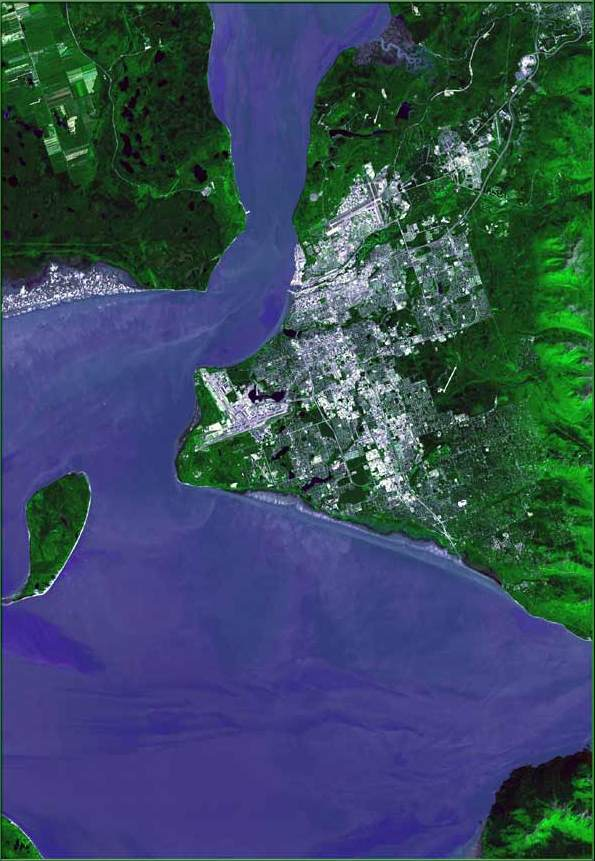
View of area from space. The bridge would cross from the city to Point MacKenzie, Alaska the green area to the NW of the gray city of Anchorage

Many Government Hill residents oppose the plan since many of the options presented would bisect the neighborhood and raze parts of it. Some opponents argue that the bridge is a "pork-barrel project" because it was tied to the Gravina Island Bridge in its $450 million plus funding legislation. There is also concern it could threaten a population of beluga whales despite receiving a biological opinion of 'no jeopardy' from the National Marine Fisheries Service. Interconnecting with existing Anchorage freeways and other arteries presents an additional challenge.

Original funding for the Knik Arm Bridge was provided by an earmark written by Don Young. The same bill funded the so-called "Bridge to Nowhere".

The Knik Arm Bridge and Toll Authority (KABATA) came under scrutiny in September 2006 when reports surfaced that its lead staff had received 20% to 30% raises at an executive session in August, raising to a typical salary of $130,000 per year. KABATA produced a 14-minute video which cost $57,490 including airtime.

Former Governor Sarah Palin has been criticized for supporting the project, with one attorney for an environmentalist group suggesting she only supports it because it serves the area that she comes from. John McCain, Palin's running mate in the 2008 presidential election, opposed the bridge, calling the bill funding it and the Gravina Island Bridge a "monstrosity," that was "terrifying in its fiscal consequences".

In 2011, the city of Anchorage filed a lawsuit to force the federal government to drop its green light for the controversial Knik Arm bridge project, arguing that it would hurt the Port of Anchorage.

Some critics have expressed a belief that the toll revenue estimates provided to rationalize construction are unrealistic.

As the project has been laden with concerns for most of its lifespan, its ultimate demise has long been expected. Funding for the project was repeatedly removed from the state budget by former Governor Bill Walker.

== Support ==
Supporters of the bridge believe that the bridge would allow the growing population of the region to expand into the Point MacKenzie area. The approach road and connectors, along with the bridge total about 10 miles (16 km) from Downtown Anchorage, about the same commuting distance as other available land in Anchorage. The residents of the Matanuska-Susitna Valley currently have only a single road to get to and from Anchorage and points south and Anchorage residents only have a single route to all points north. The Parks Highway which runs through Willow, Alaska, Houston, Alaska and Wasilla, joins the Glenn Highway, which continues along a strip of land between Chugach State Park and the military bases north of Anchorage. The Knik Arm Bridge and connecting roads would provide a secondary north/south roadway to Wasilla. There is concern, however, that the only paved connecting road on the Matanuska/Susitna Borough side of the bridge, which is the Knik Goose Bay Road, is presently overcapacity and listed as one of the four most dangerous roads in the state. The commuting distance for the vast majority of all existing residents of the Matanuska/Susitna Valley would not be lessened by taking the Knik Arm Bridge, a factor that Bridge critics say make KABATA's current revenue forecasts from the proposed bridge tolls to be overstated.

=== Defending Knik Arm Bridge spending ===
In October 2005, Alaska Senator Ted Stevens opposed diverting Alaska's funding for the Gravina and Knik Arm Bridge funds to Louisiana to repair bridge damage in Hurricane Katrina. In his speech on the senate floor, Stevens threatened to quit Congress if the funds were removed from his state. Republicans in Congress dropped the specific allocation for the two bridges, allowing Alaska to apply the funding to current transportation projects. Governor Frank Murkowski planned to fully fund both bridges: "I am proposing we spend the maximum allowed."

== Lawsuit ==
In 2009, Anchorage Metro Area Transportation Solutions (AMATS) decided to postpone the project and remove it from Anchorage's short term transportation plan until 2018. The cities of Houston and Wasilla responded with a lawsuit under the premise that AMATS did not have the authority to delay the project, highlighting that the affected segment of the local road system is designated as a National Highway System route. In March 2010, with new members, the AMATS Policy Committee reversed their previous decision and re-instated the bridge project into the short term transportation plan.

== Received "Record of Decision" from Federal Highways Administration ==
In December 2010, the FHWA issued a "Record of Decision" accepting the project's Environmental Impact Statement, after more than seven years and approximately $53 million were spent on studies, preliminary designs, public relations and cost estimating. KABATA has stated that they have asked their toll and revenue consultant, Wilbur Smith Associates, to re-visit their revenue and toll forecasts to reflect conditions that have changed since 2005. These changed conditions included revised population estimates for the Matanuska-Susitna Borough by the University of Alaska Anchorage's Institute for Social and Economic Research (ISER), of which the estimates were found to be as much as 50% lower than forecasts used in the project's EIS showing that the toll bridge was "financially feasible".

== Legislative action ==
Alaska State Senator Linda Menard and House Representative Mark Neuman introduced a set of companion bills in 2011 to establish a project reserve fund and clarify that the project is an infrastructure project backed by the state. These changes were necessitated by the 2008 financial crisis. It would allow the state to repay the private investors when toll revenue is building up in early years after opening.

Alaska House Bill 159 and Senate Bill 79, introduced in 2011 respectively by Representative Neuman and Senator Menard, set aside $150 million into a "reserve fund" to be paid with State General Funds to cover estimated deficits for the first three years. Additionally, House Bill 158 and Senate Bill 80, also introduced in 2011 by Neuman and Menard, specifies that KABATA bonds would now be "obligations of the state". None of these four bills advanced beyond referral to committee.

KABATA CFO Kevin Hemenway told the Legislature's transportation committees that if the project's reserve fund dropped far enough, "it would be subject to appropriation for replenishment".

In 2013, a legislative audit found that KABATA had overestimated potential revenue from tolls, leading to a decision to place the organization under the direct control of the Alaska Housing Finance Corporation and essentially stripping KABATA of any independent authority. The decision was also expected to significantly slow the project, with AHFC explicitly rejecting any sort of timetable for completion.

The day after KABATA was merged into AHFC, Alaska House Bill 23 (introduced in January 2013) was signed into law, obligating $1.14 billion in state funds for the project.

On December 15, 2014, Governor Bill Walker announced a revised capital budget, cutting $45 million for the project from the capital budget that was created by the previous administration under Governor Sean Parnell.

In 2018, the Alaska Legislature included funding to restart the now-dormant project, but the funding was again vetoed by Governor Walker.

With no funding, the project is effectively dormant for the foreseeable future.

== See also ==
- Knik Arm ferry, a failed alternative plan for crossing Knik Arm
