= Lemon Creek (Alaska) =

Stream in Alaska, U.S.

Coordinates: 58°21′51″N 134°28′45″W

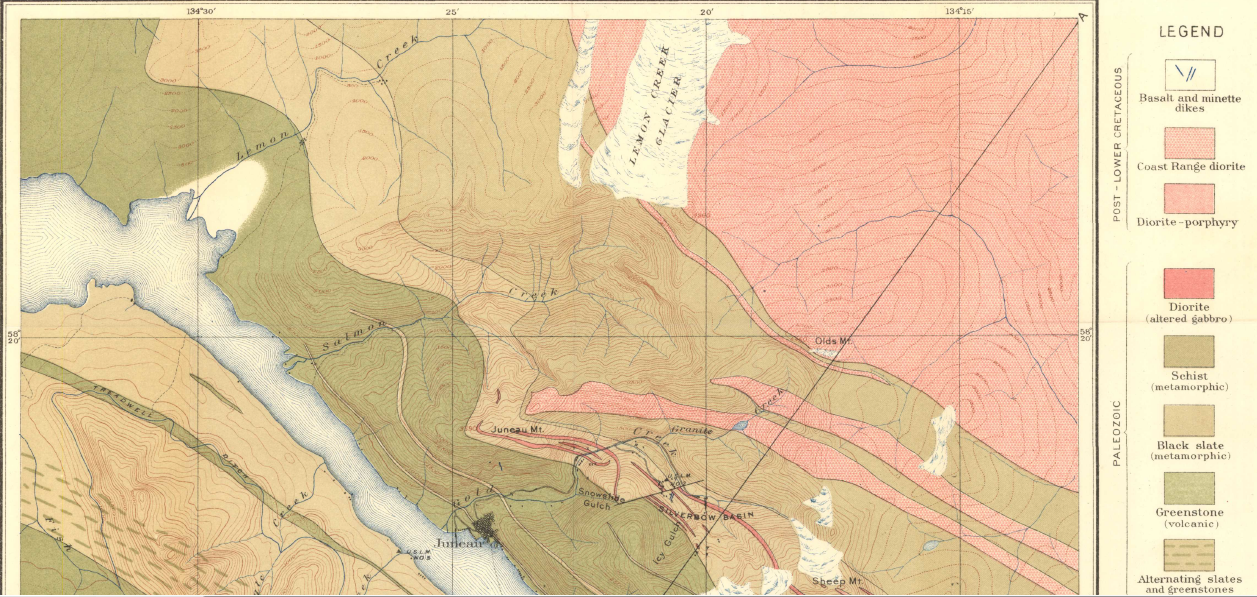
Geological map of the Lemon Creek area

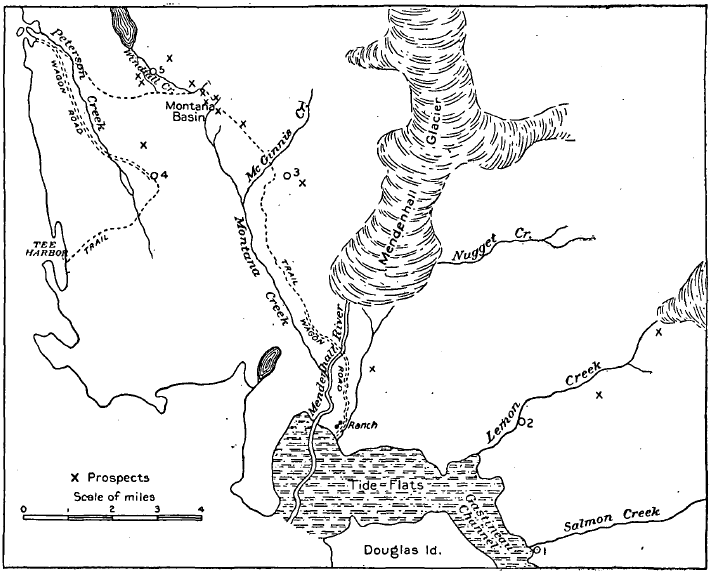
Gold prospects in the Lemon Creek area

Lemon Creek is a stream in the U.S. state of Alaska. It is primarily filled by the meltwater of Lemon Creek Glacier, as well as another glacier. The Lemon name is said to come from traveling miner John Lemon, who reportedly had a placer mine on the creek in 1879.

== Course ==
Its course takes it past Lemon Creek Correctional Center and passes under a bridge built along Juneau's arterial Glacier Highway before emptying on the tidal flat at the head of Gastineau Channel, 5 miles (8.0 km) northwest of the borough of Juneau.

== Description ==
Its drainage area is about 30 square miles (78 km^{2}), and its valley penetrates the Coast Range for a distance of about 8 miles (13 km) . From the south, there are several good-sized tributaries, and the uppermost of these side valleys contains a large glacier, which merges with the ice from the head of the main valley and extends to a point only 6 miles (9.7 km) from the mouth of the creek. The valley is a deep one, the surrounding Blackerby and Heintzleman Ridges rising to 3,500–4,000 feet (1,100–1,200 m), with peaks above 5,000 feet (1,500 m) in the headwater region. The stream bed lies north of the central line of the valley, and on this side the tributaries are closely spaced and their channels only slightly incised in the mountain flank. The grade of the main stream is somewhat irregularly distributed. The mouth of the valley is filled by a delta deposit raised only a few feet above high tide and extending upstream for something over a mile. Above this there is a short rock-cut canyon with a low waterfall or cascade at its head. Next comes a narrow stretch of gravelly bottom land expending upstream for nearly a mile and a half, with a grade of perhaps 200 feet per mile. Then comes a cascade, giving a rise of several hundred feet in a distance of half a mile, and above this the grade is somewhat more gentle, and short gravelly flats occur from place to place, separated by reaches of steeper slope extending to the foot of the glacier.

The surrounding neighborhood shares the Lemon name, and is known to locals as "Lemon Creek"; generally a reference to the neighborhood, and not the creek specifically.

== See also ==
- Alaskan Brewing Company, the area's primary visitor attraction apart from the prison
- Juneau gold belt
