= Ship Creek (Alaska) =

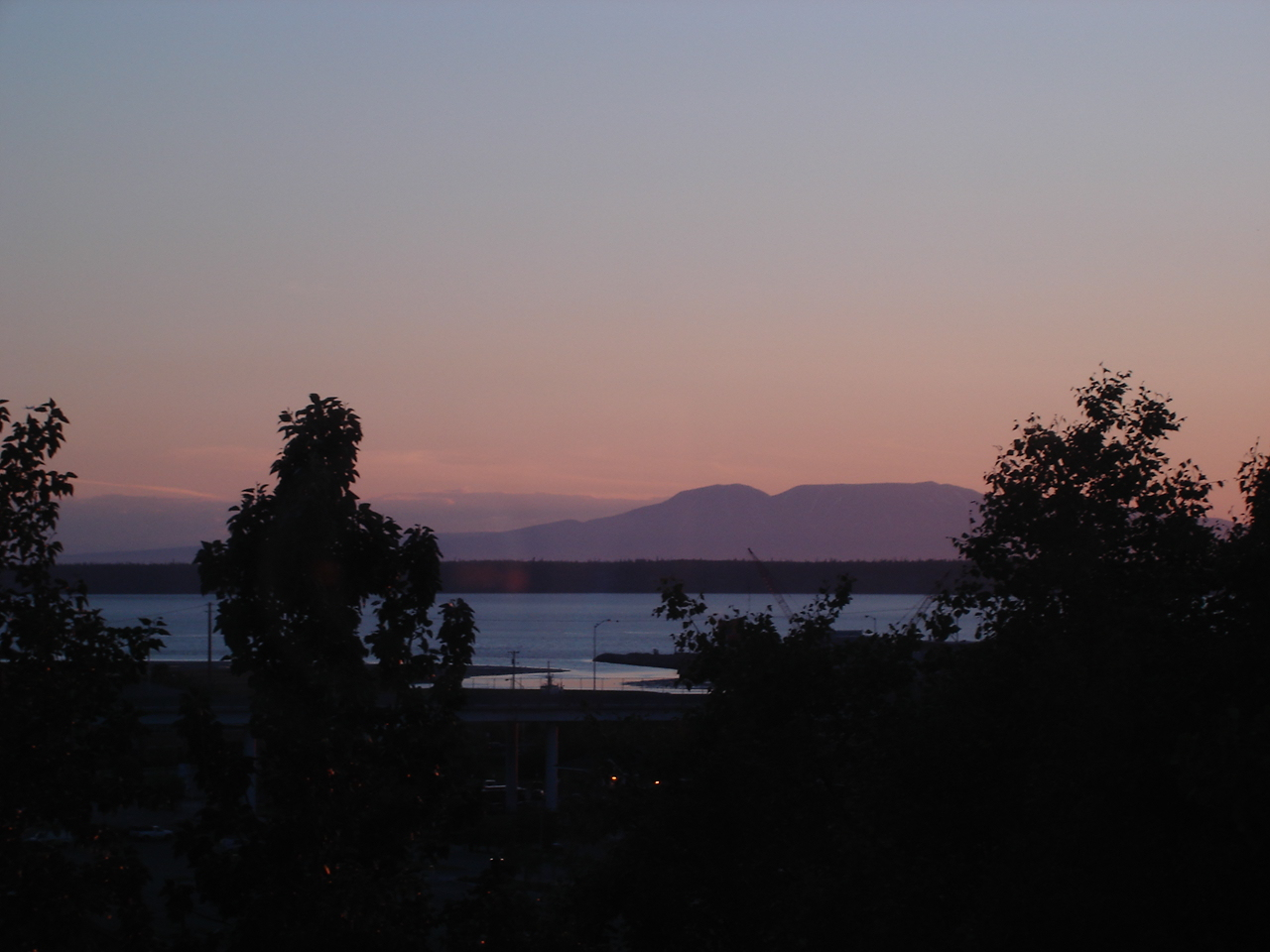
- Sunset view of Cook Inlet and Ship Creek, Mount Susitna in background.

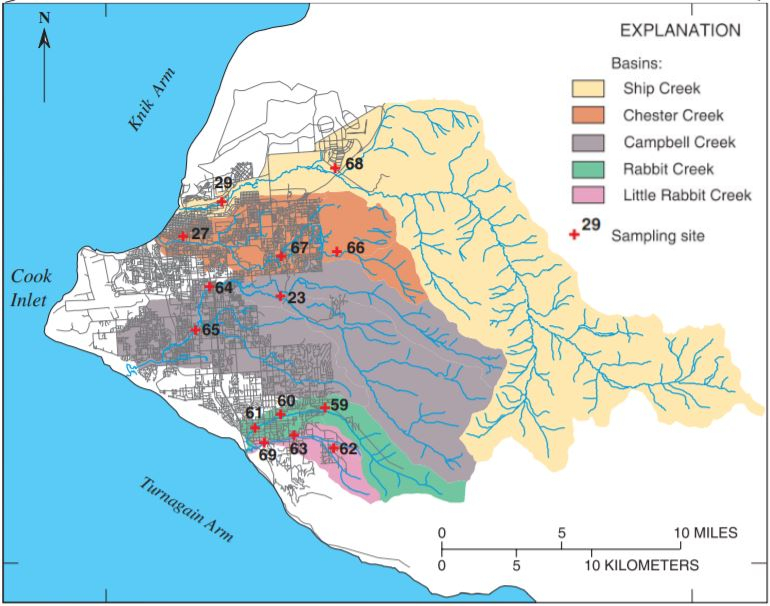
- Watersheds of Anchorage rivers, with Ship Creek in yellow

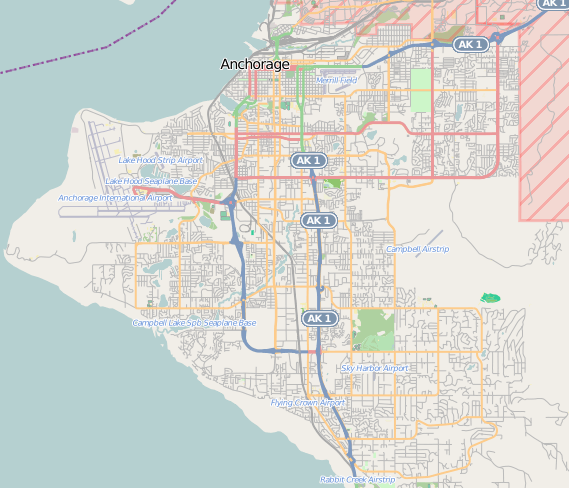
- Location of Mouth of Ship Creek Ship Creek (Alaska) (Alaska)
- Native name: Dgheyaytnu (Denaʼina)

Location
- Country: United States
- State: Alaska
- Municipality: Anchorage

Physical characteristics
- Source: Ship Lake
  - location: Chugach Mountains
  - coordinates: 61.143°N 149.541°W
  - elevation: 2,700 ft (820 m)
- Mouth: Knik Arm, Anchorage
  - coordinates: 61.224°N 149.893°W
- Length: 25 mi (40 km)
- Basin size: 114 square miles (183 square km)
- Discharge
  - location: Knik Arm
  - average: 262 cu ft/s (7.4 m^{3}/s)
  - minimum: 56 cu ft/s (1.6 m^{3}/s)
  - maximum: 870 cu ft/s (25 m^{3}/s)

Basin features
- Tributaries
  - right: North Fork Ship Creek

Ship Creek (Dena'ina: Dgheyaytnu) is an Alaskan river that flows from the Chugach Mountains into Cook Inlet. The Port of Anchorage at the mouth of Ship Creek gave its name ("Knik Anchorage") to the city of Anchorage that grew up nearby.

The river lies entirely within the limits of the Municipality of Anchorage, Alaska. Most of its upper length traverses Joint Base Elmendorf-Richardson.

== History ==
The Dena'ina language name for the creek is Dgheyaytnu. In early 1915, a tent city formed at the mouth of Ship Creek for workers involved in the construction of the Alaska Railroad. This disorganized community was soon relocated south to the bluffs along the creek, forming what would become the early town of Anchorage. In July 1923, President Warren G. Harding arrived at the Ship Creek rail station during his tour of the state to celebrate the completion of the Alaska Railroad and deliver several speeches in Anchorage.

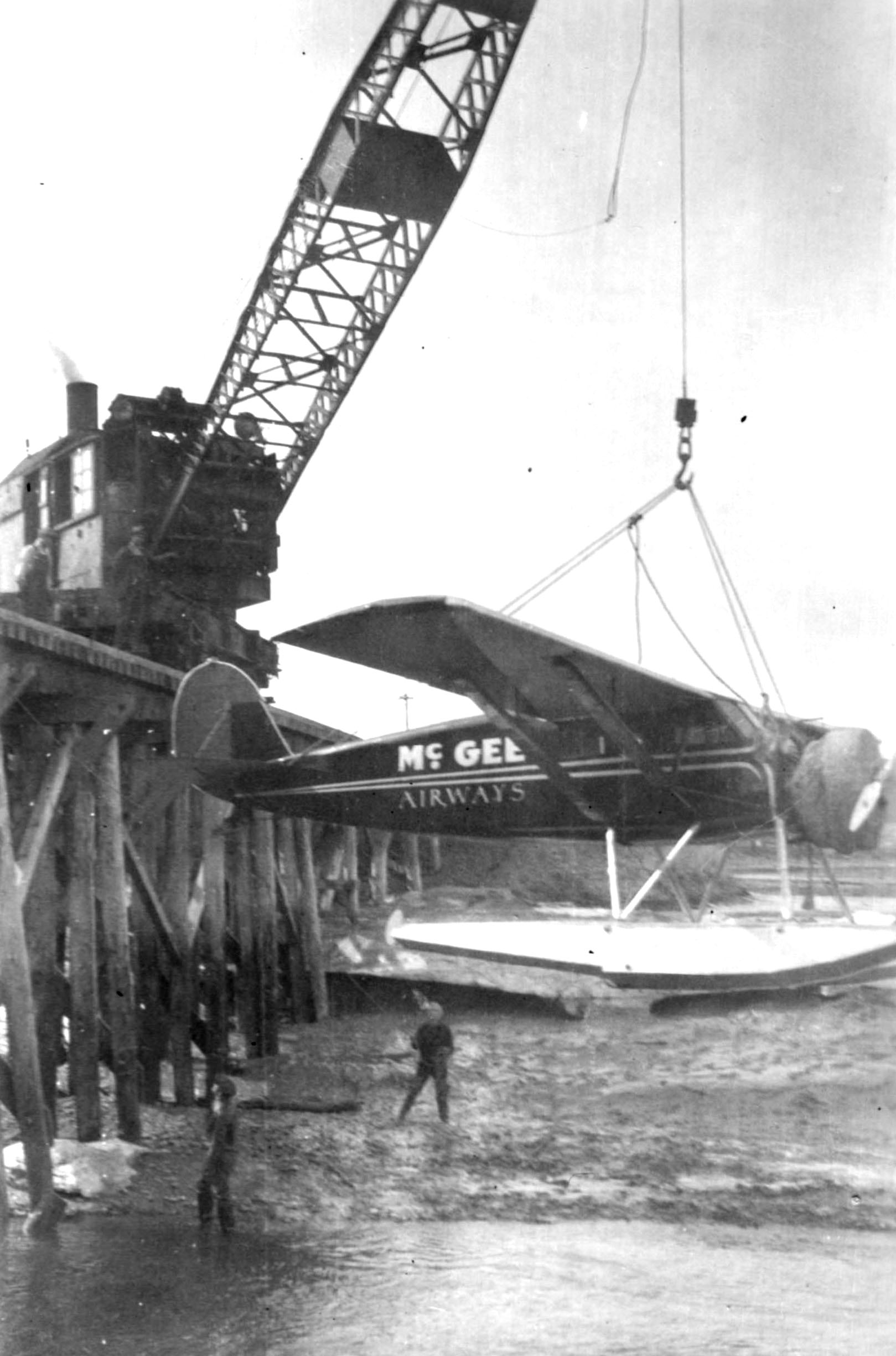
A McGee Airways plane being lowered into Ship Creek.

== Recreation ==
Ship Creek is a popular area for sport fishing and is considered the only urban king salmon fishery in the world. It has an annual run of Coho and Chinook salmon and regularly hosts a salmon derby.

== Watershed and Hydrology ==
Ship Creek's headwaters begin high in the Chugach Mountains at Ship Lake. After a swift descent over mountain bedrock, the creek flows along a sloping glacial outwash plain composed of relatively permeable coarse-grained alluvial deposits as it approaches Knik Arm. It has a drainage area of over 100 square miles (160 square km), much of which lies within the Joint Base Elmendorf Richardson military reservation in the Chugach Mountains.

The streamflow of Ship Creek has been measured by the USGS since 1946. The mean flow between 1946 and 2020 was 262 cubic feet per second (7.4 m^{3}/s), with the lowest daily flow recorded in 1971 at 56 cubic feet per second (1.6 m^{3}/s) and the highest in 1960 at 870 cubic feet per second (25 m^{3}/s).

Water temperatures range from 0 °C (32 °F) throughout the winter (Dec-Mar) to as high as 15 °C (59 °F) in July.

== See also ==
- Chester Creek (Alaska)
- Campbell Creek (Alaska)
- List of Alaska rivers
