= Murder of Eklutna Annie =

Unidentified murder victim discovered in 1980

"Eklutna Annie"
- A 2020 forensic facial reconstruction of Eklutna Annie
- Born: Approx. 1954–1963
- Status: Unidentified for 46 years, 3 months and 1 day
- Died: c. November 1979 – June 1980 (aged 16 – 25)
- Cause of death: Homicide by stabbing
- Body discovered: July 21, 1980; Eklutna, Anchorage, Alaska
- Resting place: Anchorage Memorial Park Cemetery, Anchorage, Alaska; 61.1254°N 149.5234°W (approximate)
- Known for: Unidentified victim of homicide
- Height: Between 4 ft 11 in (1.50 m) and 5 ft 3 in (1.60 m)

Eklutna Annie is the name given to an unidentified murder victim whose body was discovered in a wooded area, one mile south of South Eklutna Lake Road in Eklutna, Anchorage, Alaska, in July 1980. She was aged between 16 and 25 at the time of her death, and her body was discovered several months after her murder. An autopsy report concluded that she had been killed by a single stab wound to the back.

Eklutna Annie was murdered by serial killer Robert Hansen, most likely in 1979. Hansen specifically stated she was his first murder victim.

This unidentified decedent became known as Eklutna Annie due to the location in which her body was discovered. The case remains open, and numerous efforts have been made to determine the identity of the decedent, including several forensic facial reconstructions of how she may have appeared in life.

== Discovery and examination ==
Articles of jewelry worn by Eklutna Annie

On July 17, 1980, Eklutna Annie's skeletal remains were found by workmen, buried in a shallow grave along a series of power lines north of Anchorage. (Note: The remains of topless dancer Joanne Messina were found in the same area later in 1980.) Eklutna Annie's body was markedly decomposed, indicating her death had occurred months prior. She wore several articles of clothing, including a brown leather hip-length jacket, a light-colored knitted sleeveless shirt (possibly white, beige, or light gray in color), blue jeans, and red, knee-high, high-heeled, zip-up boots. A box of Salem matches were found in a pocket of her jacket, indicating she may have been a smoker. The victim was also wearing several pieces of jewelry, including an apparently handmade metal bracelet containing three turquoise stones, a copper necklace containing shell beads, a pendant heart, a Timex metal wristwatch consisting of circular links and with a brown watch face, a ring carved from shell jewelry, and gold-plated, twisted metal hoop earrings.

An autopsy of Eklutna Annie's body revealed she was petite in stature, and most likely white, although she may have had a degree of Native American heritage. She stood between 4 ft 11 in and 5 ft 3 in, and her hair color ranged from light brown to strawberry-blond.

== Abduction ==
Serial killer Robert Hansen admitted responsibility for Eklutna Annie's murder in 1984. According to Hansen, Eklutna Annie had been wearing blue jeans, a sweater, and a brown leather jacket. He was unable to "remember whether she was a prostitute or [a] dancer", although he did state he believed she was from Kodiak, Alaska. He further recollected: "I picked her up downtown and told her I was going to take her to my home". However, when Eklutna Annie realized he was not driving in the direction of his home, she first asked him to drive her back to Anchorage, before he unsuccessfully attempted to convince her he was driving her to another safe location, claiming he was driving a "little further", to which Eklutna Annie replied, "Well, I'm not!" He then attempted to placate her, before pulling a gun, saying: "You do exactly as I say and you won't get hurt."

According to Hansen, he then drove in the direction of Eklutna Lake, with his vehicle eventually becoming stuck on a desolate road as he veered in the direction of a "muddy swamp". According to Hansen, he persuaded Eklutna Annie to help him winch his pickup free from the mud, although when he began to drive his vehicle free, Eklutna Annie attempted to run. In response, he chased after her, grabbed her by the hair and tripped her to the ground.

=== Murder ===
As Eklutna Annie struggled against his efforts to overpower her, she had screamed, "Don't kill me! Don't kill me!" According to Hansen, he had first attempted to placate Eklutna Annie as he restrained her, falsely claiming he did not intend to harm her, although she responded: "You are! You're going to kill me!" He had then stabbed her once in the back with a black-handled Buck knife as she lay face-down.

== Investigation ==
In 1984, Robert Hansen admitted that he was responsible for the victim's death. He said Eklutna Annie was either an exotic dancer from a local bar or a prostitute and that she was his first murder victim, adding that she had been murdered in the fall or early winter of 1979.

Hansen was sentenced to 461 years in prison without the possibility of parole for her murder and three others. He died in prison in August 2014.

== Exclusions ==
To date, Roxane Easland, Karen Evan, Megan Emerick, and Teresa Davis have been ruled out as being Eklutna Annie.

== Aftermath ==
"Identifying [Eklutna Annie] means that no matter how you lived, whatever circumstances that you are in, that even after death, there is an equality here. She deserves just as much as a search for her people as any other victim, as any other survivor."

— Autumn Smith. Advocate for missing and murdered women, reflecting on the ongoing efforts to identify Eklutna Annie

Eklutna Annie remains unidentified. She is the only victim of Robert Hansen to remain unidentified. (Note: A further victim of Hansen, Robin Pelkey, remained unidentified until her identification in October 2021. Hansen led investigators to her body in 1984.)

The remains of Eklutna Annie are interred at the Anchorage Memorial Park Cemetery, under a marker reading "Jane Doe / Died 1980".

Eklutna Annie is still unidentified, despite her face being reconstructed in both 3-D and 2-D. Several missing women are believed to have also been murdered by Hansen.

In September 2020, a revised facial reconstruction of the victim was released by the National Center for Missing & Exploited Children. The organization had previously released a digital reconstruction, and a clay bust of Eklutna Annie had also been created in the past.

== Media ==
=== Film ===
- A feature film, The Frozen Ground, was released in 2013. This film cast Nicolas Cage in the role of state trooper Jack Halcombe and John Cusack as Robert Hansen.

=== Television ===
- The Investigation Discovery channel has broadcast a documentary focusing upon the murders committed by Robert Hansen. This documentary, titled Alaska: Ice Cold Killers, was initially broadcast on January 25, 2012.
- New Dominion Pictures has broadcast a 50-minute documentary focusing on Hansen's murders. Directed by Stuart Taylor, this documentary, titled A Hunter's Game, was first broadcast on November 23, 1999.
- The show Very Scary People profiled Robert Hansen in "The Butcher Baker". It was first broadcast on May 9, 2021.

=== Books ===
- Du Clos, Bernard (1993). Fair Game. New York: Mondo Publishing. ISBN 978-1-852-86484-2.
- Gilmour, Walter; Hale, Leland E. (2016). Butcher, Baker: The True Account of an Alaskan Serial Killer. New York: Open Road Media. ISBN 978-1-504-04948-1.

== See also ==
- Cold case
- Crime in Alaska
- List of murdered American children
- List of unsolved murders (1980–1999)
- National Center for Missing and Exploited Children
- The Doe Network
- Unidentified decedent

== Cited works and further reading ==
- Du Clos, Bernard (1993). Fair Game. New York: Mondo Publishing. ISBN 978-1-852-86484-2.
- Finkelhor, David; Sedlak, Andrea; Hotaling, Gerald T. (1990). Missing, Abducted, Runaway, and Thrownaway Children in America. New York: Officers of Juvenile Justice and Delinquency Prevention. ISBN 0-788-12651-2.
- Gilmour, Walter; Hale, Leland E. (2016). Butcher, Baker: The True Account of an Alaskan Serial Killer. New York: Open Road Media. ISBN 978-1-504-04948-1.
- Halber, Deborah (2015). The Skeleton Crew: How Amateur Sleuths Are Solving America's Coldest Cases. New York: Simon & Schuster. ISBN 978-1-451-65758-6.
- Newton, Michael (2004). The Encyclopedia of Unsolved Crimes. New York: Facts on File. ISBN 978-0-816-07818-9.
- Pettem, Silvia (2013). Cold Case Research: Resources for Unidentified, Missing, and Cold Homicide Cases. Boca Raton: CRC Press. ISBN 978-1-466-57053-5.
- Pettem, Silvia (2017). The Long Term Missing: Hope and Help for Families. Maryland: Rowman & Littlefield. ISBN 978-1-442-25680-4.
- Ressler, Robert (1993). Whoever Fights Monsters. Sydney: Simon & Schuster. ISBN 0-671-71561-5.
- 2020 https://www.alaskasnewssource.com/2020/09/22/do-you-know-this-woman/
- 2014 Anchorage Daily News article pertaining to efforts to identify Eklutna Annie and Horseshoe Harriet
- Official entry of Eklutna Annie at the National Center for Missing and Exploited Children's official website
- Were Robert Hansen's Victims 'Eklutna Annie' or 'Horseshoe Harriet' Ever Identified?: A 2020 news article detailing ongoing efforts to identify Robert Hansen's victims
- Eklutna Annie at The Doe Network
