= Seward's Success, Alaska =

- Unbuilt Community
- Location within Alaska
- Coordinates: 61°15′1.23″N 149°59′29.21″W
- Country: United States
- State: Alaska
- Borough: Matanuska-Susitna
- Named for: William Seward

Seward's Success was a planned community proposed for Point MacKenzie, north of Anchorage, Alaska, United States. The megaproject was to be fully enclosed by a dome spanning the Knik Arm and holding a community of 40,000 residents, with ample residential, office, recreational and commercial space. It was proposed in 1968 after the discovery of oil at Prudhoe Bay and scuttled in 1972 by a delay to the development of the Trans-Alaska Pipeline System.

Its name alludes to "Seward's Folly", an epithet flung at Secretary of State William H. Seward for the 1867 Alaskan Purchase.

== History ==
The plan for constructing Seward's Success developed after the January 1968 discovery of oil reserves at Prudhoe Bay. The $800 million ($7.4 billion today), four-phase community was to have been developed by Tandy Industries of Tulsa, Oklahoma and designed by Adrian Wilson Associates of Los Angeles. The $170 million ($1.6 billion today) initial phase was envisioned to provide for a population of 5,000 and contain 600,000 square feet (56,000 m^{2}) of office space, 300,000 square feet (28,000 m^{2}) of retail space and an indoor sports arena. The central feature of the office construction was the proposed 20-story Alaskan Petroleum Center, which was to serve a variety of oil and oil service companies. The development was touted as the world's first totally enclosed, climate-controlled community.

Transportation between Seward's Success and downtown Anchorage would be accomplished initially by way of a high-speed aerial tramway. Subsequently, a monorail would be built as an additional connection between the town and Anchorage International Airport. Automobiles would not have been allowed inside the community, and all transportation within Seward's Success was to have been provided by way of the aerial tramway, monorail, bicycle paths and moving sidewalks.

The temperature would have been controlled at 68 °F (20 °C) year round. The shell would have been composed of glass designed to work like a greenhouse in maintaining the temperature. Energy to power the community would be generated through natural gas available on-site.

Physical construction of the community would commence in 1970 with the completion of a dock and several roads. However, with construction of the Trans-Alaska Pipeline System delayed due to lawsuits, a group subcontracted by Tandy failed to make the annual lease payment for the 3,209 acres (12.99 km^{2}; 5.01 sq mi) where Seward's Success was to have been located. By 1972, the project was officially cancelled.

== See also ==
- Knik Arm Bridge - Controversial proposed bridge to cross the Knik Arm between Anchorage and the proposed location of Seward's Success.
- Arcology
