= List of Alaska state prisons =

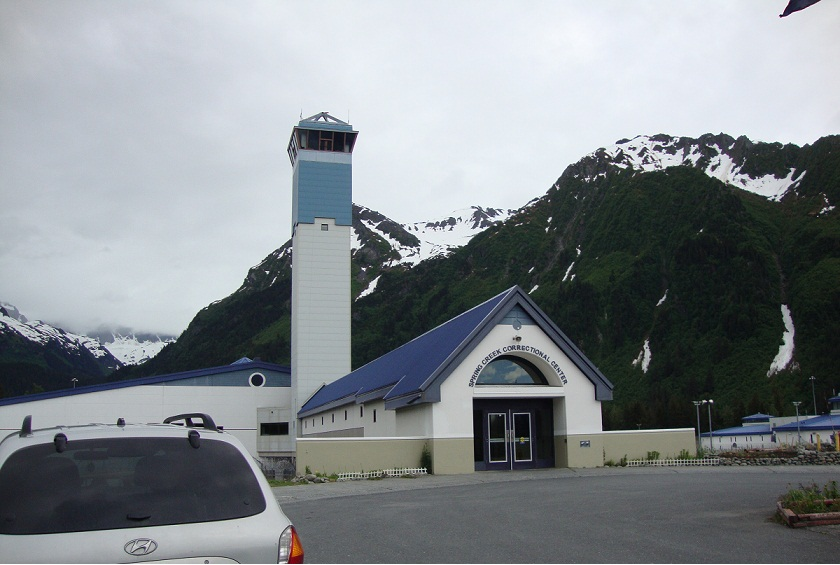
Spring Creek Correctional Center in Seward, Alaska.

The state prison system in Alaska, comprising both pre-trial booking and long-term incarceration for sentenced prisoners, is a unified system run by the Alaska Department of Corrections. Prior to the establishment of the department during the early 1980s, corrections was a division of the Alaska Department of Health and Social Services. That department still operates juvenile correctional facilities through its Division of Juvenile Justice.

There are no federal prisons located in the state of Alaska. Federal prisoners awaiting trial or sentencing are typically held in state facilities. Prisoners who have been sentenced are usually sent to FCI Sheridan, located in Sheridan, Oregon, to serve their sentences.

== Facilities ==
State prisons in Alaska are as follows:

- Anchorage Correctional Complex, Anchorage (working capacity 850), including:
  - Anchorage Correctional Complex East, formerly known as Anchorage Jail
  - Anchorage Correctional Complex West, formerly known as Cook Inlet Pre-Trial
- Anvil Mountain Correctional Center, Nome (capacity 115)
- Fairbanks Correctional Center, Fairbanks (capacity 257) Medium Security.
- Goose Creek Correctional Center, Point MacKenzie, Wasilla, Alaska (capacity 1,536) Medium Security
- Hiland Mountain Correctional Center, Anchorage (Eagle River) (capacity 415), the state's dedicated facility for female prisoners
- Ketchikan Correctional Center, Ketchikan (capacity 71)
- Lemon Creek Correctional Center, Juneau (capacity 248), both intake facility and prison
- Mat-Su Pretrial Facility, Palmer (capacity 112)
- Palmer Medium and Minimum Correctional Centers, Palmer (capacity 492)
- Spring Creek Correctional Center, Seward(capacity 535) Maximum Security.
- Wildwood Correctional Center, near Kenai(capacity 255) Medium Security.
- Wildwood Pretrial Facility, near Kenai(capacity 113) All custody.
- Yukon-Kuskokwim Correctional Center, Bethel (capacity 207)
- Point MacKenzie Correctional Farm, Point MacKenzie

== See also ==
- List of law enforcement agencies in Alaska
- List of United States state correction agencies
- List of U.S. state prisons
- Prison
