= Florence Correctional Center =

Privately owned prison in Arizona

Coordinates: 33°02′13″N 111°22′17″W

- Interactive map of Florence Correctional Center
- Location: 1100 Bowling Road Florence, Arizona
- Status: open
- Security class: medium
- Capacity: 1824
- Opened: 1999
- Managed by: Corrections Corporation of America

Florence Correctional Center (FCC) is a medium-security prison for men in Florence, Arizona, owned by CoreCivic (formally, Corrections Corporation of America). The current contracts that the company holds at this location are United States Immigration and Customs Enforcement (ICE), United States Marshal Service (USMS), and City of Mesa. Opened in 1999, the current capacity of the facility is 1824. Roughly 550 beds are for ICE detainees Nearly 1234 beds are for the Marshal Service and about 80 for the City of Mesa.

In 2005, CCA contracted with the Alaska Department of Corrections to keep more than 30% of the state's inmates in FCC. Many of these Alaskans were detainees awaiting trial. In 2017, Mesa agreed to a three-year contract with CoreCivic to house inmates in FCC, becoming the first city in Arizona to use a private prison.

The prison is one of several state, federal and private prisons in Florence.
