= Spring Creek Correctional Center =

Maximum security men's prison in Alaska, United States

Coordinates: 60.093953°N 149.335785°W

Spring Creek Correctional Center (SCCC)
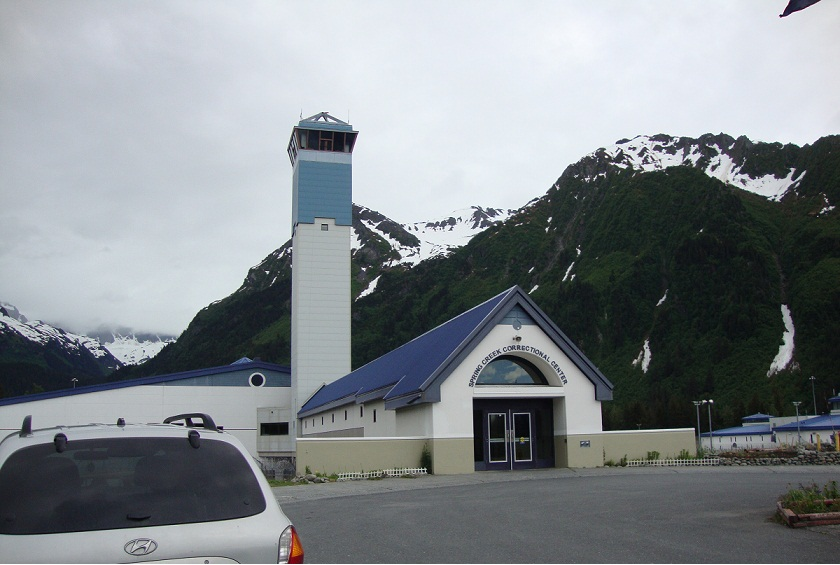
- Interactive map of Spring Creek Correctional Center (SCCC)
- Location: Seward, Alaska
- Status: Operational
- Security class: Maximum
- Capacity: 500+
- Opened: 1988
- Managed by: Alaska Department of Corrections
- Director: Lynnie Einerson (Acting Superintendent)

Spring Creek Correctional Center is an Alaska Department of Corrections maximum security prison for men located in Seward, Alaska, United States. The prison is located approximately 125 miles (201 km) south of Anchorage. The prison is located on about 328 acres (1.33 km^{2}) of land surrounded by national parks. The prison capacity consists of over 500 inmates and 97 correctional officers. Built as a decentralized campus, the prison construction was completed in 1988 at a cost of $44,678,000. A large portion of the prisoner population consists of "hard core" felons who committed violent crimes, such as murder. The Alaska DOC says that these prisoners "will probably spend the rest of their life in prison." Spring Creek also houses prisoners who committed less serious crimes like assault and burglary and usually have sentences from three years to ten years.

== Operational history ==
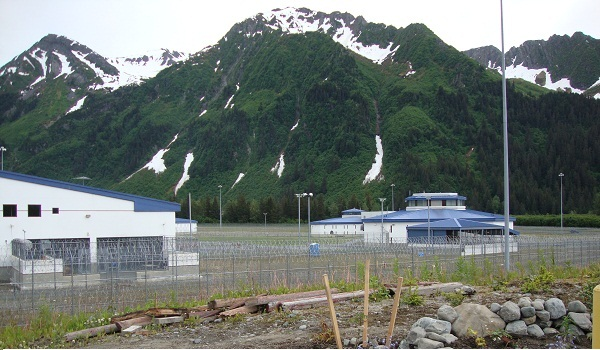
Spring Creek's buildings and yard are seen beyond the fenced perimeter

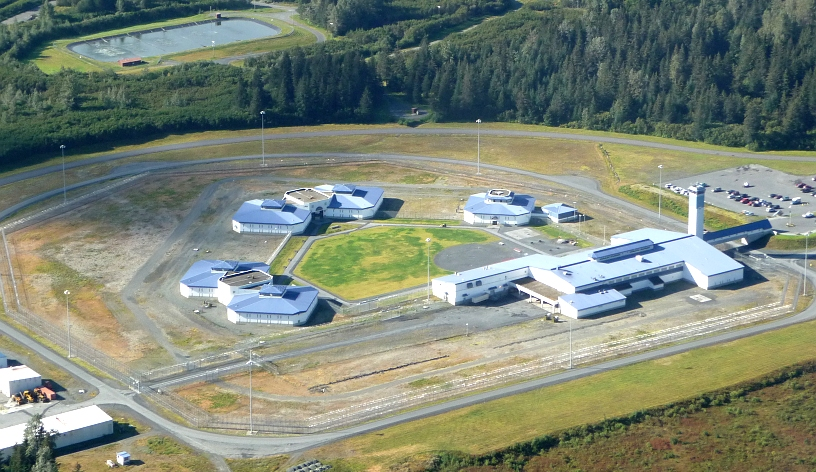
Spring Creek Correctional Center as seen from the air

In the prison's history, there have been two murders inside the prison, one escape and at least one failed escape plot.

=== Murders ===
In 2004, Spring Creek inmate Carl Abuhl, already incarcerated for another murder, killed his cellmate Gregory Beaudoin. Abuhl was convicted of Beaudoin's murder and sentenced to an additional 30 years in prison.

In 2008, convicted murderer John Carlin III was beaten to death in Spring Creek. Carlin was the alleged co-conspirator in the case of Mechele Linehan, a former stripper convicted in the death of her ex-fiancé Kent Leppink.

=== Escapes and escape attempts ===
An escape involving two inmates from Spring Creek occurred in 1994; both were subsequently recaptured. A second, unrelated escape plot in 2001 was unsuccessful.

=== 2015 incident ===
In July 2015 a distraught woman from North Pole approached the prison gates with a gun and demanded that "murderers" be freed. She proceeded to shoot herself in the head when the prison did not immediately comply. Although prison staff responded and applied CPR, the woman died from the head wound within a few hours. Her exact motivations or possible relationship to inmates at Spring Creek are unknown.

== Notable inmates ==
- Robert Hansen, a serial killer convicted of killing numerous women in or near Anchorage, Alaska.
- Evan Ramsey, perpetrator of the Bethel Regional High School shooting in Bethel, Alaska that occurred on February 19, 1997. His story was profiled on A&E's Kids Who Kill.

== MSNBC documentary ==
Spring Creek was profiled in an MSNBC documentary entitled Lockup: Spring Creek, Alaska. Numerous Spring Creek inmates were profiled, including Carl Abuhl, John Bright and Cordell Boyd.

== See also ==
- List of Alaska state prisons
- Alaska Department of Corrections
- Seward, Alaska
