= Goose Creek Correctional Center =

Alaskan state prison

Coordinates: 61°21′31″N 150°00′21″W

- Interactive map of Goose Creek Correctional Center
- Location: Port Access Road and Alsop Road Point MacKenzie, Alaska
- Security class: medium security
- Capacity: 1536
- Opened: July 2012
- Managed by: Alaska Department of Corrections

Goose Creek Correctional Center is an Alaska Department of Corrections state medium-security prison for men, located at the corner of Port Access Road and Alsop Road in Point MacKenzie, Alaska, in the Matanuska-Susitna Valley.

The 435,000-square foot, $240 million facility has been controversial for its cost. Construction started in July 2009. It accepted its first prisoners in July 2012, with the state planning for all 1,050 state prisoners formerly housed out of state (in private prisons in Colorado and Arizona) to be housed in Goose Creek by September 2013.
