= Wildwood Correctional Complex =

Prison complex near Kenai, Alaska

Coordinates: 60.5832°N 151.301°W

- Interactive map of Wildwood Correctional Complex
- Location: 10 Chugach Avenue Kenai, Alaska
- Status: open
- Security class: mixed
- Capacity: 360
- Opened: 1983
- Managed by: Alaska Department of Corrections

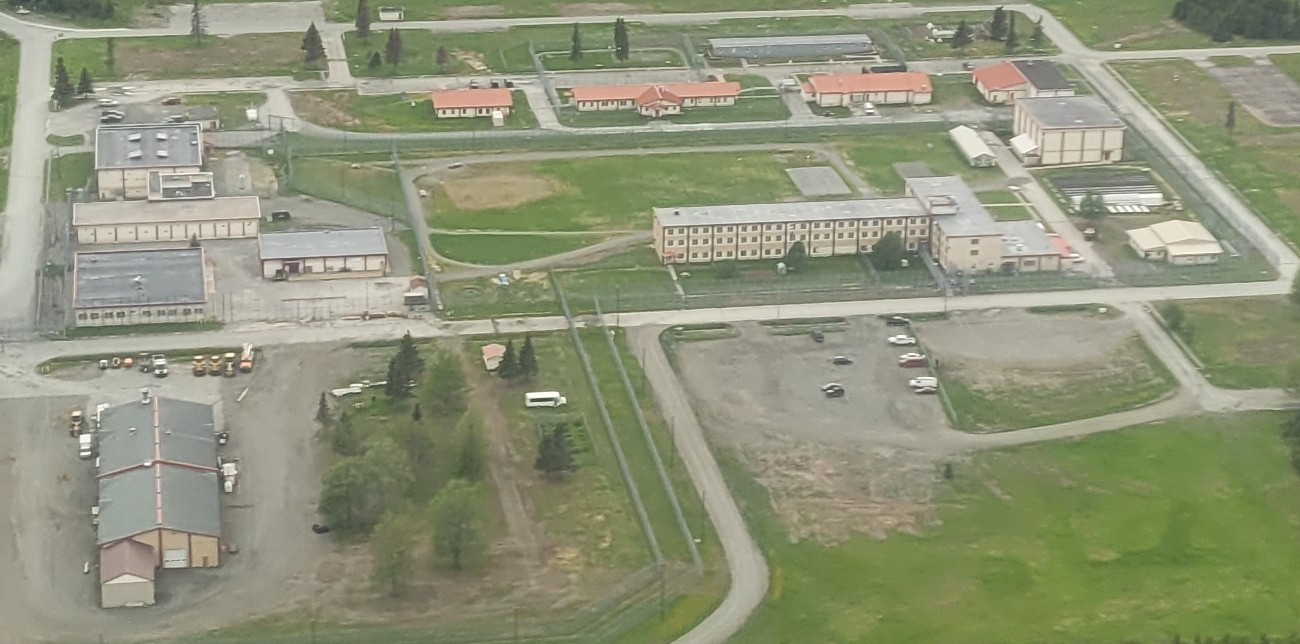
Wildwood Correctional Facility in Kenai, Alaska, aerial photo

The Wildwood Correctional Complex, located three miles north of Kenai, Alaska, is a complex of correctional facilities housing a total of about 360 prisoners and under the jurisdiction of the Alaska Department of Corrections. It consists of Wildwood Correctional Center (Building 10), a 255-bed medium custody long term facility housing sentenced adult male felon and misdemeanor prisoners and also including a correctional industries program, and Wildwood Pre-Trial Facility (Building 5), a 113-bed facility housing male and female adult felon and misdemeanor prisoners of all custody levels.

Wildwood was originally known as Wildwood Army Station, constructed by the U.S. Army as a military communications base in 1951 (completed 1953). In 1965, it was transferred to the U.S. Air Force and became known as Wildwood Air Force Station. In 1974, after briefly being considered as the site for a Bureau of Indian Affairs boarding school, it was turned over to the Kenai Native Association as part of the Alaska Native land claims settlement. In 1983, the State of Alaska leased a portion of the facility for use as a correctional and pre-trial facility, with an option to buy at the end of three years, a purchase which took place in December 1992.
