= Lemon Creek (St. Joseph River tributary) =

Stream in Michigan, US

Coordinates: 41°58′09″N 86°21′37″W

Lemon Creek is a stream in Berrien County, in the U.S. state of Michigan. It is a tributary to the St. Joseph River.

Lemon Creek has the name of William Lemon, a pioneer citizen.
