= Alaska Department of Corrections =

Law enforcement agency in Alaska, USA

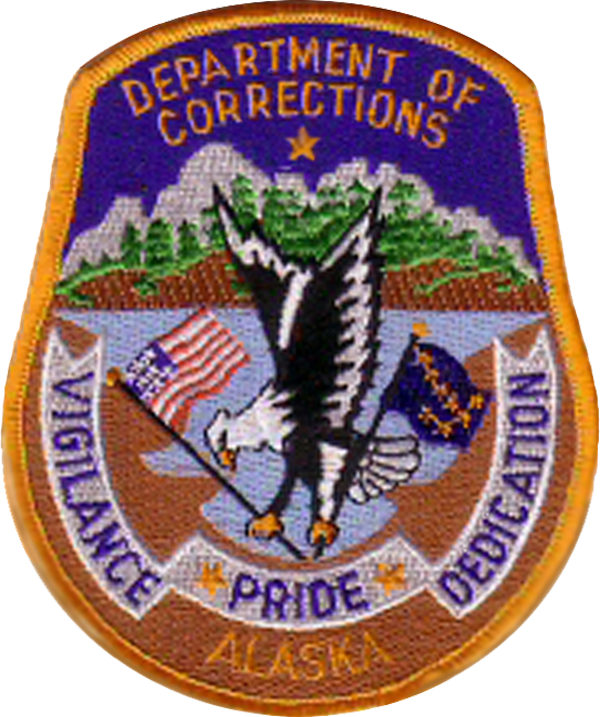
- Abbreviation: ADOC

Agency overview
- Formed: 3 January 1959
- Annual budget: 313,152,000 USD

Jurisdictional structure
- Operations jurisdiction: Alaska, US
- Map of Alaska Department of Corrections's jurisdiction
- General nature: Local civilian police

Operational structure
- Headquarters: Anchorage, Alaska
- Agency executive: Jen Winkelman, Commissioner

Website
- doc.alaska.gov

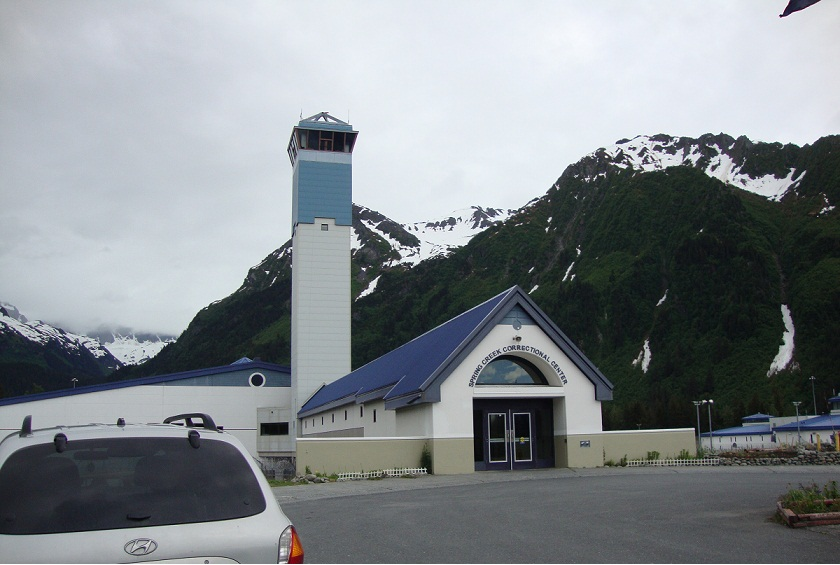
Spring Creek Correctional Center in Seward.

The Department of Corrections of the state of Alaska in the United States is an agency of the state government responsible for corrections. The department manages institutions, parole and probation. The current commissioner is Jen Winkelman. The agency has its headquarters in the Douglas area of Juneau and offices in Anchorage.

== History ==
The State of Alaska assumed jurisdiction over its corrections on January 3, 1959. Prior to statehood, the Federal Bureau of Prisons had correctional jurisdiction over Alaska.

As of 2005 Alaska kept more than 30% of its prisoners in private facilities out of state, most of them at the Florence Correctional Center in Florence, Arizona, owned and operated by Corrections Corporation of America. These statistics left Alaska ranking #2 among states in percentage of its inmates in private prisons, and unlike New Mexico, the leader, many of the Alaskans were detainees awaiting trial.

By 2009 Alaska had moved these prisoners from Florence to CCA's Red Rock Correctional Center in Eloy, Arizona, and were moving them again, to the Hudson Correctional Facility in Hudson, Colorado, then under contract with prison operator Cornell Companies. The opening of the new $240 million Goose Creek Correctional Center in July 2012 allowed the state to bring those prisoners back to Alaska.

== Fallen officers ==
Since the establishment of the Alaska Department of Corrections, 1 officer has died in the line of duty.

== See also ==
- List of law enforcement agencies in Alaska
- List of United States state correction agencies
