= Port of Alaska =

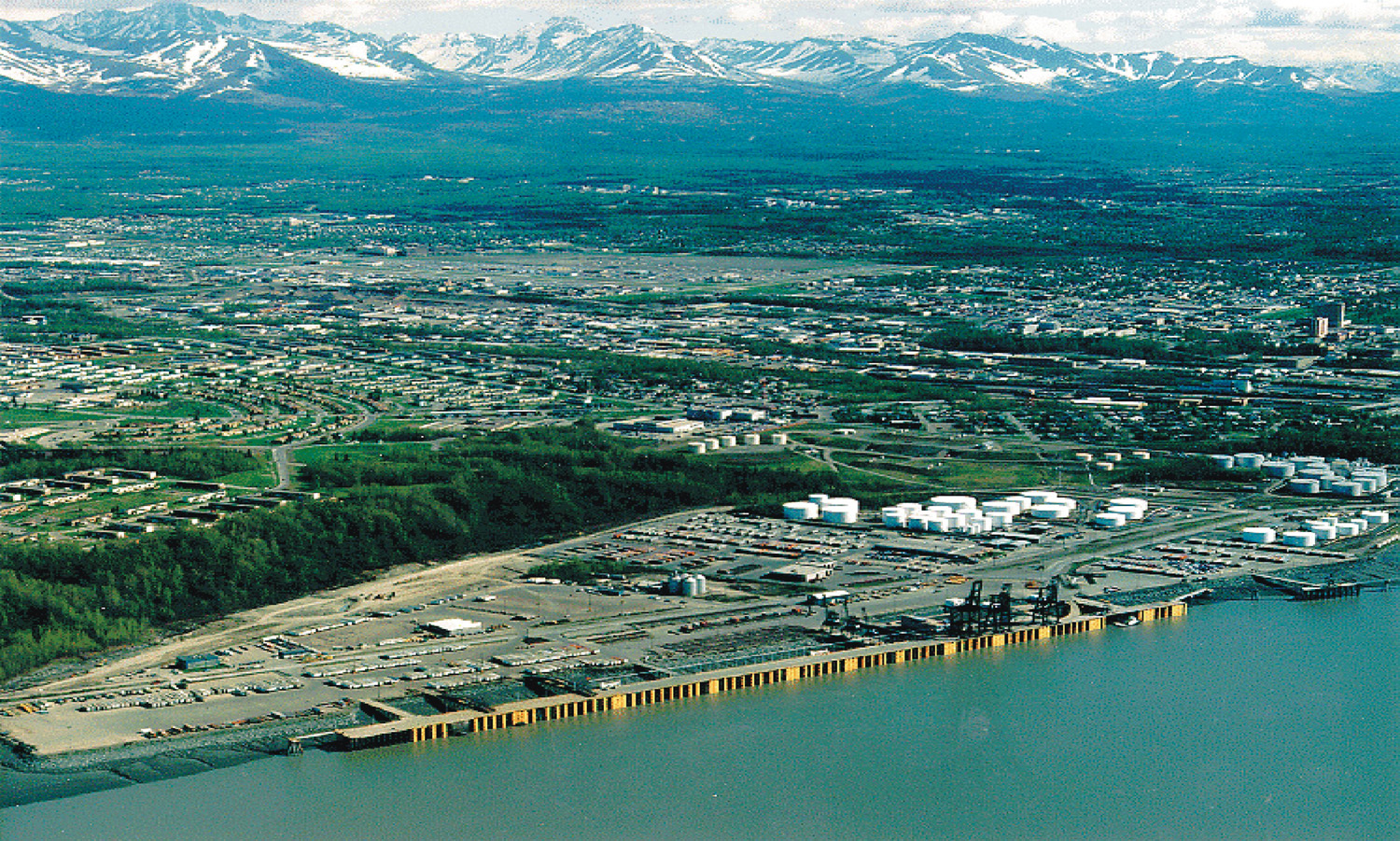
- Oblique aerial view of the Port of Alaska in 1999
- Interactive map of Port of Alaska
- Location of the port in Alaska

Location
- Country: United States
- Location: Knik Arm, Cook Inlet, Pacific Ocean
- Coordinates: 61°14′25″N 149°53′10″W
- UN/LOCODE: USANC

Details
- Opened: 1961
- Operated by: Anchorage Port Commission
- Owned by: Municipality of Anchorage
- Port Director: Stephen Ribuffo
- Deputy Port Director: Sharen Walsh, P.E.
- Director, Finance & Administration: Cheryl Beckham

Statistics
- Annual cargo tonnage: ▲4,704,374 (2020)
- Annual TEUs: 280848 (2006)
- Website www.portofalaska.com

The Port of Alaska (POA) is a deep-water port in Anchorage, Alaska, with three bulk carrier berths, two petroleum berths, and one barge berth. The name was changed from "Port of Anchorage" to the "Port of Alaska" in 2017. It is an enterprise department of the Municipality of Anchorage. It is distinguished from other types of municipal departments largely because it generates enough revenue to support its operations without being a burden to Anchorage property tax payers, and it also pays a fee-in-lieu of taxes to help run city government.

The POA provides critical transportation infrastructure to the citizens of Anchorage and to a majority of the citizens of the State of Alaska both within and beyond the Railbelt. Seventy-four percent of all the waterborne freight and ninety-five percent of the refined petroleum products entering the state through south-central Alaska ports is shipped through the Port of Alaska. This includes 100 percent of the jet fuel supplied to Joint Base Elmendorf-Richardson and approximately 66 percent of the jet fuel for Ted Stevens Anchorage International Airport.

The Port Director is appointed by the Mayor and reports to the Municipal Manager. There is a nine-person Commission, also appointed by the Mayor, responsible for promulgating the Port's terminal tariff. Despite its enterprise distinction, the Port acts as a standard municipal department with the Anchorage Assembly approving its annual budget, contracts, tariffs, and leases. Additionally, needed legal, financial and other day-to-day support are provided, for a fee, by the appropriate general government departments acting as an extension of the Port's staff. All Port operating activities are subject to municipal code.

== Geography ==
The Port of Alaska is located on the Anchorage side of the Knik Arm of the Cook Inlet on the Pacific Ocean.

A 128.96-acre (52.19 ha) industrial park adjoins the port to the east. Approximately 80.87 acres (32.73 ha) of the park are under long-term lease to various port users. Additionally, there are 31.0 acres (12.5 ha) for the staging and storage of marine cargo in transit. However, a majority of that acreage is presently occupied by the two major general cargo carriers.

=== Climate ===
The Port of Alaska has operated year-round through extreme climate and tides.

==== Ice ====
Typically between October and November, pan ice develops in the Knik Arm of the Cook Inlet but does not fully freeze over for the winter.

Between March and May, the pan ice melts.

Since opening day in 1961, the Port of Alaska has been able to accommodate a regular schedule of cargo delivery to Alaska's Railbelt. Operations have never been stopped due to icy conditions.

== History ==
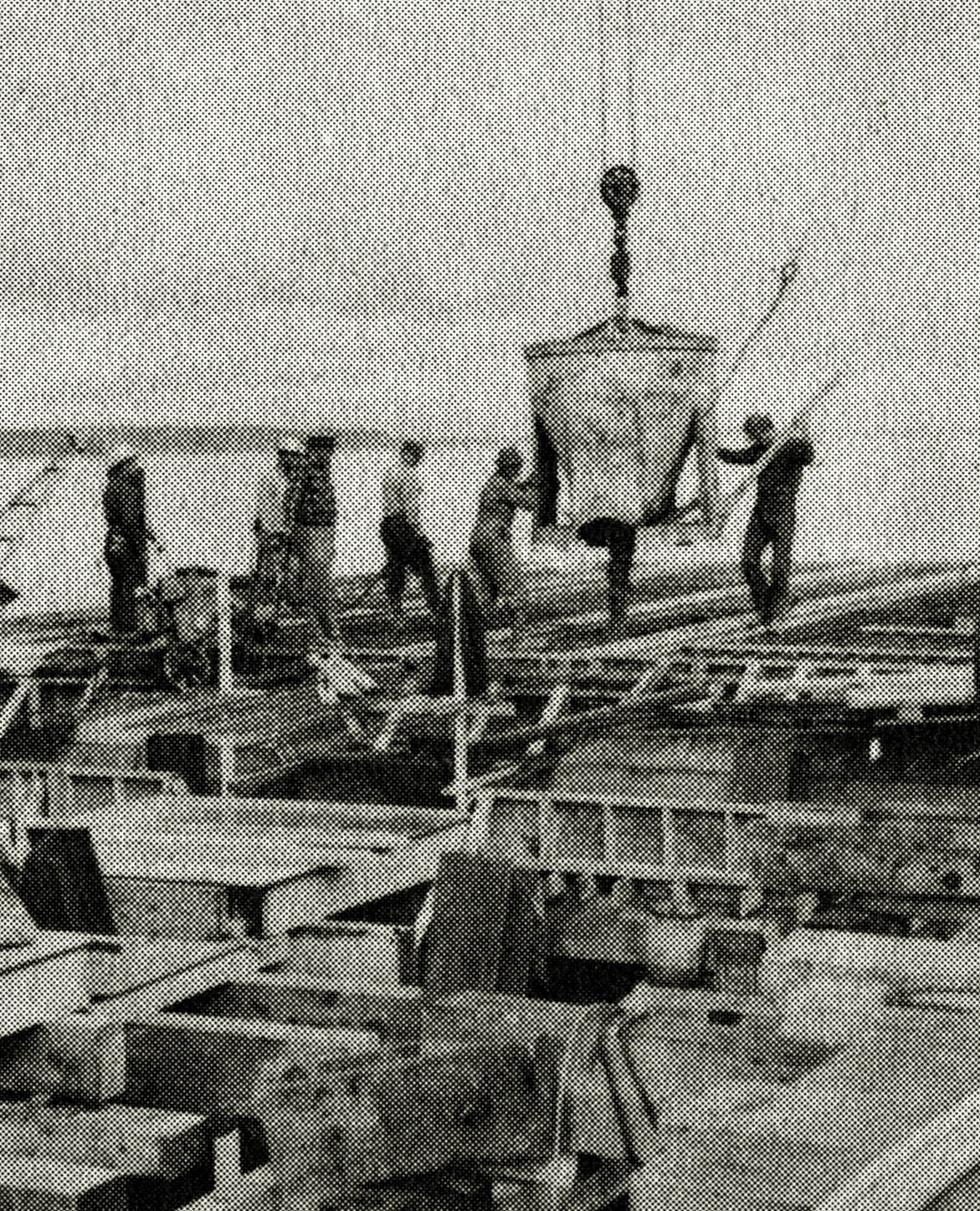
The first concrete being poured in September 1959. Initial construction was delayed first by the loss at sea of most of the pilings, followed by a strike by carpenters.

The Port of Alaska began operations in September 1961, and in its first year over 38,000 tons of marine cargo moved across its single berth. It was the only port in South Central Alaska to survive the 1964 Good Friday earthquake and became the main shipping hub for consumer and essential goods entering southcentral Alaska. The Port has since expanded to a five-berth terminal providing facilities for the movement of containerized freight, iron and steel products, bulk petroleum, and cement. The peak of the port's operations occurred in 2005 when, for the first time, more than 5 million tons of various commodities moved across its docks. The port celebrated its 50th year of service in 2011.

In the late 1990s, following studies of then-existing and projected future needs, geotechnical and structural design studies and an Environmental Assessment prepared under the direction of the U.S. Maritime Administration (MARAD), the final Environmental Assessment identified a proprietary design known as Open Cell Sheet Pile (OCSP) as the preferred alternative for the wharf and berthing area of the new expansion project. Construction began in 2006 in an area known as the North Backlands. Installation of the OCSP system began in 2008, the result of which was creation of a barge berth and approximately 60 acres of new land.

The existing port was substantially built in the late 1950s and is reaching the end of its useful life. Beginning in 2017, the Port of Alaska is undertaking an extensive 7-year Anchorage Port Modernization Project to upgrade its aging infrastructure, support larger deeper draft vessels, and future proof the port seismically and environmentally for another 75 years.

== Carriers ==
Anchorage is served regularly by two major carriers, Matson Navigation Company (formerly Horizon Lines, Inc.) and Totem Ocean Trailer Express (TOTE), which bring four to five ships weekly from Tacoma, Washington. Petroleum tankers supply jet fuel for airport operations, barges on-load petroleum products for western and Interior Alaska, and ships from Japan and Korea call frequently, transporting construction materials, pipeline for the north slope, or loading refined petroleum.

== Connections ==
=== Rail ===
Direct connection to Alaska Railroad, a Class II railroad serving South Central Alaska and Interior Alaska.

=== Truck ===
Nearby truck access to the Alaska intrastate highway routes:

- Alaska Route 1 North-East bound, the Glenn Highway to either:

- Alaska Route 4, the Richardson Highway North-bound to Fairbanks or South-bound to Valdez/Cordova.
- Alaska Route 3 North-bound, the George Parks Highway to Wasilla, Houston, Willow, Talkeetna/Trapper Creek, Cantwell, Denali, Healy, Anderson/Clear, Nenana and Fairbanks.
- Alaska Route 2, the Alaska Highway from Tok to Fairbanks or Yukon Territory, Canada.

- Alaska Route 1 South-West bound, the Seward Highway to either:

- Whittier Tunnel and Whittier, Alaska
- Alaska Route 1, the Sterling Highway to Sterling, Soldotna, and Homer.
- Alaska Route 9, the Seward Highway to Seward.

- Alaska State Routes.

== Facilities ==
=== Maritime services ===
Port facilities include three cargo terminals and two petroleum terminals. Gantry Crane and roll-on, roll-off capability On terminal Class 1 rail service Immediate major Alaska highway access Experienced, 24/7 security force Expertise handling multi-modal project cargo Over 50 years supporting Alaska in cargo, cement, fuel, etc.

Docks are maintained at a full seaway depth, which is 35 feet (11 m) to 45 feet (14 m).

The docks have excellent direct connections with the Alaska Railroad, and highway connections to Alaska intrastate highway routes.

== Cargo ==
	2007	2008	2009	2010	2011	2012	2013	2014
Dry Bulk Goods	124,089	116,789	81,494	109,228	118,280	119,939	119,271	140,684
Petroleum, NOS	2,618	2,648	2,032	1,660	2,052	1,454	2,615	2,031
Vans/Flats/Containers	1,785,518	1,831,816	1,713,086	1,736,943	1,705,176	1,658,813	1,742,704	1,811,136
Vehicles	5,381	10,725	1,473	0	864	0	0	0
Petroleum, Shoreside	1,698,581	1,830,848	1,426,711	1,192,705	1,376,909	1,046,636	952,631	916,050
Petroleum, Bulk-Dockside	699,727	577,236	573,352	922,426	931,931	829,900	586,041	580,343
Total Tons	4,315,913	4,370,061	3,798,148	3,962,962	4,135,211	3,656,741	3,403,261	3,450,243

== See also ==
- List of North American ports
- List of ports in the United States

== Notes ==
A: TEU means Twenty-foot equivalent units. Foreign empties are not included.
