= Alaskan Brewing Company =

Brewery in Juneau, Alaska

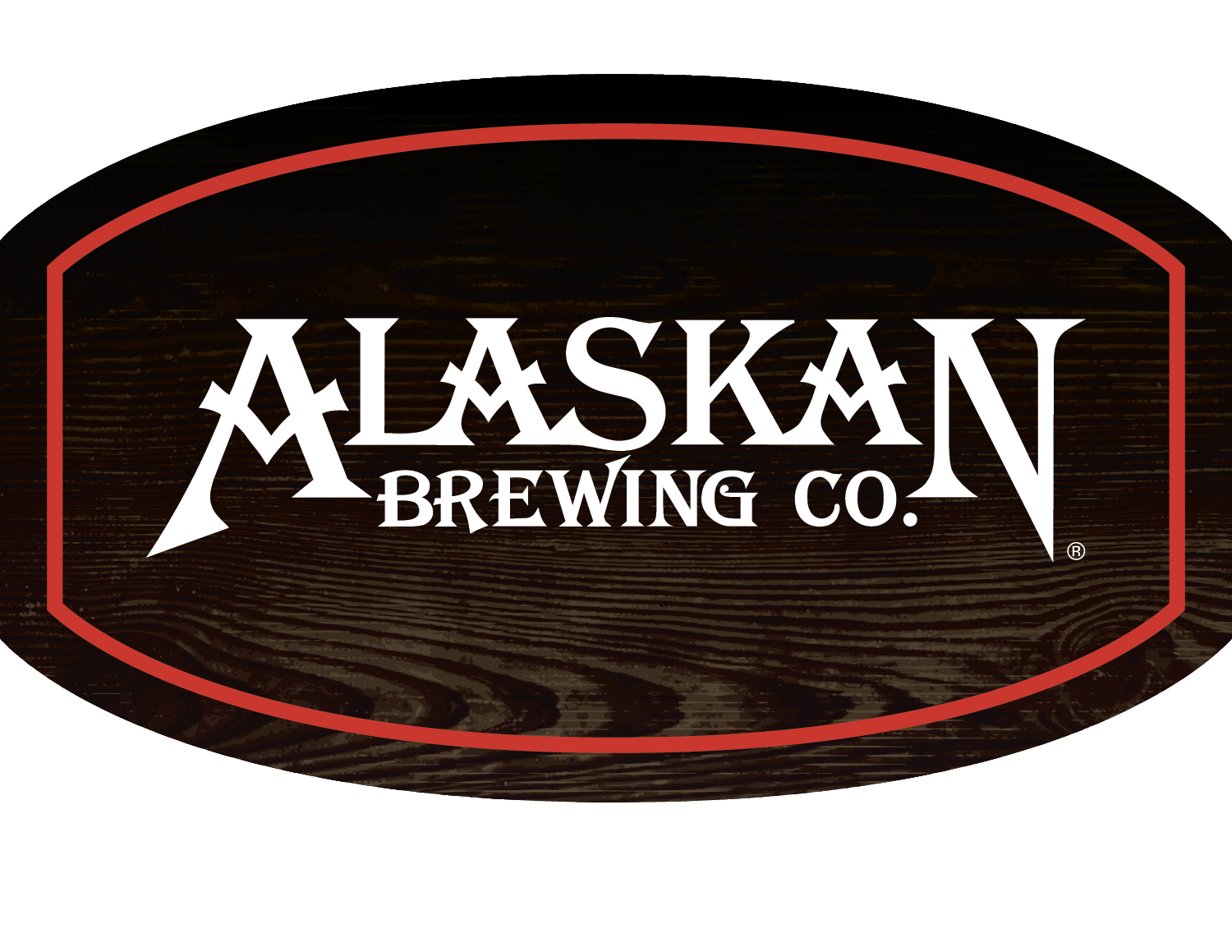

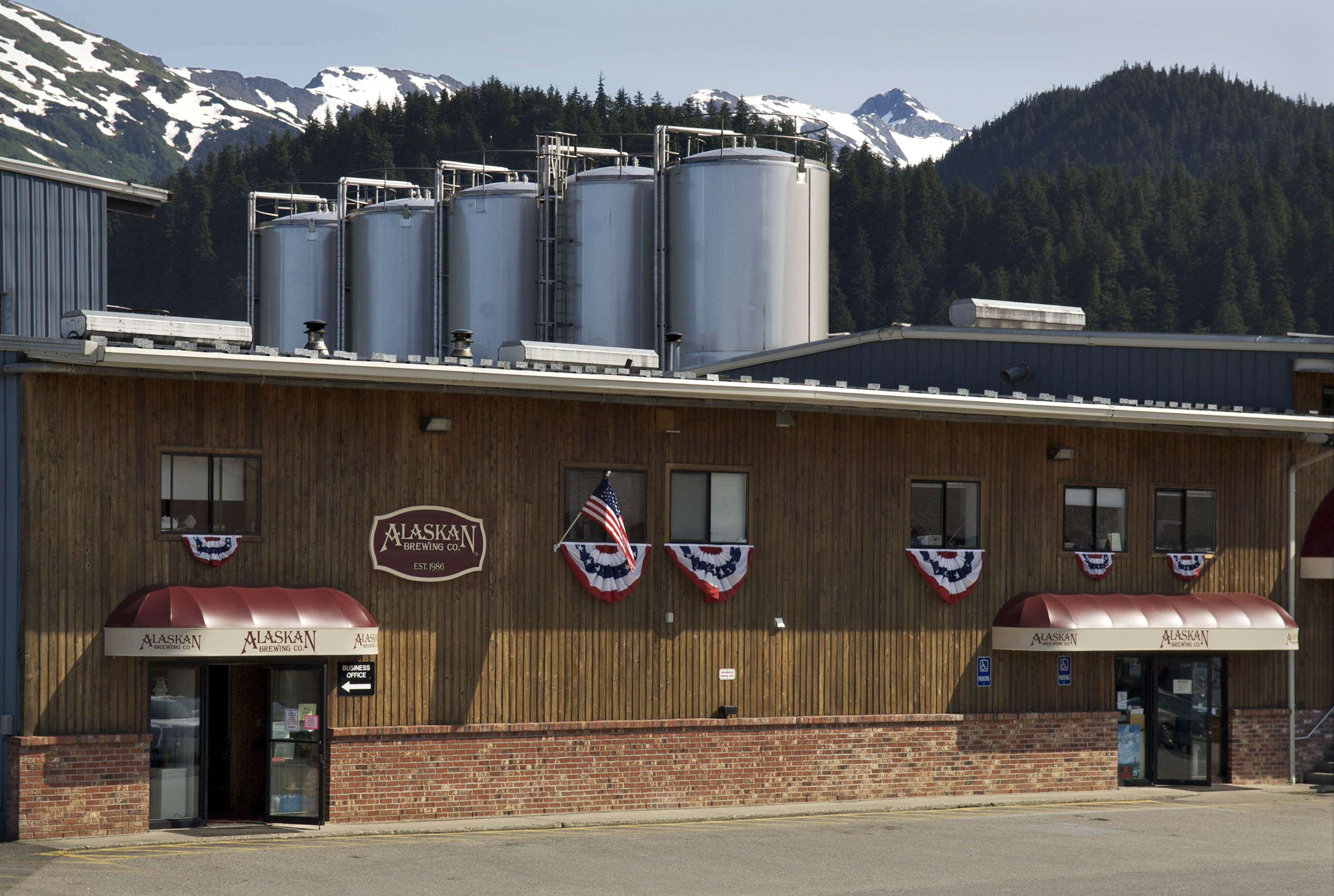
- Industry: Alcoholic beverage
- Founded: 1986
- Headquarters: Juneau, Alaska, United States 58°21′26″N 134°29′22″W
- Products: Beer
- Owner: Geoff and Marcy Larson
- Website: www.alaskanbeer.com

Alaskan Brewing Company is a brewery in Juneau, Alaska, founded in 1986. It was the first brewery in Alaska after Prohibition. The company was originally named Chinook Alaskan Brewing. The company's beers have won awards at regional, national, and international beer competitions.

The brewery was founded by Marcy and Geoff Larson. It was the 20th-largest craft brewery in the United States in 2015.

== Beers ==
The Alaskan Brewing Company brews eight year-round beers, four seasonal beers, and several limited-edition beers. The year-round beers are Alaskan Amber, Freeride APA, Icy Bay IPA, Alaskan White, Hopothermia, Smash Galaxy, and Husky IPA. The seasonal beers are Spruce IPA (January – April), Kölsch (May – August), Cranberry Tart (September – December) and Winter Ale.

Name	Original Gravity	ABV	Bitterness (IBU)	Color (SRM)
Amber Ale	1.054	5.3%	18	22
Icy Bay IPA	1.057	6.2%	65	9
White Ale	1.048	5.3%	15	7
Freeride APA	1.047	5.3%	40	14
Hopothermia	1.076	8.5%	70	20
Smash Galaxy	1.078	8.5%	86	10
Husky IPA	1.060	7.0%	50	5
Smoked Porter	1.068	6.5%	45	92

== See also ==
- Beer in the United States
