= Bethel Regional High School =

Location
- 1 Ron Edwards Memorial Drive; Bethel, Alaska 99559; United States
- Coordinates: 60°48′08″N 161°46′14″W

Information
- School type: Public school high school
- School district: Lower Kuskokwim School District
- CEEB code: 020005
- Principal: Alicia Miner
- Staff: 36.00 (FTE)
- Grades: 7–12
- Enrollment: 410 (2024-2025)
- Language: English
- Hours in school day: 7.75
- Colors: Blue and gold
- Fight song: Fight Warriors Fight
- Mascot: Warrior
- Website: brhs.lksd.org

Bethel Regional High School (BRHS) is a public high school in Bethel, Alaska, United States, and part of the Lower Kuskokwim School District (LKSD). As of August 2013 it had an enrollment of 500. As of 2018 it is the LKSD school with the highest enrollment.

== History ==
On February 19, 1997, a sixteen-year-old student named Evan Ramsey opened fire in the common area. Ramsey used a Mossberg 500 12-gauge shotgun and shot fifteen-year-old student Josh Palacios in the abdomen, who later died shortly after emergency surgery. Two more students were injured before an art teacher, Reyne Athanas attempted to talk Evan into surrendering. After she failed to do so, Evan walked to the main lobby where he would shoot principal Ron Edwards twice, effectively killing him. He would then return to the common area where he took part in a police shootout. Following with his original plan, and placed the barrel of the gun under his chin. Although instead of pulling the trigger, he exclaimed twice "I don't want to die," he threw the gun on the ground and surrendered without a struggle.
