= Point MacKenzie, Alaska =

- CDP
- Location in Matanuska-Susitna Borough and the state of Alaska

- Location within the state of Alaska
- Coordinates: 61°22′30″N 149°54′45″W
- Country: United States
- State: Alaska
- Borough: Matanuska-Susitna

Government
  - Borough mayor: Edna DeVries
  - State senator: Mike Shower (R)
  - State rep.: Kevin McCabe (R)

Area
  - Total: 164.79 sq mi (426.81 km^{2})
  - Land: 162.33 sq mi (420.44 km^{2})
  - Water: 2.46 sq mi (6.37 km^{2})
- Elevation: 213 ft (65 m)

Population (2020)
  - Total: 1,852
  - Density: 11/sq mi (4.4/km^{2})
- Time zone: UTC-9 (Alaska (AKST))
  - Summer (DST): UTC-8 (AKDT)
- Area code: 907
- FIPS code: 02-61788
- GNIS feature ID: 1865561

Point MacKenzie is a census-designated place (CDP) in Matanuska-Susitna Borough, Alaska, United States. It is part of the Anchorage, Alaska Metropolitan Statistical Area. At the 2020 census the population was 1,852, up from 529 in 2010.

== Geography ==
Point MacKenzie is located at 61°22′30″N 149°54′45″W (61.374982, -149.912390).

According to the United States Census Bureau, the CDP has a total area of 150.3 square miles (389 km^{2}), of which, 148.0 square miles (383 km^{2}) of it is land and 2.3 square miles (6.0 km^{2}) of it (1.54%) is water.

== History ==
In the book Shem Pete's Alaska, a collection of recollections about the lives of Upper Cook Inlet Dena'ina Athabascans, Point MacKenzie is identified as Dilhi Tunch’del’usht Beydegh, (“Point where we transport hooligan”), a trade site where the Dghelay Teht'ana ("The Mountain People") of the Talkeetna Mountains would trade with the Dena'ina of the Knik Arm.

Seward's Success was once proposed to be constructed here in the 1970s.

== Demographics ==
Historical population
Census	Pop.	Note	%±
1960	25		—
2000	111		—
2010	529		376.6%
2020	1,852		250.1%
U.S. Decennial Census

Point MacKenzie first reported on the 1960 U.S. Census as the unincorporated village of "McKenzie Point." In this census, first-level divisions of the state were coterminous with state election districts, which included this area along with Anchorage. As a result of redistricting in 1961, it was drawn into the Matanuska-Susitna Borough when the borough was created by the state legislature in 1963. It did not report again until 2000, when it returned as Point MacKenzie, and was made a census-designated place (CDP).

=== 2020 census ===
As of the 2020 census, Point MacKenzie had a population of 1,852. The median age was 40.2 years. 5.7% of residents were under the age of 18 and 7.4% of residents were 65 years of age or older. For every 100 females there were 906.5 males, and for every 100 females age 18 and over there were 1343.0 males age 18 and over.

0.0% of residents lived in urban areas, while 100.0% lived in rural areas.

There were 139 households in Point MacKenzie, of which 39.6% had children under the age of 18 living in them. Of all households, 55.4% were married-couple households, 21.6% were households with a male householder and no spouse or partner present, and 19.4% were households with a female householder and no spouse or partner present. About 25.9% of all households were made up of individuals and 5.1% had someone living alone who was 65 years of age or older.

There were 293 housing units, of which 52.6% were vacant. The homeowner vacancy rate was 0.0% and the rental vacancy rate was 17.0%.

Racial composition as of the 2020 census
Race	Number	Percent
White	847	45.7%
Black or African American	122	6.6%
American Indian and Alaska Native	652	35.2%
Asian	35	1.9%
Native Hawaiian and Other Pacific Islander	42	2.3%
Some other race	34	1.8%
Two or more races	120	6.5%
Hispanic or Latino (of any race)	91	4.9%

=== 2000 census ===
As of the census of 2000, there were 111 people, 39 households, and 26 families residing in the CDP. The population density was 0.8 people per square mile (0.31 people/km^{2}). There were 98 housing units at an average density of 0.7 per square mile (0.27/km^{2}). The racial makeup of the CDP was 91.89% White, 0.90% Black or African American, 3.60% Native American, 1.80% Asian, and 1.80% from two or more races.

There were 39 households, out of which 25.6% had children under the age of 18 living with them, 61.5% were married couples living together, and 30.8% were non-families. 17.9% of all households were made up of individuals, and none had someone living alone who was 65 years of age or older. The average household size was 2.85 and the average family size was 3.26.

In the CDP, the population was spread out, with 28.8% under the age of 18, 8.1% from 18 to 24, 29.7% from 25 to 44, 26.1% from 45 to 64, and 7.2% who were 65 years of age or older. The median age was 38 years. For every 100 females, there were 126.5 males. For every 100 females age 18 and over, there were 154.8 males.

The median income for a household in the CDP was $23,250, and the median income for a family was $69,688. Males had a median income of $46,563 versus $0 for females. The per capita income for the CDP was $23,228. There were 17.4% of families and 22.7% of the population living below the poverty line, including no under eighteens and none of those over 64.
