= Senshi-Con =

Anime convention in Anchorage, Alaska

Coordinates: 61°12′54″N 149°53′38.4″W

- Status: Defunct
- Venue: Dena'ina Civic and Convention Center
- Location: Anchorage, Alaska
- Country: United States
- Inaugurated: 2005
- Most recent: 2023
- Attendance: 3,791 in 2016
- Website: www.senshicon.com

Senshi-Con was an annual three-day anime convention held during September at the Dena'ina Civic and Convention Center in Anchorage, Alaska. The name was a combination of the English word convention and the Japanese word senshi (戦士 in Japanese), meaning warrior. Senshi-Con was Alaska's first anime convention.

== Programming ==
The convention typically offered card gaming, cosplay chess, a cosplay contest, table top games, vendors, video game tournaments, and workshops. Senshi-Con brought an estimated $191,000 to economy of Anchorage, Alaska in 2015.

== History ==
Future voice actor Kira Buckland created Senshi Con in 2005 while president of the West High anime club. The Dimond High video game club was also part of the founding, and the event was held in the West High School cafeteria. Senshi Con in 2006 moved to the University of Alaska Anchorage. Due to continuing growth, the convention moved to the William A. Egan Civic and Convention Center in 2013 and would in addition use space at the Hilton hotel in 2016. The convention moved to the Dena'ina Civic and Convention Center and had food trucks across the street from the event in 2017. Senshi-Con 2020 was cancelled due to the COVID-19 pandemic. The convention returned in 2023.

=== Event history ===
Dates	Location	Atten.	Guests
March 4, 2005	West High School; Anchorage, Alaska	300	
March 18, 2006	UAA Student Union; Anchorage, Alaska	450	
February 24, 2007	UAA Student Union; Anchorage, Alaska	700	Caitlin Glass
February 23, 2008	UAA Student Union; Anchorage, Alaska	1,200	Che Gilson and Brett Uher.
February 21, 2009	UAA Student Union; Anchorage, Alaska	640	Kira Buckland and L33tStr33t Boys.
March 20-21, 2010	UAA Student Union; Anchorage, Alaska	1,000	Laura Bailey, Jakie Cabe, Chris Cason, Leah Clark, and Travis Willingham.
September 24-25, 2011	UAA Student Union; Anchorage, Alaska	1,400	Chris Cason.
September 29-30, 2012	UAA Student Union and Lucy Cuddy Hall; Anchorage, Alaska	1,600	Robert Axelrod
September 28-29, 2013	William A. Egan Civic and Convention Center; Anchorage, Alaska	2,010	Chuck Huber and Katie Tiedrich.
September 27-28, 2014	William A. Egan Civic and Convention Center; Anchorage, Alaska	3,328	Rob DenBleyker, Caitlin Glass, Natalie Rose Hoover, and Dave McElfatrick.
September 26-27, 2015	William A. Egan Civic and Convention Center; Anchorage, Alaska	4,073	Jennifer Cihi, Stefanie DeLeo, Samantha Inoue-Harte, Taliesin Jaffe, and Pannon.
October 1-2, 2016	William A. Egan Civic and Convention Center; Hilton Hotel; Anchorage, Alaska	3,791	Zach Callison, Jessica Nigri, and J. Michael Tatum.
September 30 - October 1, 2017	Dena'ina Civic and Convention Center; Anchorage, Alaska		Steve Blum, Chalk Twins, Ejen Chuang, Mary Elizabeth McGlynn, and Phil Mizuno.
September 21-23, 2018	Dena'ina Civic and Convention Center; Anchorage, Alaska		Johnny Yong Bosch, Kiba, Max Mittelman, Ciarán Strange, and Jeannie Tirado.
September 28-29, 2019	Hilton Anchorage; Anchorage, Alaska		Justin Briner, Leon Chiro, Natalie Rose Hoover, Erica Lindbeck, Xander Mobus, and Ciarán Strange.
September 8-10, 2023	Dena'ina Civic and Convention Center; Anchorage, Alaska		Kira Buckland, Sarah Natochenny, Jessica Nova, and Twinfools.
