= Campbell Lake =

Campbell Lake may refer to:

== Lakes ==
- Campbell Lake, a lake in Anchorage, Alaska
- Campbell Lake (Carver and McLeod counties, Minnesota)
- Campbell Lake, a lake in Scott County, Minnesota
- Campbell Lake, a lake on Vancouver Island, Canada
- Campbell Lake, a lake of the Northwest Territories, Canada

== People ==
- Campbell Lake (footballer) (born 2004), Australian rules footballer

== See also ==
- Kincaid Park, home to Little Campbell Lake in Anchorage, Alaska
