= Bootleggers Cove, Anchorage =

Coordinates: 61°12′59.7″N 149°54′28.3″W

Bootleggers Cove (alternately called "Bootlegger Cove", "Bootleggers' Cove", and "Bootlegger's Cove") is an area of Anchorage, Alaska, just west of Downtown Anchorage and north of the South Addition. Its exact boundaries are controversial. It is served by Inlet View Elementary School, Romig Junior High and West Anchorage High School. Its scenic features include Elderberry Park, the Oscar Anderson House, the Westchester Lagoon, and access to the Tony Knowles Coastal Trail and the Lainie Fleischer Chester Creek Trail. It is located near the tidal flats of Cook Inlet. The Alaska Railroad passes between the residential zones of Bootleggers Cove and the tidal flats. Bootlegger's Cove was affected by the 1964 Alaska earthquake. It is currently represented in the Alaska State Legislature by Representative Les Gara and Senator Johnny Ellis.

In 2003 Bootlegger Cove resident Bethany Correira was kidnapped, and her body was later found abandoned by a roadside north of Anchorage. Her employer and landlord, Michael Lawson, was eventually convicted of her kidnapping and murder.

== History ==
Many parts of Alaska had outlawed the sale, ownership, or use of alcohol, beginning in 1867 after the US Army took over custody of the new territory. Anchorage became a prime spot for smugglers trying to import alcoholic beverages after its choice as a railroad/shipping port was established in 1914. However, Anchorage had strict laws during the time of Prohibition, introduced by President Woodrow Wilson, who wanted to protect the "morality and sobriety" of the new-found city. According to his plan, land was sectioned off in a grid pattern and auctioned to the people, but would be repossessed if anyone was caught breaking the ban against alcohol. Thereafter, an area along the coast near the Chester Creek outlet became a popular spot for bootleggers smuggling in alcohol, to bring their booty ashore, due to it being around a bend from Ship Creek and thus out of sight from authorities, earning it the name Bootleggers Cove.
