= Westchester Lagoon =

Artificial lake near Anchorage, Alaska, U.S.

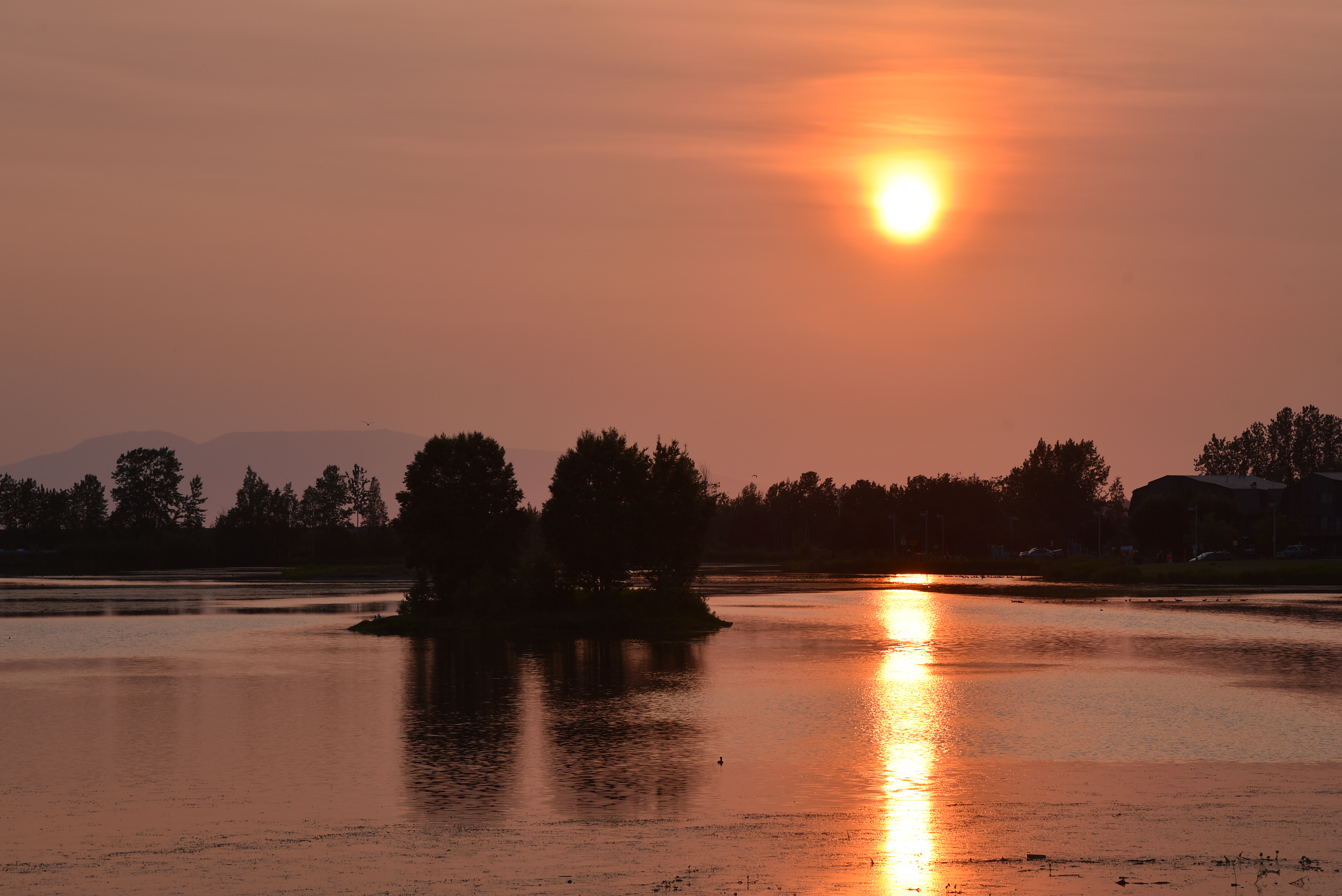
- Westchester Lagoon in the evening, seen looking west

- Location within Alaska Location within North America
- Location: Anchorage, Alaska, United States
- Coordinates: 61.2055427°N 149.9183872°W
- Type: Reservoir
- Primary inflows: Chester Creek watershed
- Primary outflows: Cook Inlet
- Islands: 2

The Westchester Lagoon is a combination of two artificial lakes which form a coastal lagoon near Downtown Anchorage, Alaska. On the lagoons western end, a raised, earthen levee offers right of way for the Alaska Railroad. The levee separates the lagoon from Cook Inlet's Knik Arm, although a large culvert allows spawning salmon swimming upstream from Cook Inlet to use the Chester Creek outflow they will find there. The Tony Knowles Coastal Trail system passes this end of the lagoon, before turning east and passing the Bootleggers Cove neighborhood to the north of the lagoon and continuing further inland into Anchorage. The lagoons eastern boundary is Spenard Road. To the south are single and multi-family homes, Hillcrest Drive and West Anchorage High School. The lagoon is bisected by Minnesota Drive, forming two distinct lakes.

The lagoon, as well as its man-made islands and parks make up the Margaret Eagan Sullivan Park. Since 1975, the Municipality of Anchorage has designated the park a waterfowl sanctuary.

== History ==
In the early 1960s, the Municipality of Anchorage began implementing plans to protect the Chester Creek watershed, a system of creeks that carry rain and melt-water from the slopes of the nearby Chugach Mountains, incorporating the area into an urban renewal plan for the city in 1963. The railroad levee was built in 1968, and the city subsequently expanded the area by buying property along the areas perimeter in 1974. In 1975, the area was designated a bird sanctuary, and three man-made islands were completed. Also in 1975, the Alaska Department of Fish and Game and the Audubon Society planted native grasses in the area. In 1976, the city began forming plans to restore the natural habitat of the area, which was completed in 1977. In 1978, the lagoon was drained to allow crews to remove one of the three islands. Vandals targeted the lagoon in 1979, opening locks on the levee, and draining the lagoon. The city responded by installing a more secure system.

On September 30, 1993, the lagoon and surrounding parkland were rededicated as the Margaret Eagan Sullivan Park, named after the late wife of former Anchorage Mayor George M. Sullivan.

== Recreational use ==
In addition to its function as a bird sanctuary and part of the local trail system, Westchester Lagoon is a popular recreation area. During the winter months, when the lagoon is frozen over, it is used as an ice skating rink, which is groomed and maintained by the city. A disc golf course runs through the lagoon area, and a snack bar operates during the summer months.

== Gallery ==
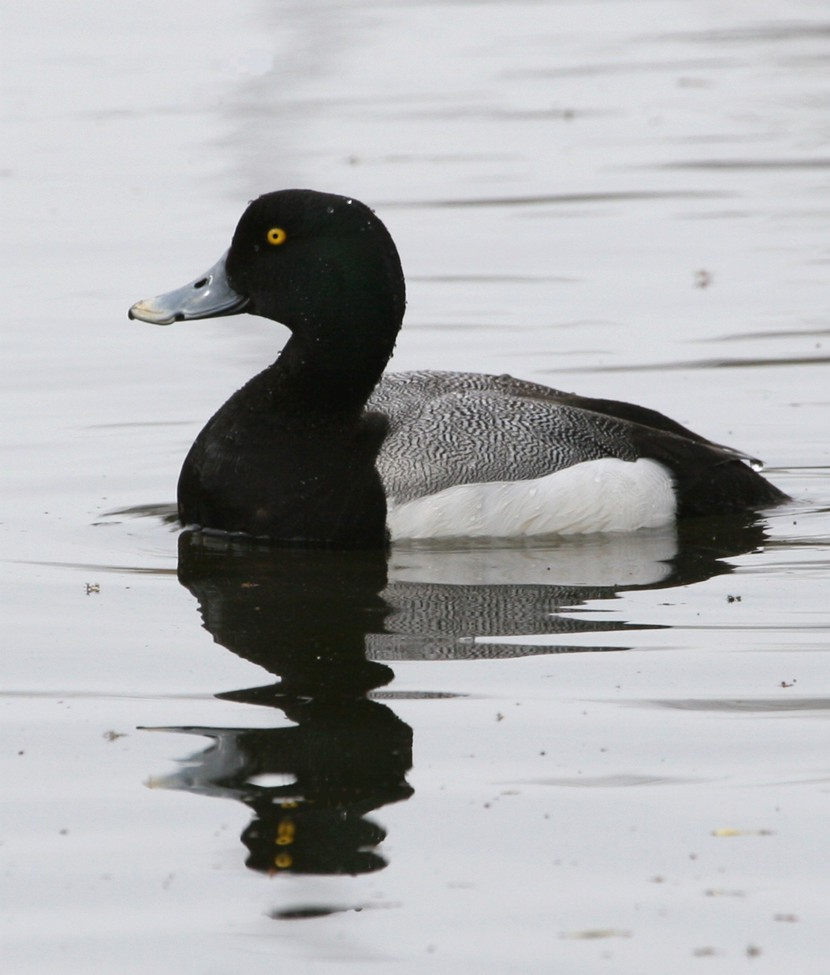
A greater scaup swimming in Westchester Lagoon

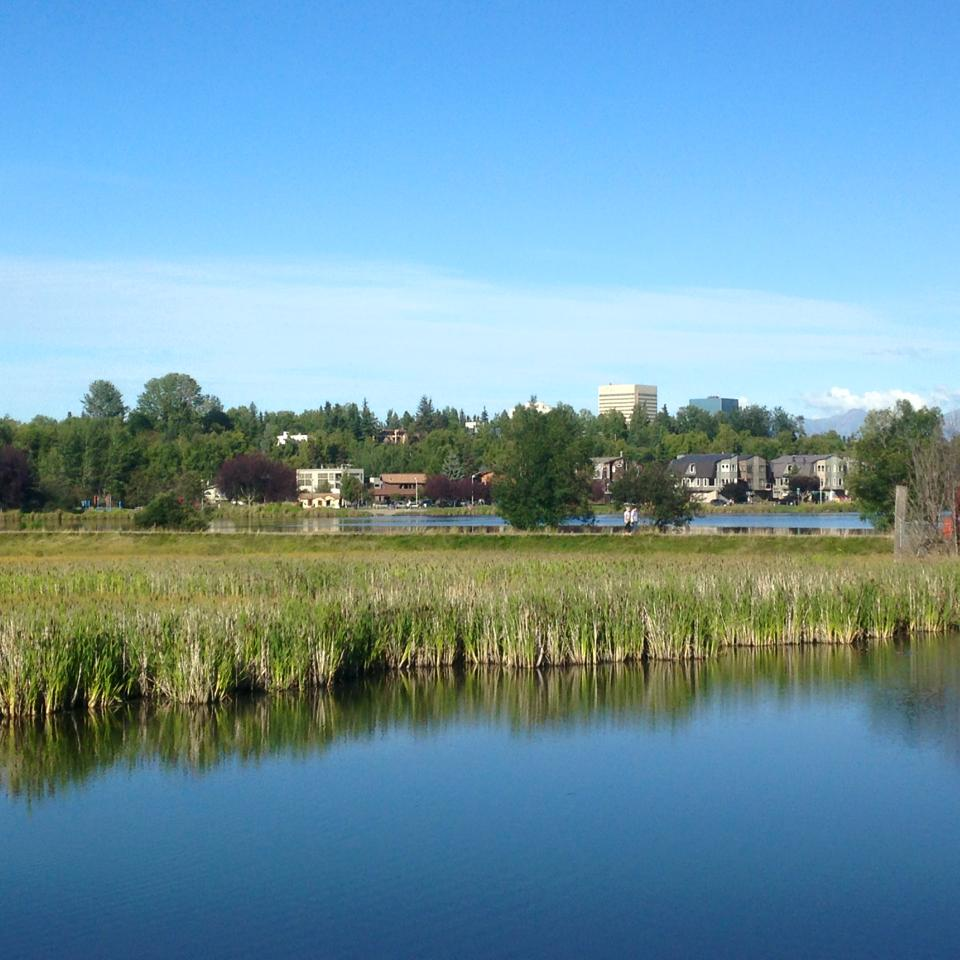
The Anchorage skyline, seen looking north from Westchester Lagoon
