= West Anchorage High School =

Location
- 1700 Hillcrest Drive; Anchorage, Alaska 99517; United States; 61°12′02″N 149°54′59″W

Information
- Type: Public high school
- Established: 1953 (73 years ago)
- School district: Anchorage School District
- CEEB code: 020000
- Principal: Jason Dorris
- Teaching staff: 84.82 (FTE)
- Grades: 9–12
- Enrollment: 1,768 (2023–2024)
- Student to teacher ratio: 20.84
- Colors: Orange and black
- Athletics: Ranked 4A (large school) by the Alaska School Activities Association
- Mascot: Eagles
- Newspaper: Eagle's Cry; Eagle's Quill
- Yearbook: The Anchor
- Website: www.asdk12.org/west
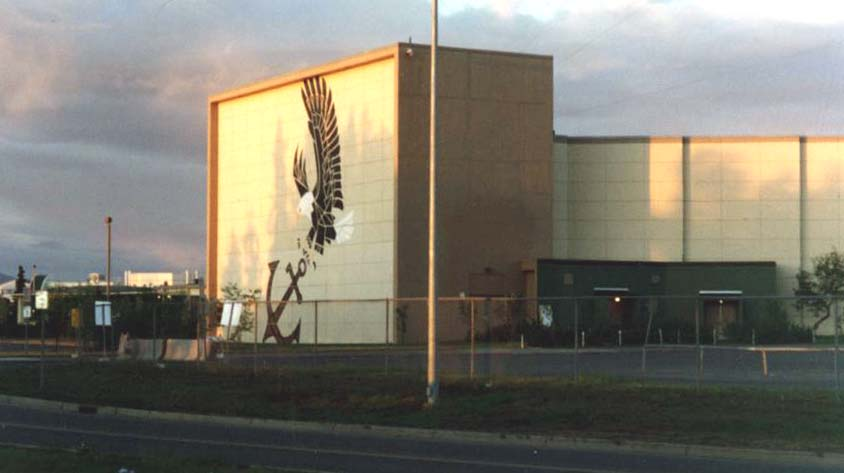
- West High School in May 1997, showing its auditorium. View looking southerly from the Westchester Lagoon overlook at Margaret Eagan Sullivan Park.

West Anchorage High School (formerly Anchorage High School) is a public high school in Anchorage, Alaska. The school is part of the Anchorage School District (ASD). Opened in 1953, West is the oldest of ASD's eight major high schools. Serving the western parts of downtown and midtown Anchorage, in 2020-2021 it had an enrollment of 1,754.This makes West Anchorage High School the high school with the highest student enrollment in Alaska, edging East Anchorage High School out by 44 students, which enrolled 1,710 students.

== History ==
The school was established as Anchorage High School in 1953, during a boom period in Anchorage. Anchorage had gone from having one school, to having to hold classes in World War II-surplus Quonset huts, in less than a decade due to the rapid population influx to Anchorage, which was centered upon WWII, the Cold War and related construction activity at Elmendorf Air Force Base and Fort Richardson. The Anchorage Independent School District (AISD), which consolidated the incorporated area of Anchorage with adjacent outlying areas for the purpose of providing education services, was formed in 1947 in response to this boom and the strain it placed upon public services, particularly education. A period of heightened school construction in the Anchorage area would follow throughout the 1950s.

The school was built in a part of Anchorage known as Romig Hill, in the northwest corner of what later became Spenard. Just five years before the school's construction, this area was largely rural, populated by cabins and farms. The nearby KENI Radio Building constructed by Austin E. Lathrop was the only substantial construction in the area until the Spenard Public Utility District (PUD) was formed. Public utility districts, like independent school districts, were devised by the territorial legislature to address systemic problems inherent in municipal government at the time, which hampered providing services to growing communities. The school itself was not within the corporate limits of Anchorage at the time of its construction (those limits ended at 16th Avenue, the southern limit of the original townsite reserve), but would later be annexed by Anchorage. Following the Spenard PUD's formation, the area immediately surrounding the school saw a building boom, largely due to the efforts of real estate developers such as Earl and Wally Hickel.

The year after the school opened, Anchorage Community College (ACC), the lineal predecessor of the University of Alaska Anchorage, began holding classes in the building as well. ACC continued to use the building until they moved to the campus built in the Goose Lake neighborhood (an area now known as the University-Medical District, or U-Med for short) in the early 1970s. The school's name would change from Anchorage High School to West Anchorage High School following the opening of East Anchorage High School in 1961. AISD headquarters were located adjacent to the school, at what was (at the time) the northern end of Minnesota Drive. This building is currently home to the data processing facility of ASD.

== Building ==
West Anchorage High School is adjacent to Romig Middle School and is connected to Romig by a hallway. The schools share a library and running track, the former of which was designed and built as a joint library for both schools. The school's original library, known in later years as "The Cove", has served primarily as classroom space in the years since. The school's gifted and talented programs were held in this part of the school for many years.

The Good Friday earthquake of March 27, 1964, destroyed most of the school's second floor, as well as damaging the first floor. Currently, the band/orchestra and choir rooms are all that is left of the second floor. The destruction was a determining factor in the design of Dimond High School and Chugiak High School, both of which were built in the years immediately following the earthquake.

The school's science wing was added in 1996 with an indoor planetarium and eight science classrooms with attached labs. A major renovation to the school in 1998 added a new hallway, classrooms, a pool and additional lockers.

=== Auditorium and gymnasium ===
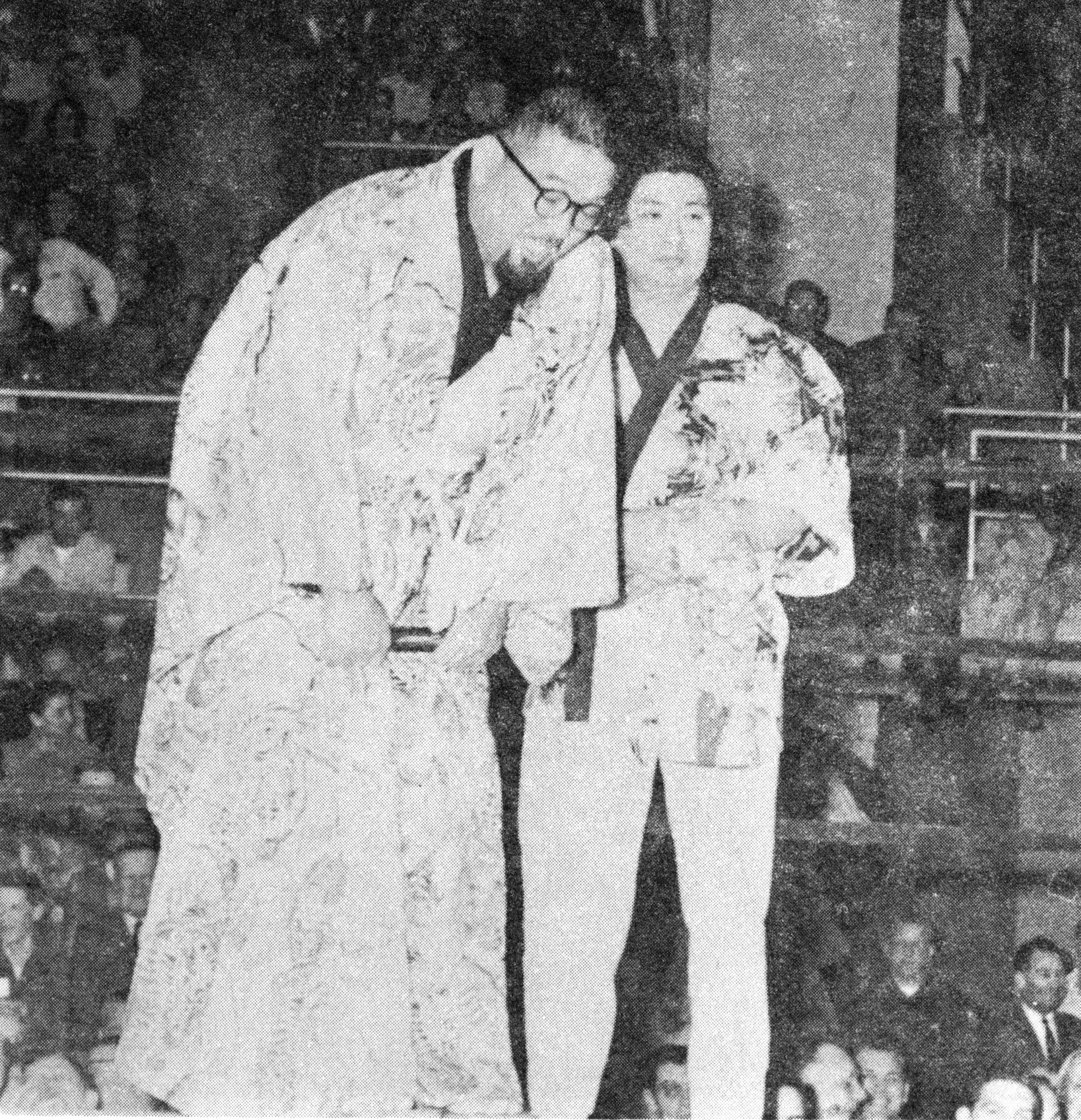
Mr. Moto prior to his match against Sándor Szabó in February 1958.

West High is also home to a 2,000 seat auditorium, the largest of any high school in Alaska. From the time of its construction in 1954 until 1984, it was the largest meeting space in the city.

The auditorium hosted many events and concerts including Steppenwolf, the Paul Taylor Dance Company, A Prairie Home Companion (1986), Ozzy Osbourne, Blue Öyster Cult (the first of many appearances the band made in Alaska between 1980 and 1999), Bee Gees, Ted Nugent, Nazareth (1983), Ray Charles, Johnny Cash and Itzhak Perlman, and Bill Nye the science guy (2014). The Grateful Dead held their only Alaska concerts in the auditorium over the summer solstice, on June 19 through 21, 1980. In 2008, renovations were completed that refurbished the entirety of the auditorium.

The gym seats up to 4,500 people for events which accommodate floor seating. Professional wrestling matches, usually booked and headlined by Sándor Szabó and featuring other wrestling talent based in Southern California, were a staple of the Fur Rendezvous Festival from the mid 1950s through the early 1960s. The wrestling card on February 20, 1959, an impromptu event stemming from a televised angle earlier in the week and which saw Szabó and Count Billy Varga defeat Lord James Blears and Mr. Moto, drew the largest indoor paid attendance of any event in Alaska's history to that point.

From 1977 to 1982, the West Anchorage High gymnasium was home to the Anchorage Northern Knights, a professional basketball team that played in the Continental Basketball Association (which operated under the name Eastern Basketball Association in the team's first season). Among the team's players were Brad Davis, who would go on to play 12 seasons for the Dallas Mavericks, and Ron Davis, who was MVP of the CBA in 1980. The team won the CBA championship in 1980, defeating the Rochester Zeniths in seven games. Knights teams would typically start and end each CBA season with lengthy homestands, with a weeks-long bus trip in between for road games in faraway CBA cities.

A worship rally held in the gym in 1978, organized by the East Anchorage-based Anchorage Baptist Temple and headlined by keynote speaker Paul Harvey, raised the public profile of the church substantially. The church's pastor, Jerry Prevo, was largely unknown at the time outside of the sphere of influence of his congregation. Prevo and his parishioners would become well known in Anchorage shortly thereafter for their role in establishing the Moral Majority in Alaska and their active involvement in Republican Party politics.

Until the construction of the Sullivan Arena and the Egan Center, under what Anchorage titled "Project 80s," the West High auditorium and gymnasium were the primary venues in Anchorage for many concerts and other similar events. The only other venues in Anchorage which could accommodate sizable crowds were the Anchorage Sports Arena, a large Quonset hut-type structure at the corner of Fireweed Lane and A Street (which has housed retail businesses since 1980), and the Buckner Fieldhouse on Fort Richardson (now part of Joint Base Elmendorf-Richardson). Following the opening of the Sullivan Arena and the Egan Center, ASD largely stopped renting the venues to commercial promoters. Many events (including concerts) associated with fundraising for nonprofit organizations continue to be held at the school, however.

=== Eagle emblem ===
The original 1953 floor tile bearing the school's seal (eagle logo and name) is kept well-preserved, and encircled by a chain barrier. The iconic eagle on the front of the auditorium was painted by local artist Werner Stutzer and presented to the school by the class of 1971. That eagle painting opened the floodgates for many other schools, throughout the Anchorage area and as far away as Nome, Alaska, to request similar installations for their mascots.

=== Renovations ===
In 2008, the Alaska Legislature appropriated $900,000 to create a master plan for redeveloping West Anchorage High School and Romig Middle School as 21st century schools in a center of community.

Both West and Romig's Parent Teacher Student Associations, and the eight Anchorage community councils within the attendance area of the schools, have supported redeveloping the campus consistent with the Pre-Planning Vision Report completed in the spring of 2008.

The planning process moved forward in November 2008 with a community wide effort to define the 21st-century educational programs for West and Romig as well as to design the campus as a center of community. Meetings were scheduled over the next year, seeking input from the schools, teachers, parents, students, the municipality, businesses, non-profit agencies, and community as a whole. The planning process was scheduled to be completed in December 2009 with sufficient detail to design, finance, and redevelop both schools to meet the educational needs of the 21st century and become a center of community.

In the latter half of the 2010s, a two story Career and Technical Education (C&TE) wing was added, allowing classes in Health Sciences, Multimedia and Process Technology to be added to the curriculum. This would be the first time part of the second floor would be added to the school since the 1964 Good Friday earthquake, albeit neither section of the second floor is directly connected to each other.

== Academics ==
West High is attended by approximately 2,000 students in grades 9-12, instructed by roughly 125 faculty. Its mascot is the eagle and its colors are orange and black. Class colors are yellow (freshmen) and alternate to blue, red, and green for three consecutive years after students reach their sophomore year.

=== International Baccalaureate ===
West High has been an International Baccalaureate World School since February 2004, students complete IB classes in six subject areas. and is currently the only high school in the Anchorage School District with an International Baccalaureate program. Nine students graduated from the program in May 2023.

=== School Through the Arts ===
West is also home to the School Through the Arts program, which integrates the study of arts into high school courses. Freshmen take STTA history and English classes, as well as an STTA art studio course. Sophomores take the STTA history and English courses, and other non-STTA arts classes. Juniors and seniors continue taking arts classes but take their history and English classes in the normal school program.

== Extracurricular activities ==
=== Sports ===
West is home to a number of sports competing in the Cook Inlet Conference. They include football, soccer, cross-country running, Nordic skiing, volleyball, tennis, hockey, and track & field.

=== Publications ===
The school newspaper, the Eagle's Cry, is an online publication with content written by student members of the eponymous club. The school's creative writing magazine is the Eagle's Quill.

=== Yearbook ===
The school's yearbook is The Anchor.

=== Drama, Debate, and Forensics ===
West's competitive Drama, Debate, and Forensics team competes in the Alaska School Activities Association's state championship 4A division.

=== Theatre ===
West's theatre program was accepted as a representative of the American High School Theatre Festival at the Edinburgh Festival Fringe in August 2007, where they performed Moby Dick! The Musical. West was the first high school from the state of Alaska nominated to attend the festival. The theatre program was invited to perform in the festival a total of four times (the most of any Alaskan school), most recently in 2010, performing "Seussical: The Musical."

== Notable alumni ==
(includes alumni of Anchorage High School prior to the construction of West)

- Kira Buckland (1987–), voice actress, notably for video games and anime dubs, founder of Senshi-Con
- Ty Conklin (1976–), NHL goaltender, Detroit Red Wings
- Eric Croft (1964–), class of 1982, attorney and Democratic politician, Anchorage School Board
- David Cuddy (1952–), class of 1970, retired banker, businessman and Republican politician
- Anna Dalton (1989–), class of 2008, long-distance runner
- Mike Doogan (1948–), class of 1966, writer, former columnist for the Anchorage Daily News, retired member of the Alaska House of Representatives
- Greg Fisk (1945–2015), class of 1963, former mayor of Juneau, Alaska
- James Gottstein, class of 1971, attorney involved in psychiatry issues; member of a prominent pioneer Anchorage family
- George A. Lingo (1901–1976), attended Anchorage High School in its earliest years, graduated from Lincoln High School in Seattle; businessman, politician and government official in territorial days
- William Oefelein (1965–), former NASA astronaut; flew as pilot of the STS-116 space shuttle mission
- Paul O'Neill (1935–2020), class of 1954, 72nd United States Secretary of the Treasury
- Don Simpson (1943–1996), Hollywood film producer
- Bill Stolt (1900–2001), class of 1920, mayor of Anchorage from 1941 to 1944, Anchorage businessman for many decades (most prominently as the owner of Stolt's Home Center)
- Dan Sullivan (1951–), class of 1969, Mayor of Anchorage, 2009–2015
- Kristen Thorsness (1960–), class of 1978, 1984 Los Angeles Olympic gold medalist in the women's eight
- Casey Bailey (1992-), class of 2010, NHL player, Toronto Maple Leafs
- Quinn Christopherson (1992-), class of 2010, transgender activist and winner of NPR Tiny Desk Contest
- JT Thor (2002-), class of 2020 (left after freshman year), NBA player, Charlotte Hornets
- Luke Jager (2000-), class of 2018, Olympic skier 2022 Winter Olympics
- Blythe Marston (1957-), class of 1975, founder of West High Foundation Fund at the Alaska Community Foundation, co-leader of the West-Romig Campus as a School as Center of Community, resulting in a Career, Technology & Education wing being added to the campus as well as on going West High projects supported by the West High Alumni and West High Foundation.
- Tam Agosti-Gisler (1957-), class of 1975, Anchorage School District educator 1982-2004, executive director of the Anchorage School Business Partnership Program 2006-2012, co-leader of the West-Romig Campus as a School as Center of Community, Anchorage School Board 2012-2018 (president for 3 years)

== See also ==
- List of high schools in Alaska
