= Tikishla Peak =

Mountain in Alaska, United States

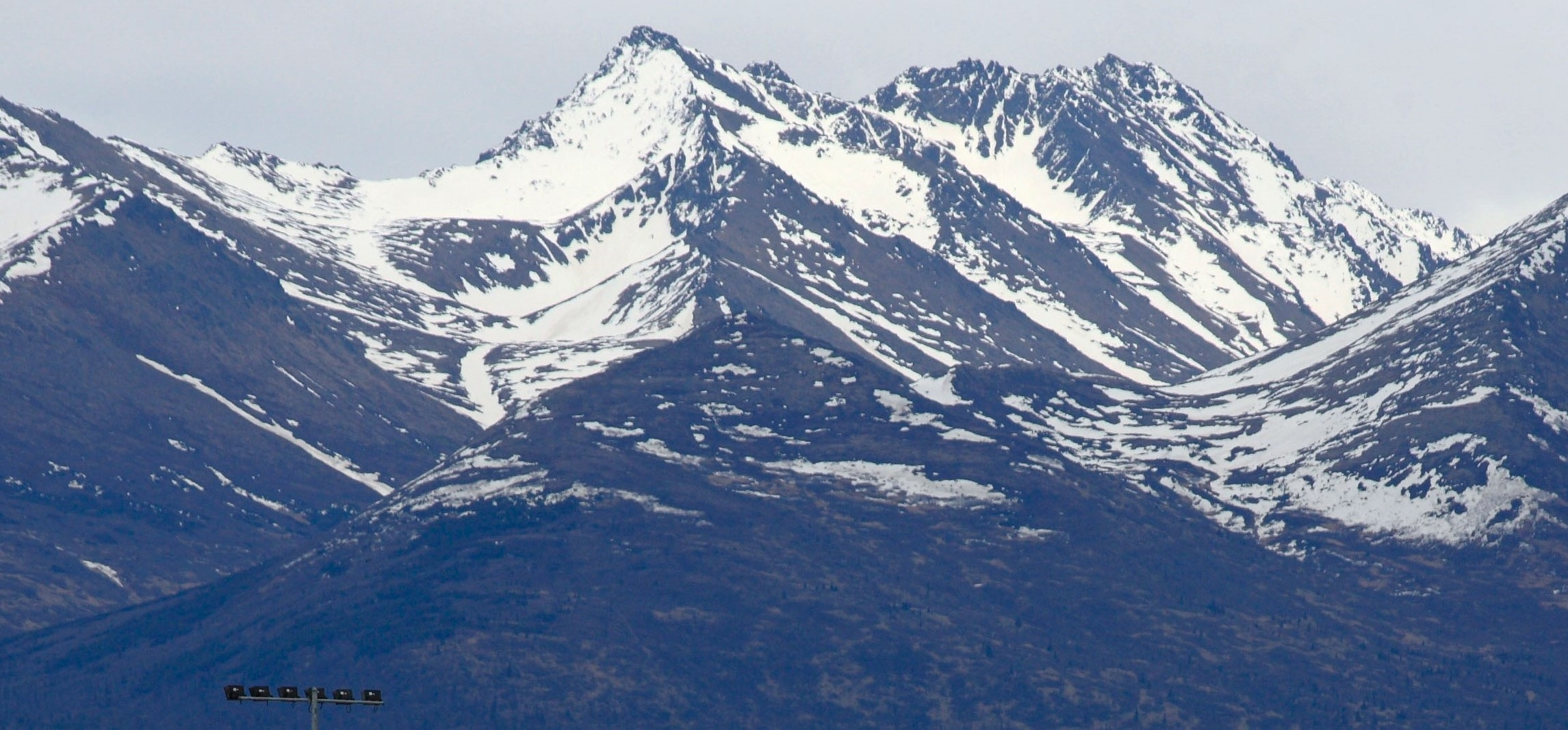
- West aspect

Highest point
- Elevation: 5,229 ft (1,594 m)
- Prominence: 341 ft (104 m)
- Parent peak: Tanaina Peak (5,357 ft)
- Isolation: 1.14 mi (1.83 km)
- Coordinates: 61°08′40″N 149°33′22″W

Geography
- Location within Alaska
- Interactive map of Tikishla Peak
- Country: United States
- State: Alaska
- Borough: Anchorage
- Parent range: Chugach Mountains
- Topo map: USGS Anchorage A-7

Climbing
- Easiest route: Off-trail hiking class 2

Tikishla Peak is a 5,229-foot (1,594 m) mountain summit in the U.S. state of Alaska.

== Description ==
Tikishla Peak is located 11 miles (18 km) east of Anchorage in the western Chugach Mountains, on land belonging to Fort Richardson Military Reservation. Precipitation runoff from the mountain drains west to Cook Inlet via Ship Creek and Campbell Creek. Although modest in elevation, relief is significant as the summit rises approximately 2,300 feet (700 m) above Campbell Creek Canyon in one mile (1.6 km). An ascent of the summit involves hiking 15 miles (round-trip) with 5,200 feet of elevation gain. The months of May through September offer best conditions for climbing the peak. The peak's toponym Tikishla, meaning "black bear", is derived from the Denaʼina language and was proposed in 1965 by the Mountaineering Club of Alaska.

== Climate ==
Based on the Köppen climate classification, Tikishla Peak is located in a subarctic climate zone with long, cold, snowy winters, and mild summers. Weather systems coming off the Gulf of Alaska are forced upwards by the Chugach Mountains (orographic lift), causing heavy precipitation in the form of rainfall and snowfall. Winter temperatures can drop below −10 °F with wind chill factors below −20 °F.

== Gallery ==
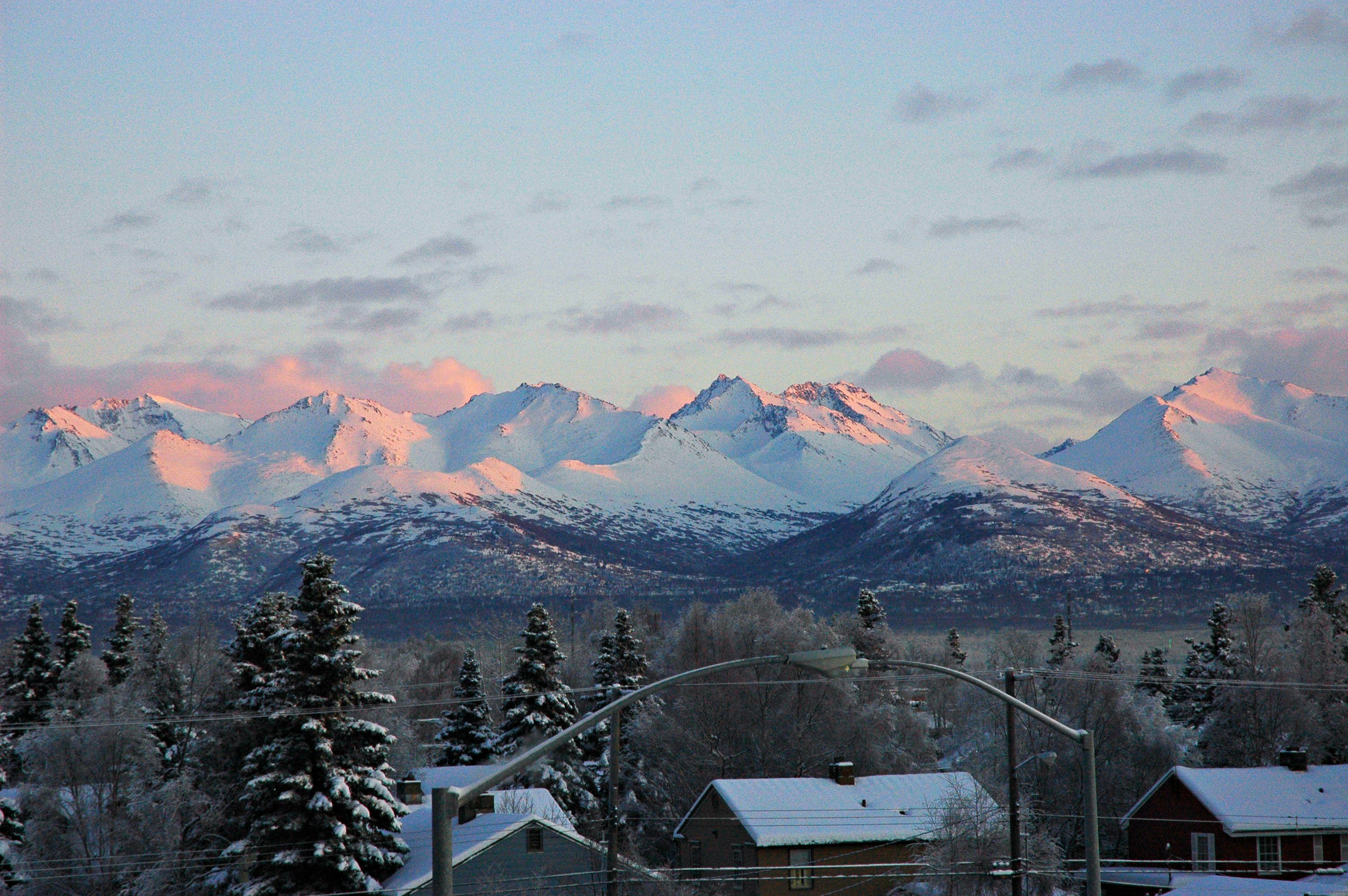
Tikishla Peak from Anchorage

== See also ==
- List of mountain peaks of Alaska
- Geography of Alaska
