= Chester Creek Trail =

Chester Creek Trail may refer to:

- Chester Creek Trail (Alaska)
- Chester Creek Trail (Pennsylvania)
