= Anna Dalton =

American distance runner (born 1989)

Personal information
- Born: 26 November 1989 (age 36) Anchorage, Alaska, U.S.

Sport
- Country: United States
- Event(s): Marathon, Ultramarathon
- College team: Occidental College

Achievements and titles
- Personal best(s): Marathon: 2:44:24; 50K (trail): 6:08:42

Anna Dalton is an American long-distance runner who specializes in ultramarathons and trail races. She competed in the 2020 U.S. Olympic Trials marathon and won the USA Marathon Trail Championship in 2024.

== Early life ==
Dalton grew up in Anchorage, Alaska and attended West Anchorage High School, where she competed in track and cross country. She continued her running career at Occidental College in California. There she captained the cross country team for two years and while majoring in urban and environmental policy.

== Career ==
Dalton initially didn't continue running competitively after graduating from college in 2012; instead she moved to Costa Rica to do ecological research. She started running marathons the following year, placing in the top 50 at the 2013 New York City Marathon. Dalton also finished in the top 50 at the 2015 Boston Marathon.

She logged notable trail race results in 2017, finishing fourth at both the USA Trail Half Marathon Championship and the Rut Mountain 50K.

In 2018, Dalton returned to the roads and ran 2:44:24 at the California International Marathon, which qualified her for the 2020 United States Olympic Trials (marathon). Prior to the Olympic Trails, Dalton recorded a 1:17:11 time at the 2020 Houston Half Marathon. At the 2020 Olympic Trials in Atlanta, Dalton placed 212th of nearly 400 women in a time of 2:49:24.

In 2022, Dalton won the USATF Half Marathon Trail Championship in Wisconsin, alongside men's winner Garrett Heath. The following year, Dalton placed fourth for the second time at the Rut Mountain 50K.

She returned to Wisconsin in September 2024 and won the USATF Marathon Trail Championship in a time of 3:24:02.

== Personal life ==
Dalton lives in Anchorage, Alaska, and since 2014 has worked as the director of grants and programs for the Alaska Conservation Foundation.
