= Charles L. Meach =

American serial killer

- Born: Charles Louman Meach III; October 1, 1947; Traverse City, Michigan, U.S.
- Died: December 9, 2004 (aged 57); Anchorage, Alaska, U.S.
- Conviction: First degree murder (4 counts)
- Penalty: 396 years imprisonment without parole

Details
- Victims: 5
- Span of crimes: 1973–1982
- Country: United States
- State: Alaska
- Date apprehended: May 6, 1982

Charles Louman Meach III (October 1, 1947 – December 9, 2004) was an American serial killer active in Alaska.

== Early life ==
Meach was born in Traverse City, Michigan, to a mother who had schizophrenia. He left home at sixteen to travel and accumulated a long record of minor crimes.

== Murders ==
Meach made his way to Anchorage, Alaska, and in 1973 he beat 22-year-old Robert Johnson, who worked as a grocery clerk, to death in Earthquake Park. He was charged with murder, found not guilty by reason of insanity and sent to Atascadero State Hospital in California. In 1980, psychiatrists decided that his illness was in remission and he was returned to Alaska under the supervision of the Alaska Psychiatric Institute. In 1981, Meach worked several jobs and was enrolled at the University of Alaska.

On May 3, 1982, armed with two revolvers (a .38-caliber and a .41-caliber) that he had bought from a man on the street, he shot four teenagers to death while robbing their campsite in Russian Jack Springs Park; two 19-year-old boys, one 16-year-old girl and one 17-year-old girl. The teens were planning on going to the movies, when Meach shot them. He confessed to the killings when confronted and was charged. Meach again pleaded not guilty by reason of insanity, but was convicted and sentenced to 396 years in prison without the possibility of parole — the longest sentence in the state's history.

== Aftermath ==
In response to the shootings, the Alaska Legislature revised the criminal statutes on the sentencing of the mentally ill, providing for a new verdict "guilty, but mentally ill" where the convicted will serve their time in a mental institution until deemed healthy, then be transferred to prison for the rest of their sentence. This revision did not apply to Meach's trial, or consequently his sentence. The legislature also narrowed the definition of insanity and tightened the burden of proof for the basic insanity defense. This resulted in Alaska having one of the strictest conditions for the insanity defense of all US states.

Meach died of natural causes on December 9, 2004, in the Cook Inlet jail.

== See also ==
- List of serial killers in the United States
