= Kira Buckland =

American voice actress (born 1987)

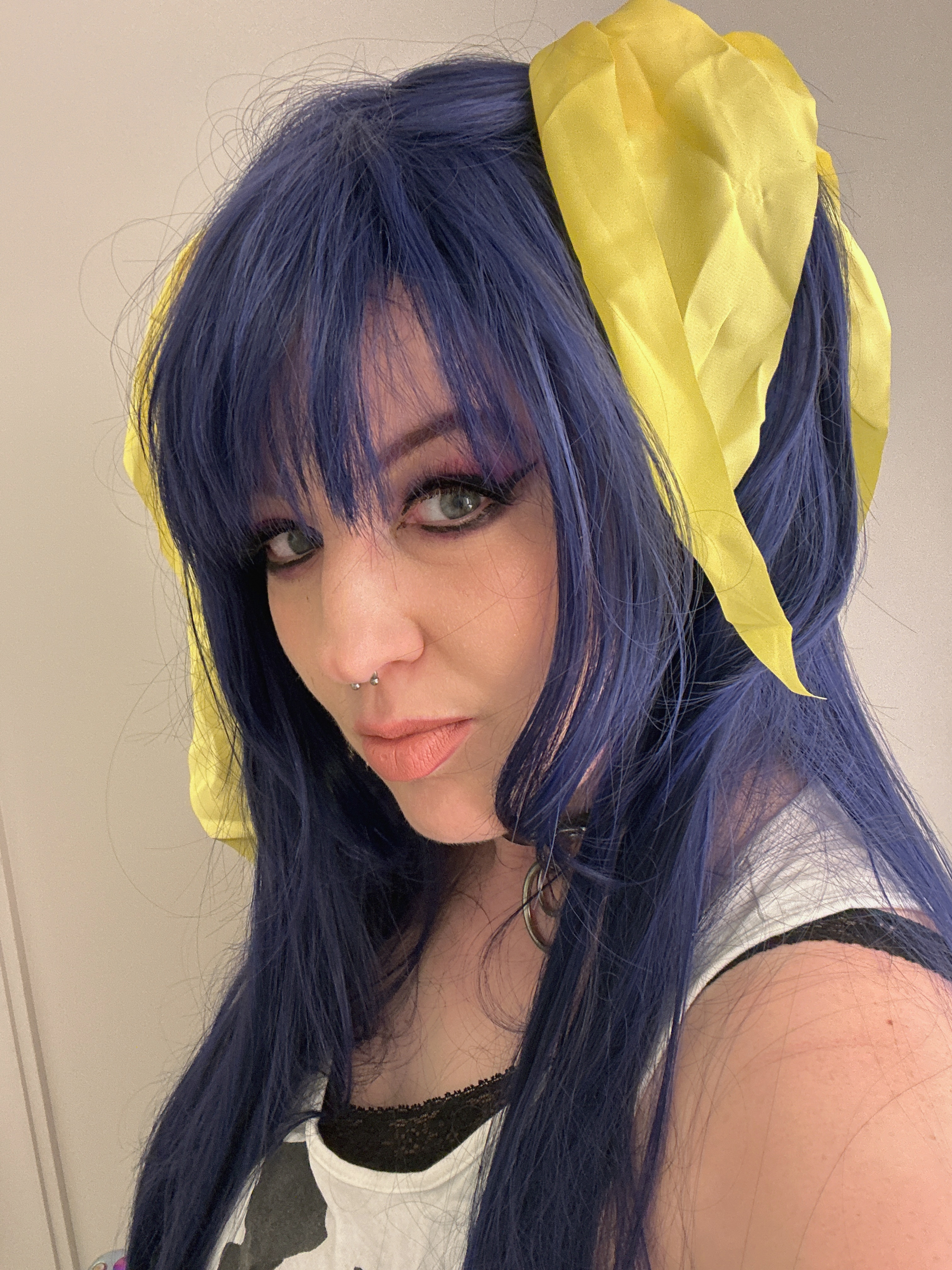
- Buckland in 2025
- Born: July 16, 1987 (age 39); Anchorage, Alaska, U.S.
- Education: University of Alaska Anchorage (BA)
- Occupation: Voice actress
- Years active: 2004–present
- Kira Buckland's voice Buckland's voice acting in the game Motorslice
- Website: www.kirabuckland.com

Kira Buckland (born July 16, 1987) is an American voice actress who has provided voices for English dubbed Japanese anime, cartoons, and video games. Some of her (Note: Buckland uses "she/her" and "they/them" pronouns. This article uses "she/her" pronouns for consistency.) major roles are Jolyne Cujoh and Reimi Sugimoto in JoJo's Bizarre Adventure, Mitsuri Kanroji in Demon Slayer: Kimetsu no Yaiba, 2B in Nier: Automata, Hiyoko Saionji and Kirumi Tojo in the Danganronpa series, Trucy Wright in the Ace Attorney series, Ari in the Class of '09 series, Qingyi in Zenless Zone Zero, Celine and Elise Schwarzer in The Legend of Heroes: Trails of Cold Steel series, Akane Toriyasu and Inkyu Basu in Yandere Simulator, Talim in Soulcalibur VI (including 2B as its guest character), Beatrice in Re:Zero, Izumo Kamiki in Blue Exorcist, Heart Aino from Arcana Heart series in BlazBlue: Cross Tag Battle, Falke in Street Fighter V, Edna in Tales of Zestiria, Mary Saotome in Kakegurui, Yung in Godzilla Singular Point, Ayumi Otosaka in Charlotte, Julis-Alexia von Riessfeld in The Asterisk War, Kuki Shinobu in Genshin Impact, and Marie in Skullgirls.

== Early life ==
Buckland was born on July 16, 1987, in Anchorage, Alaska.

== Career ==
Buckland started voice acting in 2004 where she worked on numerous projects such as radio dramas and computer/video games. She rose to prominence online for voicing characters in Newgrounds Flash animations and series on YouTube under her Internet pseudonym "Rina-chan". She participated in parodies, collaborations and original works.

While a student at West High School, she became president of the anime club and with the president of the anime club from Dimond High founded the first Alaskan anime convention , Senshi-Con, based in Anchorage, Alaska. She won the Anime Expo 2007 Idol Voice Acting competition, as well as the Sakura-Con 2007 animated voice acting award. She is primarily known for her voice work on video games and English anime dubs.

== Personal life ==
Buckland graduated with a degree in Japanese and is proficient in Spanish. She moved to Southern California in 2011 and worked miscellaneous jobs while training to be a professional voice actor, such as a feline neonatal caregiver.

Before her professional career, Buckland was familiar with the manga series JoJo's Bizarre Adventure and got a tattoo of a star on the back of her neck which resembles the Joestar Birthmark. During her career she expressed a desire to voice of the character Jolyne Cujoh in an official project. She would eventually voice the character in the anime adaptation of JoJo's Bizarre Adventure: Stone Ocean.

== Filmography ==
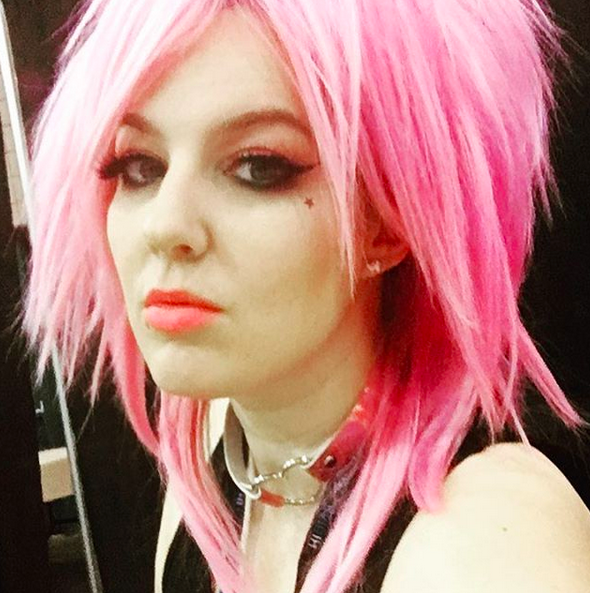
Buckland at SacAnime 2018

=== Animation ===
Year	Title	Role	Notes	Source
2014	Lalaloopsy Girls: Welcome to L.A.L.A. Prep School	Jewel Sparkles		Resume
2015–present	Miraculous: Tales of Ladybug & Cat Noir	Alix Kubdel / Bunnyx	Grouped under Additional Voices	
2018	Wakfu	Evangelyne	Season 3 only	Resume
2019–20	YooHoo to the Rescue	YooHoo		Resume
2019–22	The VeggieTales Show	Petunia Rhubarb, Laura Carrot		
2020–present	Rainbow High	Violet Willow		

=== Anime ===
Year	Title	Role	Notes	Source
2008	Aika R-16: Virgin Mission	Eri Shinkai		
2008–09	Tweeny Witches: The Adventures	Hanamomo		Resume
2008–09	Moribito: Guardian of the Spirit	Nimka		Resume
2012–present	Blue Exorcist	Izumo Kamiki	Also Blue Exorcist: The Movie	Resume
2013	Nura: Rise of the Yokai Clan	Daughter of Kyokutsu		Resume
2013	Accel World	Kuroyukihime/Black Lotus		Resume
2013–14	Lagrange: The Flower of Rin-ne	Madoka Kyono		Resume
2014	Magi: The Labyrinth of Magic	Ren Kogyoku	Also Kingdom	Resume
2014	Blood Lad	Hydra Bell		
2014	Kill la Kill	Maimu Okurahama, Imagawa		Resume
2015–16	Durarara!!×2	Mika Harima		Resume
2016	Aldnoah.Zero	Lemrina Vers Envers		
2016	Love Live!	Umi Sonoda		
2016	Danganronpa 3: The End of Hope's Peak High School	Hiyoko Saionji		
2016	Tales of Zestiria the X	Edna		
2016	Charlotte	Ayumi Otosaka		
2016	Mobile Suit Gundam: Iron-Blooded Orphans	Cookie Griffon, Eco Turbine		Resume
2016	Fight Ippatsu! Jūden-chan!!	Arresta Blanket		
2016	Pokémon Generations	Malva, Little Girl		Resume
2016–17	The Asterisk War	Julis-Alexia von Riessfeld		
2016–17	Sailor Moon	Mimete	Viz dub	
2016–17	Hunter × Hunter	Zushi	2011 series	
2016–17	Kuromukuro	Muetta, Yukihime		
2017	Rio: Rainbow Gate!	Jack Mighty		Resume
2017	World War Blue	Kurvay		Resume
2017	Skip Beat!	Ruriko Matsunai	Eps. 5-7	Resume
2017–18	The Testament of Sister New Devil	Maria Naruse	Also season 2	Resume
2018	Granblue Fantasy The Animation	Lyria		
2018	Hi Score Girl	Mayumayu	Netflix dub	
2018	Kakegurui	Mary Saotome	Netflix dub	Tweet
2018	Violet Evergarden	Luculia	Netflix dub	Resume
2018	Yo-kai Watch	Jibanyan	Season 3	
2018–present	Re:Zero − Starting Life in Another World	Beatrice, Hetaro Pearlbaton, Lucas		Resume
2019	JoJo's Bizarre Adventure: Diamond is Unbreakable	Reimi Sugimoto		
2019	KonoSuba: God's Blessing on this Wonderful World!	Chris		
2019	The Rising of the Shield Hero	Rishia Ivyred, Shadow, Makina		
2019	Cells at Work!	Senpai Red Blood Cell		
2019	High School Prodigies Have It Easy Even In Another World	Shinobu Sarutobi, Jeanne du Leblanc		
2019–present	Welcome to Demon School! Iruma-kun	Ameri Azazel		
2019–present	Isekai Quartet	Beatrice, Chris		
2020	Magia Record	Iroha Tamaki		
2020	Demon Slayer: Kimetsu no Yaiba	Mitsuri Kanroji, Lower Four, Mukago		
2020	Tower of God	Yuri Jahad		
2020	My Next Life as a Villainess: All Routes Lead to Doom!	Sophia Ascart	Crunchyroll dub	
2020–22	Yashahime: Princess Half-Demon	Setsuna		
2021	The Hidden Dungeon Only I Can Enter	Luna Heela		
2021	Sleepy Princess in the Demon Castle	Princess Syalis	Funimation dub	
2021	So I'm a Spider, So What?	Katia, Sue		
2021	Godzilla Singular Point	Jung, Yung (Jet Jaguar)	Netflix dub	
2021	Edens Zero	Rebecca Bluegarden	Netflix dub	
2021	To Your Eternity	Hayase; 8 episodes		
2021	Dropout Idol Fruit Tart	Ino Sakura		
2021	King's Raid: Successors of the Will	Frey		
2021	One Piece	Desire		
2021–22	JoJo's Bizarre Adventure: Stone Ocean	Jolyne Cujoh	Netflix dub	
2022	LBX Girls	Kyoka		
2022	Komi Can't Communicate	Makeru Yadano	Netflix dub	
2022	Kakegurui Twin	Mary Saotome	Netflix dub	
2023–24	Nier: Automata Ver1.1a	2B		
2024	Sand Land	Ann		
2024	Code Geass: Rozé of the Recapture	Haruka Rutaka		
2024	Tower of God 2nd Season	Yuri Jahad		
2025	Sakamoto Days	Host		
2025	Blue Box	Niina Shimazaki, Chinatsu's mother		
2026	Grow Up Show: Sunflower Circus	Rin Mamiya		
2026	Hands Off: Sawaranaide Kotesashi-kun	Chiyo Sayamagaoka		

=== Film ===
Year	Title	Role	Notes	Source
2011	5 Centimeters Per Second	Kanae Sumida	Bandai (Bang Zoom!) English dub	Resume
2013	Blue Exorcist: The Movie	Izumo Kamiki	Limited theatrical release	
2016	Love Live! The School Idol Movie	Umi Sonoda		
2016	Schirkoa	Little Whore		
2017	Fate/Grand Order: First Order	Olga Marie Animusphere		Resume
2017	In This Corner of the World	Keiko		Resume
2017	Blame!	Sanakan		Resume
2018	A Silent Voice	Naoka Ueno	English dub	
2019	I Want to Eat Your Pancreas	Kyoko	Limited theatrical release	
2020	Burn the Witch	Sullivan Squire		
2023	Ladybug & Cat Noir: The Movie	Alix Kubdel	English dub; Netflix	

=== Video games ===
Year	Title	Role	Notes	Source
2005	The White Chamber	Sarah	Credited in-game as "Kagome".	
2005	Kramer Hentai Adventure 2	Fuyutsuki, Itsuko, Urumi		
2005	MapleStory	Orchid, Lotus, Roo-D		Resume
2006	-TRAPPED-	Dialla Reineheart		In-game credits
2006	Super Smash Flash	Announcer, Naruto Uzumaki		
2006	-PURSUIT-	Dialla Reineheart		In-game credits
2006	Kramer Hentai Adventure 3	Fuyutsuki, Itsuko, Kinpatssu, Kitty Cat, Urumi		
2007	Kramer Hentai Adventure 4	Kiki		
2007	-ESCAPE-	Dialla Reineheart		In-game credits
2008	Castle Crashers	Princesses, Medusa		Resume
2008	Eternal Poison	Marie		
2008	Luminous Arc 2	Karen, Elicia		
2009	Dynasty Warriors 6: Empires	Custom Female: Innocent		
2010	Heroes of Newerth	Monster Hunter Calamity		Resume
2011−16	Phoenix Wright: Ace Attorney − Conflict of Interest	Trucy Wright	Fan game	Game page
2012	Dynasty Warriors Next	Custom Female: Delicate		
2012	Skullgirls	Marie		
2012	Dust: An Elysian Tail	MaMop		
2012	Mugen Souls	Chou-Chou	Also Mugen Souls Z	
2012	Ragnarok Odyssey	Linde		Resume
2013	Jisei series	Chance Jackson		Resume
2013	Atelier Ayesha: The Alchemist of Dusk	Nio Atluge, Odelia	Also Atelier Ayesha Plus	
2013	Time and Eternity	Toki		
2014	Bravely Default	Artemia Venus, Fake Airy		
2014	Inazuma Eleven	Silvia Woods		Resume
2014	Atelier Escha & Logy: Alchemists of the Dusk Sky	Nio Altugle	Also Atelier Escha & Logy Plus	
2014	My Little Pony: Power Ponies Storybook App	Twilight Sparkle, Spike		
2014	Tales of Xillia 2	Mary, Mint, Additional Voices		
2014	Danganronpa 2: Goodbye Despair	Hiyoko Saionji		Resume
2014	Fairy Fencer F	Ethel, Della, Khalara, Shopkeeper	Also Advent Dark Force	
2014	Ar Nosurge	Nay	Also Ar Nosurge Plus	
2014	My Little Pony: Luna Eclipsed Storybook App	Twilight Sparkle, Spike, Applejack, Pinkie Pie		
2014	My Little Pony: Twilight's Kingdom Storybook App	Twilight Sparkle, Applejack		
2014−present	Yandere Simulator	Akane Toriyasu, Inkyu Basu		
2015	HuniePop	Lola Rembrite		Resume
2015	Dead or Alive 5: Last Round	Honoka		Resume
2015	Blackhole	Auriel		Resume
2015	The Awakened Fate Ultimatum	Phyllis Izayoi		
2015	Shin Megami Tensei: Devil Survivor 2 - Record Breaker	Miyako Hotsuin		
2015	Lost Dimension	Mana Kawai		
2015	Disgaea 5: Alliance of Vengeance	Seraphina		
2015	Tales of Zestiria	Edna		Resume
2015	Stella Glow	Dorothy		
2015	Xenoblade Chronicles X	Female Avatar (Independent voice)		
2015	The Legend of Heroes: Trails of Cold Steel	Celine, Elise Schwarzer		
2016	Street Fighter V	Resume	Falke	Character first seen in Season 3 Character Pass
2016	Megatagmension Blanc + Neptune vs. Zombies	Resume	Hachima	
2016	The Legend of Heroes: Trails of Cold Steel II	Celine, Elise Schwarzer		
2016	Grand Kingdom	Lillia Sforza		Resume
2016	Phoenix Wright: Ace Attorney − Spirit of Justice	Trucy Wright		Tweet
2016	Paladins	Evie, Willo		Resume
2016	The Legend of Zelda: Ancient Stone Tablets	Princess Zelda	Fan Translation Fan Dub	Game Credits
2017	Fire Emblem Heroes	Eirika, Katarina	Family Bonds story	
2017	Nier: Automata	YoRHa No.2 Type B (2B)		
2017	Akiba's Beat	Acquire-chan		Tweet
2017	Regalia: Of Men and Monarchs	Miri		
2017	Summon Night 6: Lost Borders	Milreaf, Partet, Resi		
2017	Puyo Puyo Tetris	Rulue		Tweet
2017	Ys VIII: Lacrimosa of Dana	Laxia		
2017	Danganronpa V3: Killing Harmony	Kirumi Tojo, Hiyoko Saionji		Resume
2018	Detective Pikachu	Emilia Christie		
2018	Shining Resonance Refrain	Rinna Mayfield		Resume
2018	Octopath Traveler	Cordelia, Mary, Derryl		Resume
2018	Valkyria Chronicles IV	Angelica "Annie" Farnaby		
2018	Soulcalibur VI	Talim, 2B		Resume
2018	Grand Chase: Dimension Chaser	Lire Eruel, Amy Plie		Tweet, Facebook
2019	Death end re;Quest	Lily Hopes		Tweet
2019	Dead or Alive 6	Honoka		Tweet
2019	Zanki Zero	Sachika Hirasawa		
2019	BlazBlue: Cross Tag Battle	Heart Aino	From Arcana Heart; Season 2 DLC	Tweet
2019	Puyo Puyo Champions	Ally, Rulue		Tweet
2019	River City Girls	Kyoko		In-game credits
2019	Pokémon Masters	Shauntal, Liza, Beauty, Rising Star		Resume and Tweet
2019	Code Vein	Rin Murasame, player avatar		Resume
2019	The TakeOver	Freya		
2020	One-Punch Man: A Hero Nobody Knows	Additional voices		
2020	Wallachia: Reign of Dracula	Elcin Floarea		Game page
2020	Granblue Fantasy Versus	Lyria		
2020	KartRider Rush+	Marid, Uni		
2020	Heart of the Woods	Morgan		Game page
2020	Death end re;Quest 2	Lily Hopes		Tweet
2020	Phantasy Star Online 2	Risa		
2020	Hotshot Racing	Alexa		
2020	13 Sentinels: Aegis Rim	Ryoko Shinonome		Tweet
2020	The Legend of Heroes: Trails of Cold Steel IV	Celine, Elise Schwarzer		
2021	Re:Zero − Starting Life in Another World: The Prophecy of the Throne	Beatrice, Hetaro Pearlbaton		In-game credits
2021	Persona 5 Strikers	Kuon Ichinose		
2021	Nier Replicant ver.1.22474487139...	Administrator Girl (Ending E)		
2021	Shadowverse: Champion's Battle	Vanessa Joubert		
2021	Class of '09	Ari		
2021	Cris Tales	Crisbell		
2021	Demon Slayer: Kimetsu no Yaiba – The Hinokami Chronicles	Mitsuri Kanroji		
2021	Muv-Luv: Project Mikhail	Meiya Mitsurugi		
2022	Gunvolt Chronicles: Luminous Avenger iX 2	Kohaku		
2022	Phantom Breaker: Omnia	Mei Orisaka		
2022	Genshin Impact	Kuki Shinobu		Tweet
2022	Tower of Fantasy	Meryl, Hilda, Hanna, Female Wanderer		
2022	Soul Hackers 2	Ash		
2022	Goddess of Victory: Nikke	Privaty, Novel, 2B	Credited in-game	
2022	River City Girls 2	Kyoko, Kyoko's Mom		
2023	Fire Emblem Engage	Eirika		
2023	Path of the Midnight Sun	Caepana		
2023	The Legend of Heroes: Trails into Reverie	Celine, Elise Schwarzer, Soldiers & Citizens of Zemuria		
2023	Rhapsody II: Ballad of the Little Princess	Cornet		
2023	Rhapsody III: Memories of Marl Kingdom	Cornet		
2023	Eternights	Sia		
2023	Disgaea 7: Vows of the Virtueless	Seraphina		
2023	Detective Pikachu Returns	Emilia Christie		
2023	Skullgirls	Marie	Credited in-game	
2023	Project Wingman: Frontline 59	General Faust	Credited in-game	In-game credits
2023	Afterimage	Renee		
2023	Class of '09: The Re-up	Ari	Credited in-game	
2024	Granblue Fantasy Versus: Rising	Lyria, YoRHa No.2 Type B (2B)	From Nier: Automata; DLC	
2024	Tekken 8	Jane		
2024	Granblue Fantasy: Relink	Lyria		
2024	Unicorn Overlord	Eltolinde		
2024	Contra: Operation Galuga	Lucia Drake		
2024	Puyo Puyo Puzzle Pop	Ally, Rafisol, Rulue		
2024	Sand Land	Ann		
2024	Zenless Zone Zero	Qingyi		
2024	Kitsune Tails	Yuzu		In-game credits
2024	Fate Trigger: The Novita	Eos		Announcement Trailer
2024	Guilty Gear Strive	Dizzy		Twitter post
2024	Card-en-Ciel	Zipangu ♀, Moka Zenyoji, Kohaku, Mother Computer		
2024	Romancing SaGa 2: Revenge of the Seven	Therese/Ranger (F)		
2024	Farmagia	Nares, Arvielle, additional voices		
2024	Strinova	Eika		
2024	Class of '09: The Flip Side	Ari	Credited in-game	
2025	Xenoblade Chronicles X: Definitive Edition	Female Avatar (Independent voice), additional voices		
2025	Yakuza 0 Director's Cut	Additional voices		
2026	Motorslice	Slicer P		
2026	Danganronpa 2×2	Hiyoko Saionji		
2026	Ace Combat 8: Wings of Theve	Voice warning system		
2026	Coffee Buns	Ash		

=== Web series ===
Year	Title	Role	Notes	Source
2005	Eddsworld	Kim, Katya	Episode: "Dudette Next Door"	
2006	Sonic: Nazo Unleashed	Female Newscaster	Part 1	Credits
2006–08	Metal Gear Awesome	Meryl Silverburgh	2 episodes	
2008	Brawl Taunts	Zero-Suit Samus, Princess Peach, Princess Zelda, Samus		Tweet
2008	More Brawl Taunts	Zero-Suit Samus, Pokémon Trainer, Princess Peach, Princess Zelda, Herself	Also writer; voice director and sound engineer	
2009	One More Brawl Taunts	Princess Peach, Princess Zelda, Sheik, Samus, Pokémon Trainer, Herself	Also creator; sound engineer, writer	
2011–13	PONY.MOV	Twilight Sparkle	6 episodes	Interview
2013	My Little Pony - Double Rainboom	Twilight Sparkle		YouTube
2013–17	50% OFF	Gou Matsuoka		YouTube
2013–18	Hellsing Ultimate Abridged	Heinkel Wolfe	6 episodes	
2015–25	Death Battle	Toph Beifong, Raven, Twilight Sparkle, Cortana	4 episodes	
2015–20	Final Fantasy VII: Machinabridged	Aerith Gainsborough	A TeamFourStar abridged series	
2018	Khonjin House	Wikipe-tan	2 episodes, character referred to as "Anime Advertising Hack" in credits	Credits
2020	ERIC	Mrs. Ericsson	1 episode	
2022	A Moment of Euphoria	Euphoria	Channel Special	
2024	Class of '09: The Anime	Ari	Second Pilot	
2026	Mau Makan Apa?	Erika Utomo	English dub; Episode 3: You Once Left Me With This	

== Awards ==
Year	Award	Category	Result	Source
2007	AX 2007 Idol Winner	Best Voice Acting Performance	Won	
2007	Sakura-Con 2007 Idol Winner	Best Voice Acting Performance	Won	
