= Alaska Psychiatric Institute =

Geography
- Location: Anchorage, Alaska, United States
- Coordinates: 61.185511°N 149.828968°W

Organization
- Type: Specialist

Services
- Beds: 72
- Speciality: Psychiatric hospital

History
- Opened: 1962

Links
- Lists: Hospitals in Alaska

The Alaska Psychiatric Institute is a psychiatric hospital in Anchorage, Alaska that provides inpatient and outpatient mental health services for the state.

== Operation ==
The institute has a normal capacity of 72 beds with a stretch capacity of 80. There have been concerns that this is not enough to meet demand.

The beds are organized into three units: medium to long term, adolescent, and secure forensic.

The Joint Commission recognized the institute in 2012 for being in the top third of its national performance rankings for psychiatric hospitals.

== History ==
The Institute opened in 1962. It was commissioned in 1956 as part of the Alaska Mental Health Enabling Act which allotted 6.5 million dollars for its construction.

In 1992 the institute employed 282 staff.

=== Incidents ===
In 1982, while on limited release from the institute, Charles L. Meach, who had previously beaten a man to death and been found not guilty by reason of insanity in 1973, committed four murders.

In 1985 the director of the institute was taken hostage at gunpoint by a patient. The situation was resolved the following day without injuries.

=== Myers v. Alaska Psychiatric Institute ===
In 2003 Faith Myers was involuntarily committed to the institute by her family for refusing medication. The institute petitioned the Anchorage Superior Court and was authorized to compel her to take antipsychotics. Meyers challenged the ruling based on Alaska's constitutional guarantees of liberty and privacy. In 2006 the Alaska Supreme Court ruled in her favor and placed greater restrictions on non-emergency involuntary psychotropic medication in the state.
