= Motorslice =

2026 video game

- A trailer for Motorslice
- Developer: Regular Studio
- Publisher: Top Hat Studios
- Composer: Pizza Hotline
- Engine: Unreal Engine 5
- Platforms: PlayStation 5; Windows; Xbox Series X/S
- Release: May 5, 2026
- Genres: Platformer, hack and slash
- Mode: Single-player

Motorslice, stylized in all caps, is a platformer and hack and slash video game developed by Brazilian indie game studio Regular Studio and published by Top Hat Studios. It was released for PlayStation 5, Windows, and Xbox Series X/S on May 5, 2026.

== Gameplay ==
The gameplay of Motorslice takes inspiration from games such as Mirror's Edge and Shadow of the Colossus. The player controls a chainsaw-wielding young woman named Slicer P as well as a floating orb-shaped robot named Orbie, who serves as the game's camera.

The game comprises eight chapters in which Slicer P traverses a vast, brutalist megastructure with the goal of destroying all of the machines inside, including massive hostile construction vehicles, trucks, and industrial scrappers. She traverses the structure through parkour, including wall-running and vaulting. Slicer P also has the ability to "motorslice", or ride across golden electrified walls by driving her chainsaw through them. Throughout the game are "slack off" areas in which Slicer P can relax and converse with Orbie. The player can choose Orbie's dialogue options, which may either tell Slicer P to get back to work or express sexual attraction towards her.

== Development ==
A video showcasing the game's interactive title screen posted to the Regular Studio YouTube channel

Motorslice was developed by Regular Studio, a Brazilian indie game studio led by brothers Luqui and Saiki. The development of Motorslice was documented on the Regular Studio YouTube channel. On March 7, 2025, Regular Studio uploaded a video titled "She likes to touch things", showcasing in-development gameplay focusing on the protagonist Slicer P. This video gained 511,000 views by April 2026, gaining the game a following. A video titled "I made a *very* touchable main menu" showcased the game's interactive title screen and gained 3.5 million views. Slicer P is voiced by Kira Buckland.

== Reception ==
Reception

Aggregate scores
Aggregator	Score
Metacritic	(PC) 73/100 (PS5) 79/100
OpenCritic	63% recommend (Note: Based on 16 reviews)

According to the review aggregation website Metacritic, the PlayStation 5 version of Motorslice received generally favorable reviews from critics, while the PC version received "mixed or average" reviews from critics. Fellow review aggregator OpenCritic assessed that the game received strong approval, being recommended by 63% of critics.

Creative Bloq rated the game 8 out of 10, praising it for its tone, visuals, and environmental design, although it criticized the "motorslice" mechanic as occasionally difficult to control. Forbes also criticized some platforming mechanics as inconsistent, but ultimately praised the game, saying it was "easy to like and even more difficult to put down". CGMagazine gave the game a score of 7.5, saying that the world design was "breathtaking" and that while the game had a "decent parkour experience", its "unique colossal world" made it worthwhile.

Forbes and CGMagazine both critiqued the game for its lack of story. Forbes said that "those looking for a deep storyline won't really get one", while CGMagazine wrote that the game "holds back just a little too much" of its story. PC Gamer criticized Orbie's dialogue options as "pervy", saying that Orbie saying things such as "you're such a good girl" were distracting.
