= Lidia Selkregg =

Italian-born geologist who worked in Alaska (1920–1999)

Lidia Lippi Selkregg
- Born: Lidia Lippi; 1920; Florence, Italy
- Died: August 14, 1999 (aged 78–79); Anchorage, Alaska, U.S.
- Education: University of Illinois Urbana–Champaign (PhD)
- Occupations: Geologist and professor of regional planning
- Spouse: Fred Selkregg
- Children: 3

Lidia Lippi Selkregg (1920 – August 14, 1999) was an Italian geologist and professor of regional planning at the University of Alaska Anchorage. In the days following the 1964 Alaska earthquake, Selkregg helped organize a group of local geologists to gather important data about earthquake damage to inform future recommendations about building stability. She also helped promote earthquake safety, land preservation, and economic development in the Anchorage area.

== Early life and education ==
Selkregg was born Lidia Lippi in Florence, Italy in 1920. Her father died when she was three years old, and she lived in Italy and North Africa with her mother and two brothers. During World War II, Lippi and her mother lived in Florence, Italy, where she worked as a nurse. She also joined the Italian resistance against the Nazis.

Lidia Selkregg trained as a geologist. She received her doctorate degree from the University of Illinois Urbana–Champaign.

== Career ==
Selkregg moved to Alaska in 1958, where she worked as a planner in Anchorage. She wrote the Economic Development Administration Grant for the Port of Anchorage, and she fought to protect land for the Anchorage watershed.

In the aftermath of the 1964 Alaska earthquake, the most powerful recorded earthquake in U.S. history, a small group of professional geologists, led by Selkregg, then a geologist with the Alaska State Housing Authority, were authorized by the housing authority and city officials to outline immediate courses of action. The Engineering Geology Evaluation Group was formed, consisting of a volunteer team of local geologists, engineering geologists, and soil scientists. Starting just two days after the earthquake, the group mapped the entire earthquake area and obtained aerial photographs of the damage. They also measured all of the vertical and horizontal displacements in the area. They released a preliminary report on April 14, 1964, and a final report on May 8, 1964. This report was later used by the Scientific and Engineering Task Force, appointed by the Federal Reconstruction and Development Planning Commission for Alaska, to make recommendations about stability in the wake of the earthquake.

Selkregg also worked to get the population of Valdez to move away from the previous site of their town. In the years after the earthquake, she worked to raise awareness among the public about earthquake risk.

From 1971 to 1985, Selkregg was a professor of resources and socioeconomic planning and regional planning at the University of Alaska Anchorage, where she developed a graduate planning program. She was the editor of the "Environmental Atlas of the Greater Anchorage Area Borough," published by the University of Alaska in 1972.

Selkregg served on the Advisory Committee to the Carter White House Conference on Balanced National Growth and Economic Development; she also served in the Anchorage Assembly. As a member of the Assembly, she helped create the city's network of trails and parks.

The Dr. Lidia Selkregg Chalet at Russian Jack Springs Park is named for Selkregg.

== Personal life ==
Lippi married Fred Selkregg in 1945. They had three children. Selkregg died on August 14, 1999. She was inducted into the Alaska Women's Hall of Fame in 2009.
