= Schirkoa =

- Film poster
- Directed by: Ishan Shukla
- Written by: Ishan Shukla
- Produced by: Sharad Varma
- Starring: Kira Buckland
- Music by: Nicolas Titeux
- Release date: 8 September 2016
- Running time: 14 minutes
- Country: India
- Language: English

Schirkoa (/ˈʃɜːrkoʊɑː/) is an Indian 14-minute animated short film written, directed, and animated by Ishan Shukla. On its premiere, the short film qualified for The Academy Award after winning the 'Best Animated Short' award at LA Shorts Fest. It's the first Indian animated short to ever qualify for the Oscars. It also won the 'Best in Show' award at SIGGRAPH Asia.

== Premise ==
In the city of Bag-heads, a politician is torn between his career, brothels and his love for a shadowy woman.

== Production ==
First conceived as a graphic novel in 2012, Shukla worked on it on and off along with a day job for four years. The short was created using Autodesk Maya, Adobe Creative Cloud and Redshift. Schirkoa was funded through personal savings. Shukla's wife Sharad Varma served as the producer of the film. Although the film is made in 3D, it has a stylized 2D look that's been achieved through a number of techniques.

== Accolades ==
Schirkoa has been screened in over 50 film festivals all over the world. It will continue its festival run till mid 2018.

List of Awards and Nominations
Year	Award	Category	Result
2017	American Movie Awards	Best Animated Short	Won
2017	ARFF International	Best of the Best	Nominated
2017	Athens Animfest	Special Mention	Won
2016	Tapiales International Film Festival	Best Animated Short	Won
2016	SIGGRAPH Asia	Best in Show	Won
2016	The Great Indian Film and Literature Festival	Best Animated Short	Won
2016	Oaxaca Film Festival	Best Animated Short	Won
2016	Venice Film Week	Best Animated Short	Won
2016	LA Shorts Fest	Best Animated Short	Won

== Reception ==
Schirkoa has been listed in the Zippy Frames Annual list of Top animated shorts of the 2016. Jeroen Van Rossem of Kortfilm calls it "frequently reminiscent of Blade Runner, Brazil, Children of Men and 1984. Cult Critic Magazine praises the mature theme of the animated film, calling it "a prototype for a much longer feature or series".
