= Russian Jack Springs Park =

Park in Anchorage, Alaska, United States of America

Coordinates: 61°12′25″N 149°47′14″W

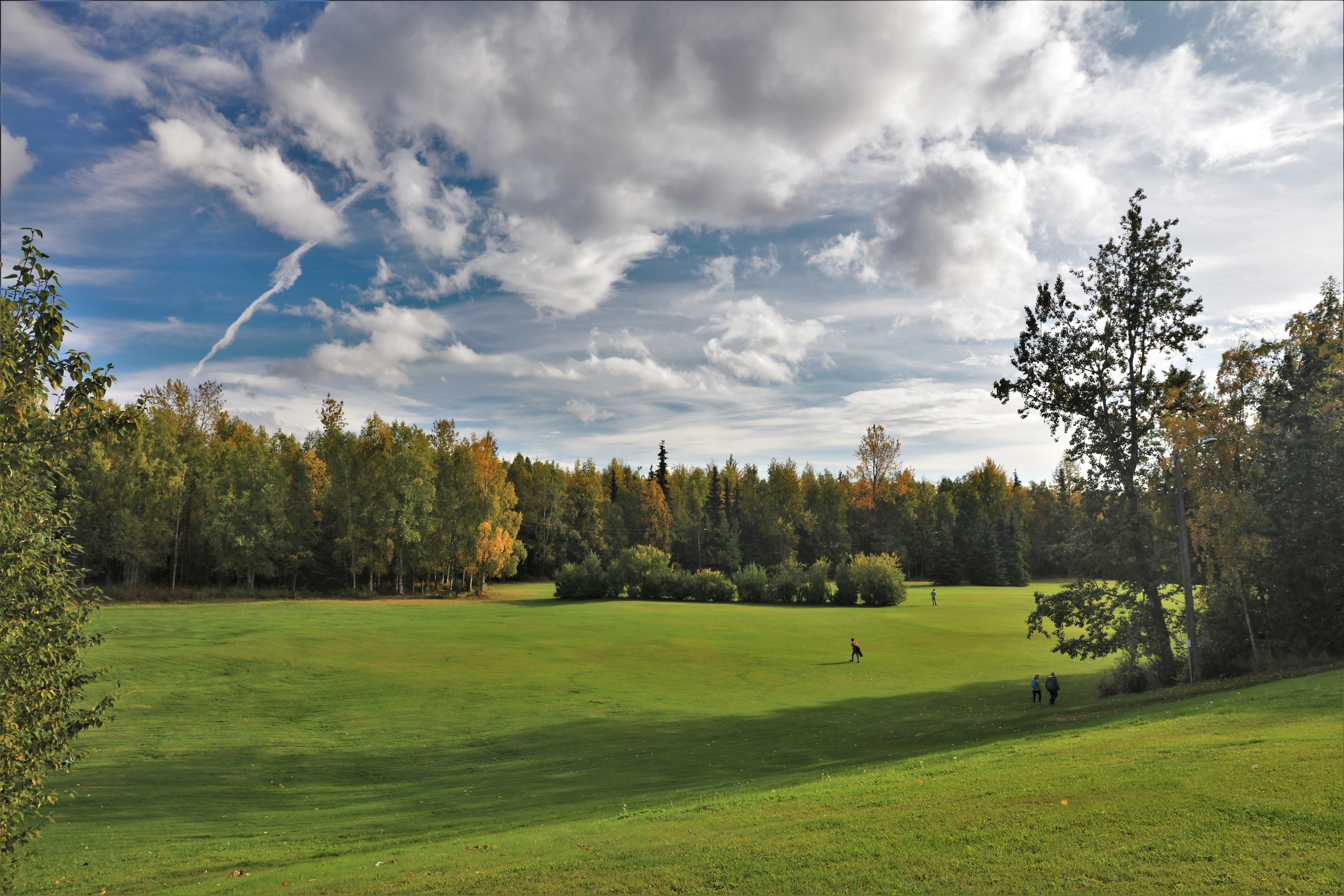
- Southern half of the park, 2017
- Interactive map of Russian Jack Springs Park
- Type: Public
- Location: Russian Jack, Anchorage
- Area: approx. 300 acres

Russian Jack Springs Park is a public park located in Anchorage, Alaska, managed by the Municipality of Anchorage. The park is named for Jacob "Russian Jack" Marunenko. The park comprises two quarter-sections, minus road rights-of-way, covering approximately 300 acres (120 ha). DeBarr Road, a major east–west arterial road in Anchorage, bisects the park.

It was the site of four murders by Charles L. Meach in 1982.

== History ==
Before the settlement and incorporation of Anchorage, the land that would make up the park, like the rest of the Russian Jack area, had been used for hunting by the K’enakatnu people. During the early 1900s, Peter Toloff and Nicholas Darlopaulos each filed for and received permission to homestead on 160 acres of land in the area. Toloff gave permission to a friend of his, Ukrainian immigrant Jacob Marunenko, known to locals as Russian Jack, permission to live on his land. Maruneko built a cabin in the south half of the park sometime during the 1920s and received a permit to harvest lumber. To earn a living, he sold moonshine to Anchorage residents from the land until the end of Prohibition in 1933. Ten years later, as a result of the World War II-related expansion of Fort Richardson, the U.S. Army took the homesteads from Toloff and Darlopaulos, giving them either US$4,300 US$4,800 in return.

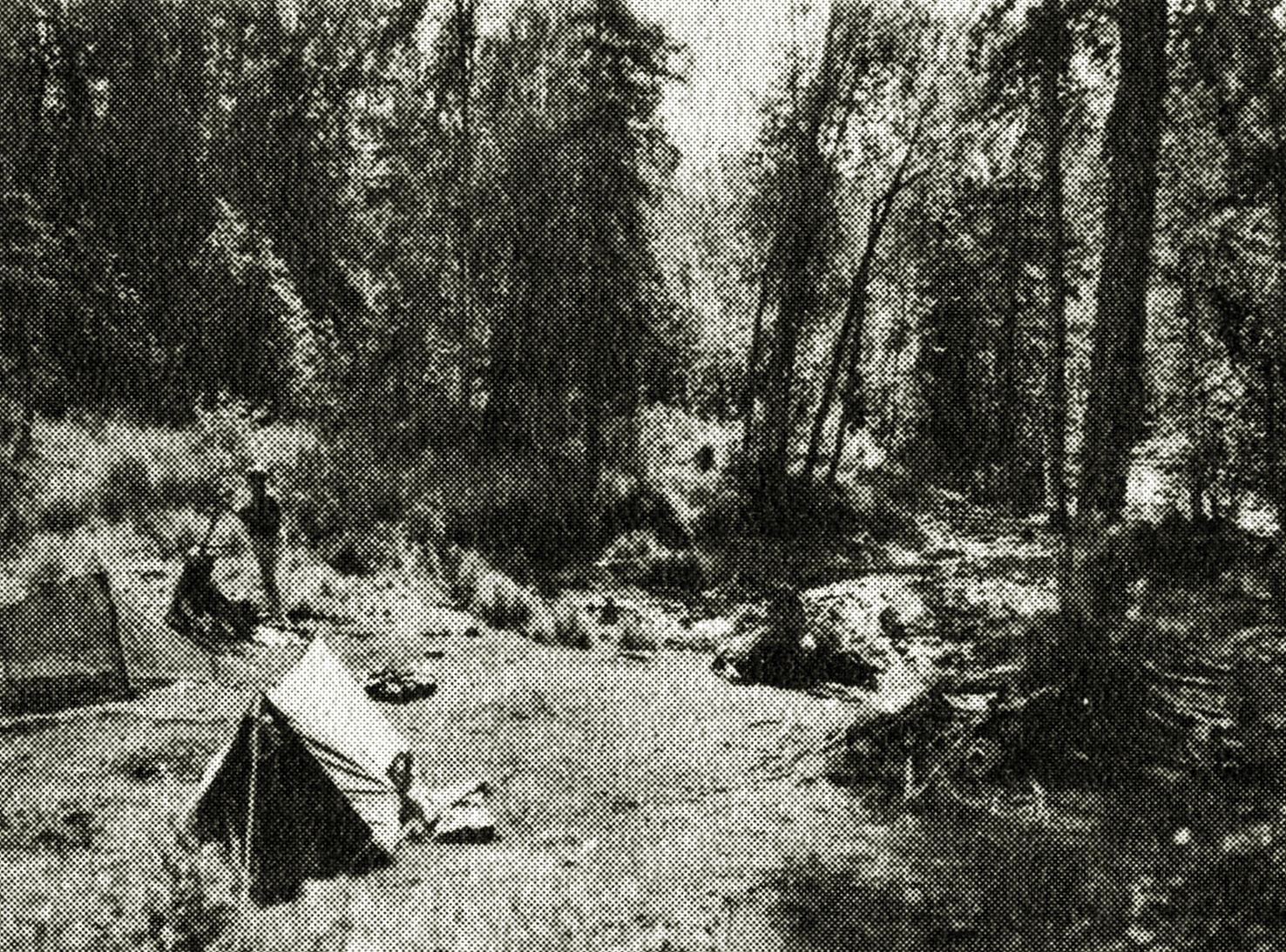
View of the fledgling park in 1959. Due to the prison farm which operated on the same tract of land, recreational uses were limited at the time to day camping (shown here) and picnicking.

The land was sold by the War Assets Administration to the City of Anchorage in 1948 for US$16,000 (equivalent to $155,061 in 2024). The City was interested in both the land itself and the freshwater springs on it, which they hoped might function as a water source. In 1951, they created a minimum security prison farm on 26 acres of the site. With three Quonset huts, the farm initially housed forty prisoners convicted of mostly alcohol-related misdemeanors. Sentences were often between 30 and 90 days, and those at the farm would have to work around town, cut firewood, and grow food. The farm lacked fences and was mostly self-sufficient. It was moved to Point Campbell in 1968 and closed soon after; the land at Russian Jack was turned into a golf course the following year. Operating concurrently with the prison farm was the Girl Scout's Winding Trails Day Camp, established in 1952.

In 1966, as part of Alaska Centenniel celebrations, there was a movement to use a portion of the park for a zoo. Proponents of the Russian Jack Springs Zoo, as it would have been called, included Sammye Taplin and John Mlakar, and opponents included cross-country skiers and golfers. The city had previously agreed to donate land should funding be acquired, but a proposal to use US$500,000 of federal money to build the zoo failed to pass in a referendum put to the Anchorage voters, and what what would become the Alaska Zoo was built on a different site.

A golf course was opened by the city in autumn 1969. It proved popular with golfers, as the town's Forest Park golf course had been closed two years previously.

It was the site of four murders by Charles L. Meach in 1982.

== Facilities ==
=== Dr. Lidia Selkregg Chalet ===
In 1967, an octagonal chalet was built near one of the trails, near the greenhouse and springs. It opened on January 12, 1968, and was burnt down early in the morning on July 20, 1979 by an unnamed teenager. In 1983, a new chalet was opened 75 yards northwest of the original site. Formerly known as the Russian Jack Springs Chalet, it was renamed after Alaskan geologist Lidia Selkregg in 2005.

The chalet is located near where the prison farm used to be; nearby is the remains of a root cellar used by prisoners and a house used by the assistant warden. The house has since been repurposed for use by the Northern Lights Model Railroad Club, which operate what is officially known as a train museum in the building.

=== Mann Leiser Memorial Greenhouse ===
Once the Municipal Greenhouse, the construction on what would become the Mann Leiser Memorial Greenhouse began in 1967. The greenhouse opened during the 1970s and was renamed in 1993. The greenhouse is open to the public and has a variety of plants, an aviary, and koi. As of 1979, it gave away surplus plants and clippings to the public. The greenhouse is divided into two sections, split by a set of stairs: a solarium and a tropical greenhouse with succulents, cacti, and benches. The greenhouse is attached to the Anchorage horticultural complex, which grows flowers for city landscaping. Seedlings are first started in December and grown inside until the end of May, when they are planted around town.

There is an annual holiday lights display outside the greenhouse in the middle of winter.
