= Campbell Lake (Anchorage, Alaska) =

Lake in the state of Alaska, United States

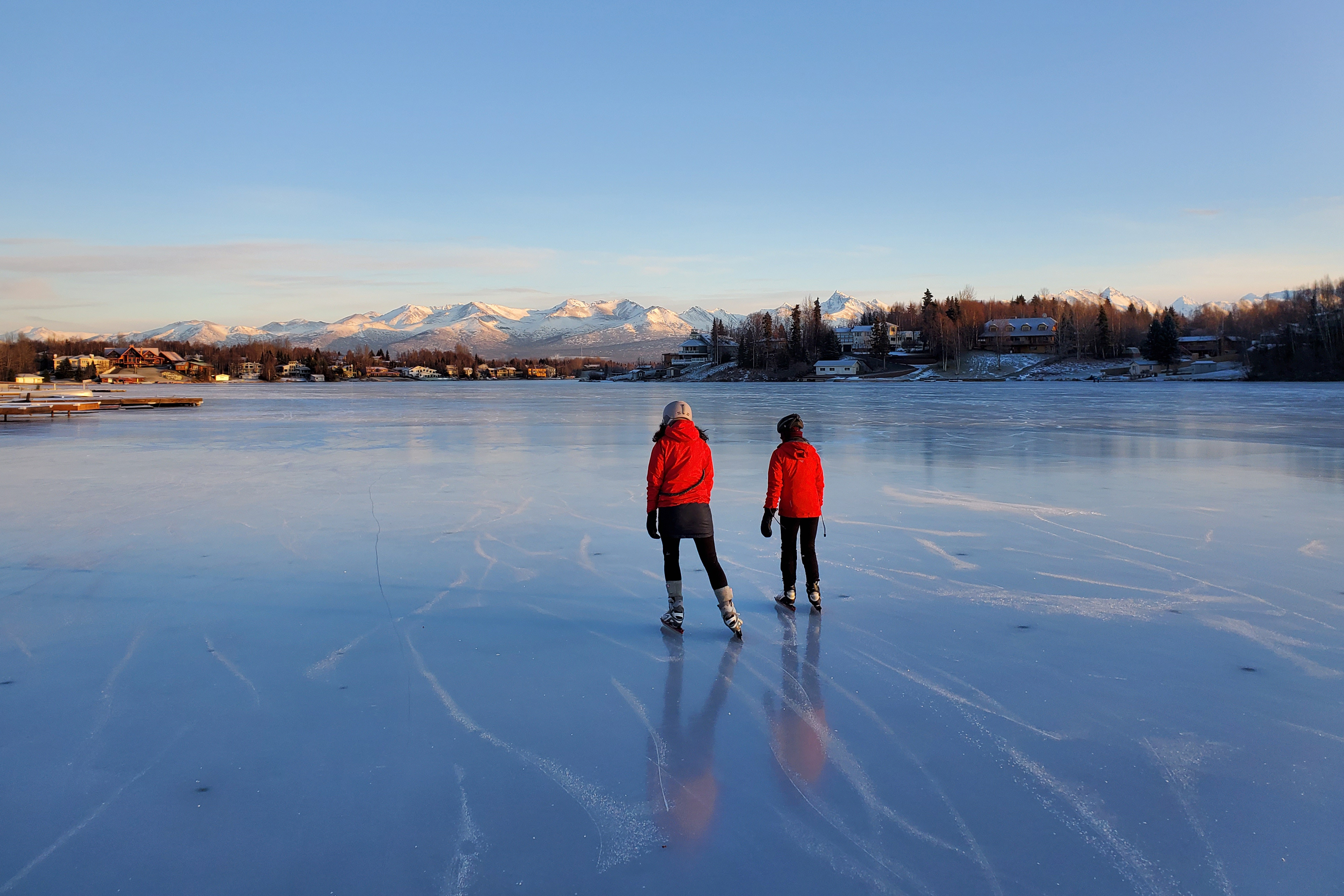
- Two ice skaters on Campbell Lake in winter

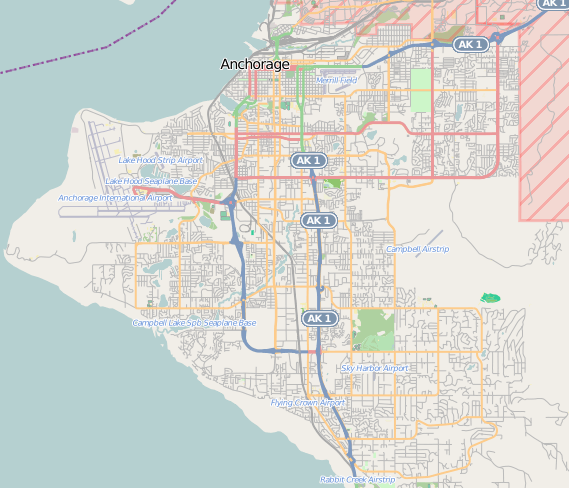
- Location within Alaska Location within Anchorage
- Location: Anchorage, Alaska
- Coordinates: 61.1324772°N 149.9413973°W
- Lake type: Reservoir
- Primary inflows: Campbell Creek
- Primary outflows: Campbell Creek estuary into Turnagain Arm
- Catchment area: 72 mi^{2} (190 km^{2})
- Basin countries: United States
- Max. length: 1.3 mi (2.1 km)
- Surface area: 123 acres (5,357,880 sq ft)
- Average depth: 1.5 m (4 ft 11 in)
- Max. depth: 5.6 m (18 ft)
- Water volume: 851,102 m^{3} (30,056,400 cu ft)
- Shore length^{1}: 18,603 ft (5,670 m)
- Surface elevation: 10 ft (3.0 m)
- Islands: None
- Settlements: Anchorage, Alaska
- ^{1} Shore length is not a well-defined measure.

Campbell Lake is a lake in Anchorage, Alaska, United States.

== History ==
Campbell Lake was formed in 1958 when Anchorage residents David Alm and George McCullough constructed an earthen dam to block the outflow of Campbell Creek, creating an artificial lake over intertidal wetlands. It is home to several notable Anchorage residents including former newspaper publisher Alice Rogoff, who hosted sitting US President Barack Obama at her lakeside residence in 2015 during his only visit to Alaska.

The Campbell Lake dam failed during the 1964 Anchorage earthquake and again in 1989 when heavy rains caused a nearly 20-fold increase in water flow into the lake. During the 2018 Anchorage earthquake, a sewer pipe became dislodged under the lakebed, requiring drainage of the lake in May 2019 for repairs.

== Hydrology and ecology ==
Campbell Lake receives inflow from a portion of the Chugach Mountains via the Campbell Creek watershed. Its outflow is a shallow estuary into Turnagain Arm. Lake water temperatures exhibit a thermocline in summer and a reverse thermocline in winter, with surface temperatures varying between approximately 0 °C (32 °F) in December to 18 °C (64 °F) in July.

At approximately 123 acres, Campbell Lake is the largest lake in Anchorage, Alaska. However, if considered as a single continuous body of water, the combination of nearby Lake Hood and Lake Spenard (which are connected by a natural channel) would be larger.

Several fish species in the lake include coho salmon, chinook salmon, and blackfish. The lake has been stocked with coho salmon by the Alaska Department of Fish and Game to support upstream sport fishing. However, fishing is not permitted in the lake.

== Ownership and access ==
In September 2019, Campbell Lake was the subject of an investigative report arguing that the lake, which was long held to be private, was public under Alaska statutory law. In December 2019, the City of Anchorage and the State of Alaska released a joint statement clarifying that the lake is open to the public for "boating and all forms of permissible recreation."

Campbell Lake can be legally accessed by the public in one of three ways:

1. By water, using Campbell Creek
2. By air, using a floatplane or other aircraft
3. By land, using one of two public easements, both of which can be used "without permission" of private property owners. These easements were surveyed and marked in January 2020.

== See also ==
- List of lakes of Alaska
- Sturgeon v. Frost – Two Supreme Court of the United States cases about public access to Alaskan navigable waterways.
