= Denaʼina Civic and Convention Center =

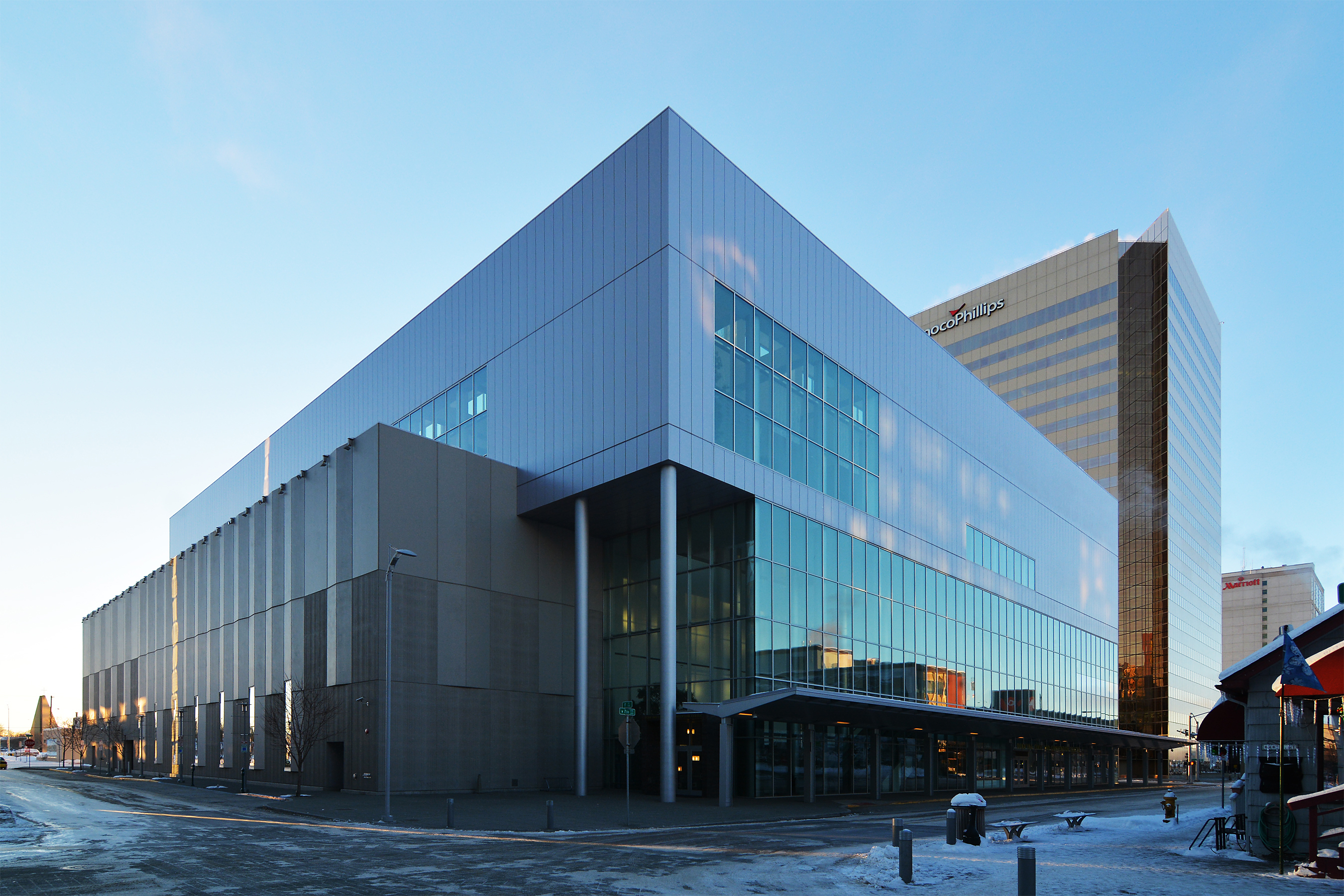
- The Denaʼina Civic and Convention Center in downtown Anchorage, Alaska, with the Conoco-Phillips building visible in the background.

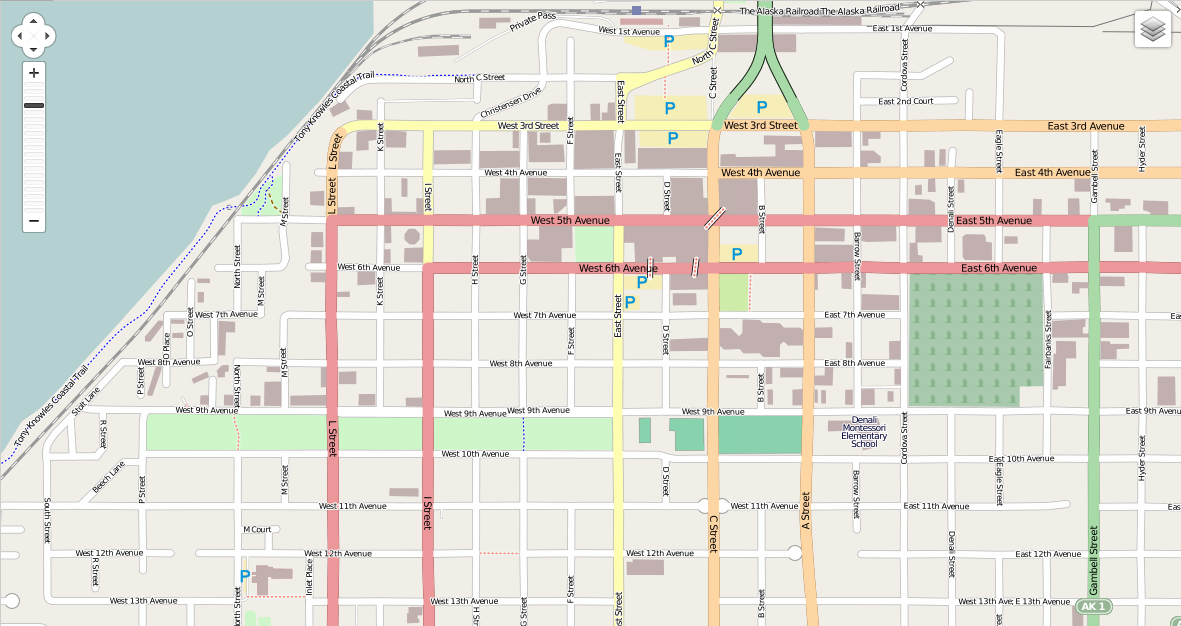
- Location within Downtown Anchorage Location within Alaska
- Alternative names: Denaʼina Center

General information
- Type: Civic and Convention Center
- Location: 600 West 7th Avenue, Anchorage, Alaska
- Coordinates: 61.215°N 149.894°W
- Opening: September 2008

Website
- denaina.anchorageconventioncenters.com

The Dena'ina Civic and Convention Center is a convention center in downtown Anchorage, Alaska, United States. The $111 million, 200,000-square-foot (19,000 m^{2}) facility opened in September 2008. The Denaʼina Center increased Anchorage's civic and convention capacity by 300 percent. It offers visitors an opportunity to learn about the Denaʼina people who have lived in the Cook Inlet Region since just after the last Ice Age. The meeting rooms and other areas of the Denaʼina Center have Athabascan names. Colors throughout the building reflect the colors of the area's changing seasons. The artwork in the building tells the story of the Denaʼina people — today and in the past.

The center is used for conventions, trade shows, meetings, and other events, including concerts. The Denaʼina Center is used in conjunction with The Egan Civic & Convention Center and the Alaska Center for the Performing Arts. These three facilities form the Anchorage Convention District and are joined by heated sidewalks.

The Denaʼina Center's 47,400-square-foot Idlughet (Eklutna) Exhibit Hall, in addition to being used for conventions and trade shows, also doubles as a 5,000-seat theater for concerts, graduation ceremonies, and other special events.
