= Campbell Lake (Carver and McLeod counties, Minnesota) =

Lake in the state of Minnesota, United States

- Location within Minnesota
- Location: Carver County, Minnesota and McLeod County, Minnesota
- Coordinates: 44°56′19″N 94°0′45″W
- Type: Lake
- Surface elevation: 991 feet (302 m)

Campbell Lake is a lake in Carver and McLeod counties in Minnesota, in the United States. It is located within Hollywood and McLeod townships.

Campbell Lake was named for the family of Patrick Campbell, early settlers.

== See also ==
- List of lakes in Minnesota
