= Goose Lake (Anchorage) =

Lake in the state of Alaska, United States

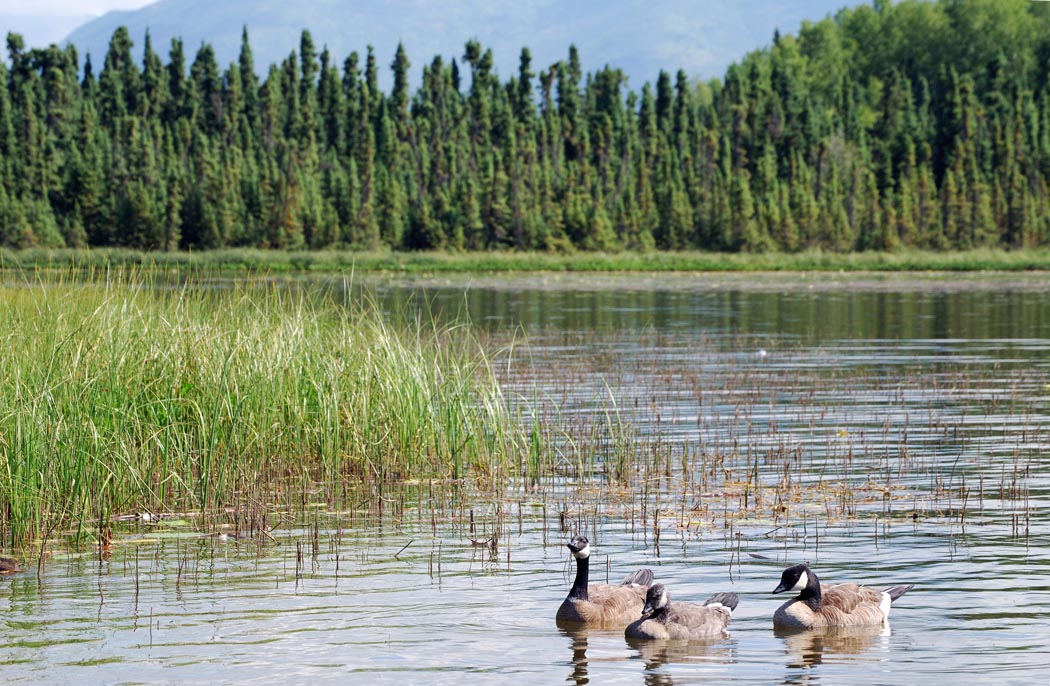

- Location within Alaska Location within North America
- Location: Anchorage, Alaska
- Coordinates: 61°11′44″N 149°49′15″W
- Basin countries: United States
- Max. length: 0.3 miles (0.48 km)
- Surface elevation: 141 feet (43 m)
- Settlements: Anchorage
- References: U.S. Geological Survey Geographic Names Information System: Goose Lake

Goose Lake is a small lake in Anchorage in the U.S. state of Alaska, located near the University of Alaska Anchorage, 1.2 miles (1.9 km) south-east of confluence of North and South Forks Chester Creek, and 2.8 miles (4.5 km) south-east of Anchorage, Cook Inlet Low. It is a popular swimming location in summer, with one of two municipal beaches, and is connected to the city's extensive trail system. It is a kettle lake.

== See also ==
- List of lakes of Alaska
