= Chester Creek (Alaska) =

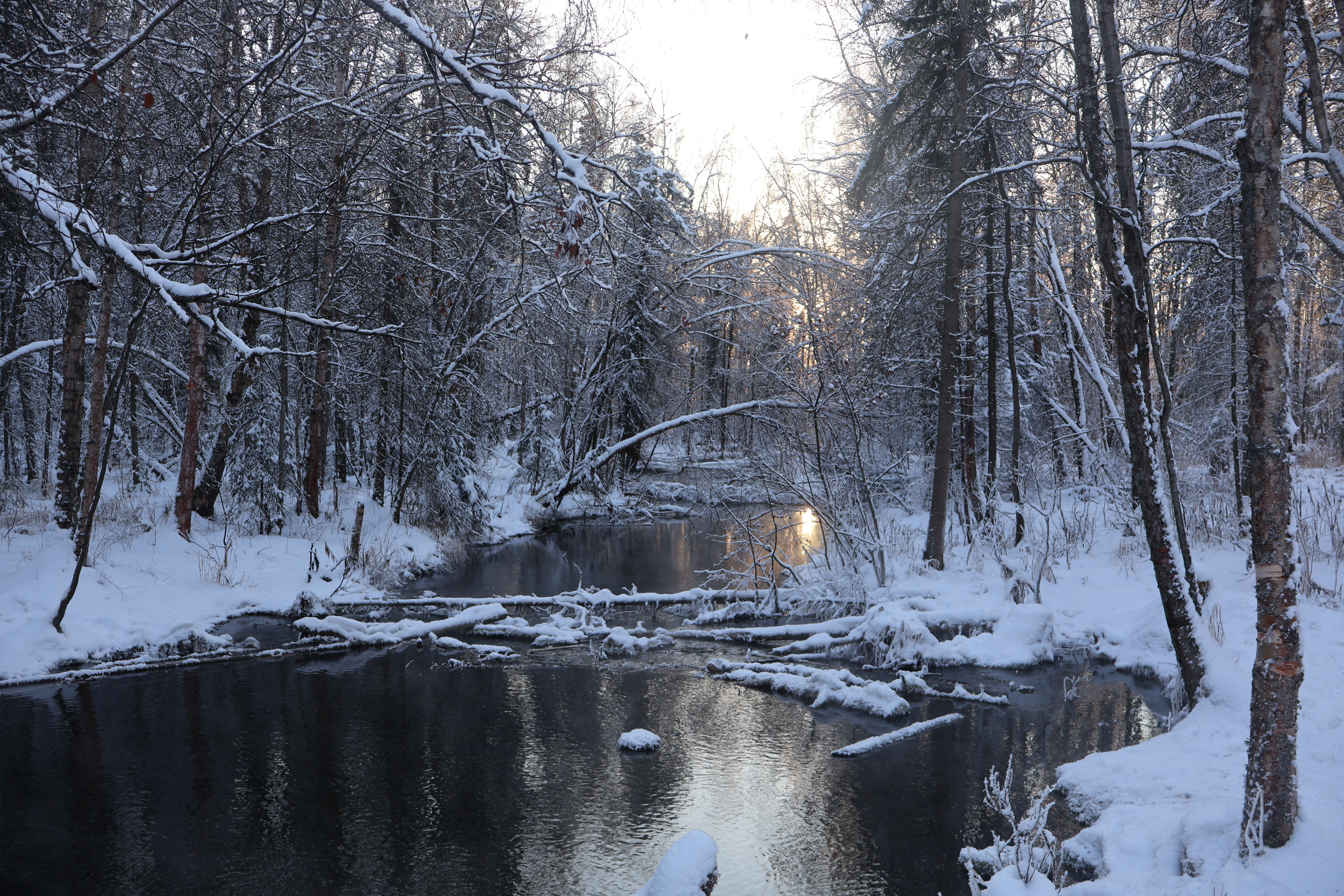
- Middle Fork Chester Creek in Russian Jack Springs Park

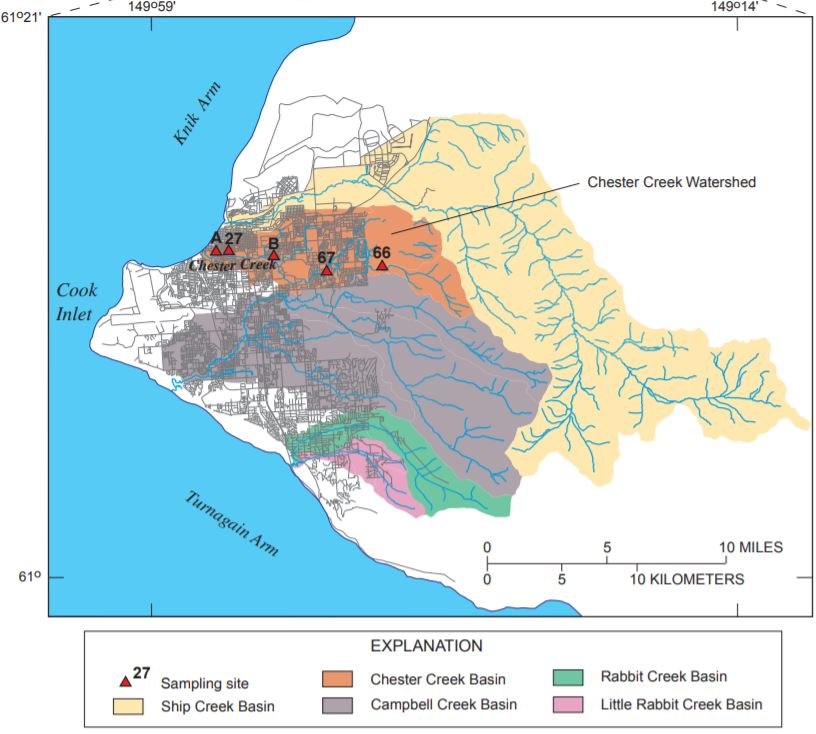
- Drainage basin of Chester Creek and other Anchorage waterways

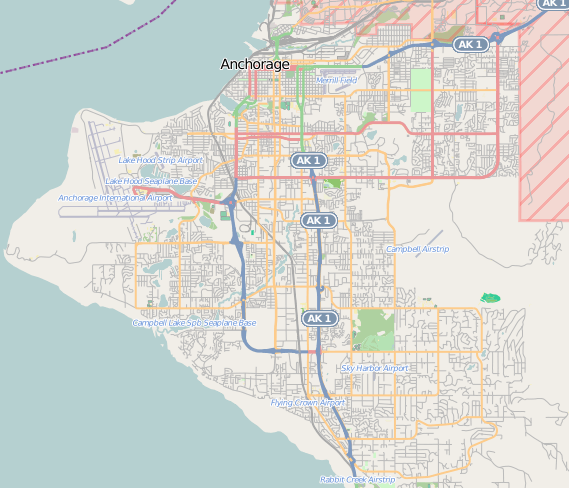
- Location of the mouth of the Chester Creek in Alaska Chester Creek (Alaska) (Alaska)
- Native name: Chanshtnu (Denaʼina)

Location
- Country: United States
- State: Alaska
- Municipality: Anchorage

Physical characteristics
- Source
  - location: Chugach Mountains
- Mouth: Knik Arm, Cook Inlet
  - coordinates: 61.20833°N 149.92475°W
- Length: 21 mi (34 km)
- Basin size: 30.5 sq mi (79 km^{2})
- Discharge
  - location: Arctic Blvd
  - average: 21 cu ft/s (0.59 m^{3}/s)

Chester Creek (Dena'ina: Chanshtnu) is one of several streams that flow through the city of Anchorage, Alaska. It runs for 21 miles (34 km) from the Chugach Mountains to the Knik Arm of Cook Inlet.

The creek connects a number of parks, open spaces, and lakes to form a green corridor running from east to west through the city. A paved trail follows the creek for part of its course through the areas from Goose Lake to Westchester Lagoon.

The Chester Creek drainage roughly includes most of the old City of Anchorage.

== History ==
Before English speaking settlers, the Dena'ina inhabited the area and were known to use Chanshtnu, or "Grass Creek," as a salmon fishing camp. The word Chanshtnu was later transcribed to Chester, giving us the name we now use.

The areas surrounding the creek were developed as Anchorage expanded east in the first half of the 20th century, although some portions were also designated as green spaces. In 1971, as part of the reconstruction following the 1964 Alaska earthquake, existing parks were merged with new purchases to connect Russian Jack Springs to Cook Inlet, creating one of the oldest urban greenbelts in the country. This greenbelt included an area around the outlet of the creek that had subsided during the earthquake, causing it to become partly submerged at high tide. Construction of a permanent embankment flooded this area to form Westchester lagoon, while the remaining area was rehabilitated as parkland.

== Watershed ==
The drainage basin of Chester Creek includes a number of tributaries, seven drainages each with its own headwaters, Westchester Lagoon, Hilstrand pond, Baxter Bog, and several lakes (including Mosquito Lake, University Lake, Reflection Lake, and Cheney Lake). There are three forks, the largest of which is the South Fork:

- The South Fork headwaters originate in the Chugach Mountains including a broad area within Fort Richardson of Joint Base Elmendorf–Richardson east of Muldoon road. It flows west through a residential area to University Lake (an old gravel pit), the Providence Hospital campus, and the University of Alaska campus before joining the Middle Fork near Goose Lake.
- The Middle Fork emerges from Russian Jack Springs. Its drainage includes Goose Lake and residential land in Northeast Anchorage.
- The short North Fork, whose natural course has been altered by property development, now emerges from the ground near Merrill Field at the corner of 15th Avenue and Lake Otis Parkway. Its drainage includes the area surrounding Alaska Regional Hospital, the Northway Mall, and parts of Mountain View.

Lower Chester Creek forms from the confluence of the North and South Forks and continues to the outlet of Westchester Lagoon where it flows into Knik Arm.

The Chester Creek watershed abuts the watersheds of Ship Creek to the north and both Fish Creek and Campbell Creek to the south.

== Chester Creek Trail ==
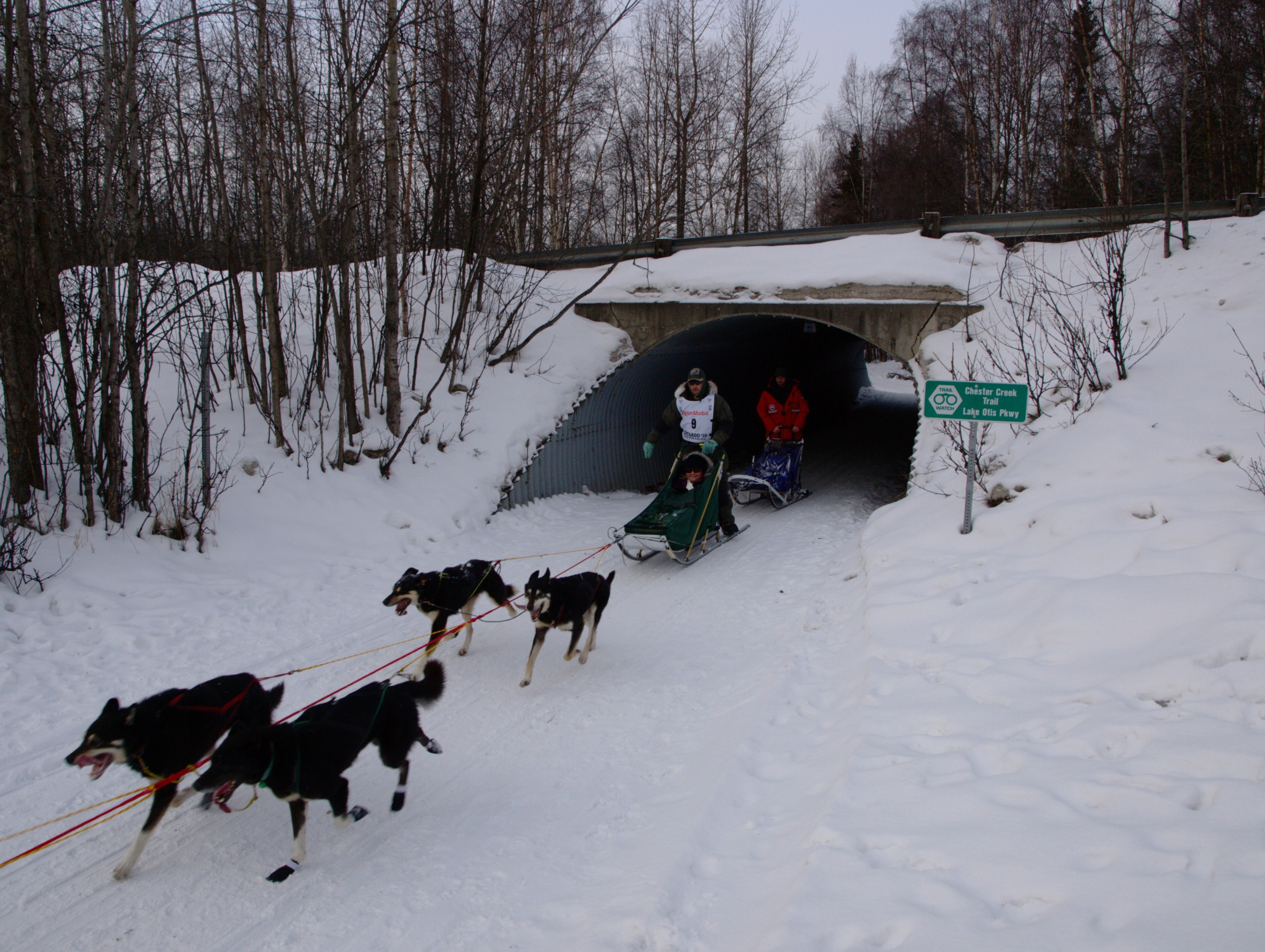
Chester Creek Trail in winter

Like its designation as a greenbelt, the development of the trail into an integrated exercise and transit thoroughfare was pushed by activist citizens. Lanie Fleischer, in 1972, organized the Anchorage Bike Committee with a cohort of other Anchorage citizens. After a successful 'bike in' that drew some 300 residents, city planners began to move forward with a dedicated pedestrian path along the Chester Creek in 1973. This was the first of what was to become a network of multi-use trails within the city.

Renamed the Lanie Fleischer Chester Creek Trail in 1994, the four mile long trail is popular with cyclists in summer, and skiers in winter. A comprehensive three year improvement project for the trail, with an estimated cost of US$3.2 million, began in 2012.

During the summer of 2015, the trail became the subject of a week-long interaction between a group of artists and users of the trail. The project called Seeking the Source, was aimed at finding out what experiences and recollections the residents of Anchorage had about the trail, and what part it plays in shaping perceptions of the local geography, its wildlife and community.

== Wildlife ==
The creek fosters a diverse range of flora and fauna including migrating fish, large mammals such as moose and bears, and wildfowl, which are a feature of the various lakes.

In the 1970s, the original free-flowing outlet of the creek was modified with the construction of the dam and outlet structure forming Westchester Lagoon. This alteration and later modifications meant that Coho salmon and Dolly Varden trout were prevented from easily entering the creek.

Following changes to the dam outlet in 2009 to improve fish transit, the numbers of Coho and Pink salmon passing into the creek increased dramatically, with over 2000 fish logged in 2013 compared to fewer than 500 in 2008. There are also efforts in place to revitalize the creek as a habitat for these salmon species through integrated works by the United States Fish and Wildlife Service and the Anchorage Office of Fish and Game.

There is a large moose habitat that incorporates parts of the creek. In order to better serve these animals, efforts are being made to eradicate the Mayday trees which although attractive, are not a beneficial food source for the animals.

== Hydrology ==
The streamflow of the Chester Creek has been measured by the USGS since 1966. The stream gauge site near the Arctic Boulevard bridge measures 90% of the watershed, specifically 27.4 square miles (71 km^{2}) of the total 30.5 square miles (79 km^{2}).

The mean flow between 1966 and 2013 was 21.2 cubic feet per second (0.60 m^{3}/s), with the lowest daily flow recorded in February 1975 at 1.6 cubic feet per second (0.045 m^{3}/s). The highest creek level recorded occurred in September 2012 with a height of 5.9 feet (1.8 m) through the gauge, giving a corresponding flow of 454 cubic feet per second (12.9 m^{3}/s).

== See also ==
- Ship Creek, Alaska
- Campbell Creek (Alaska)
- List of rivers of Alaska
