= Campbell Creek (Alaska) =

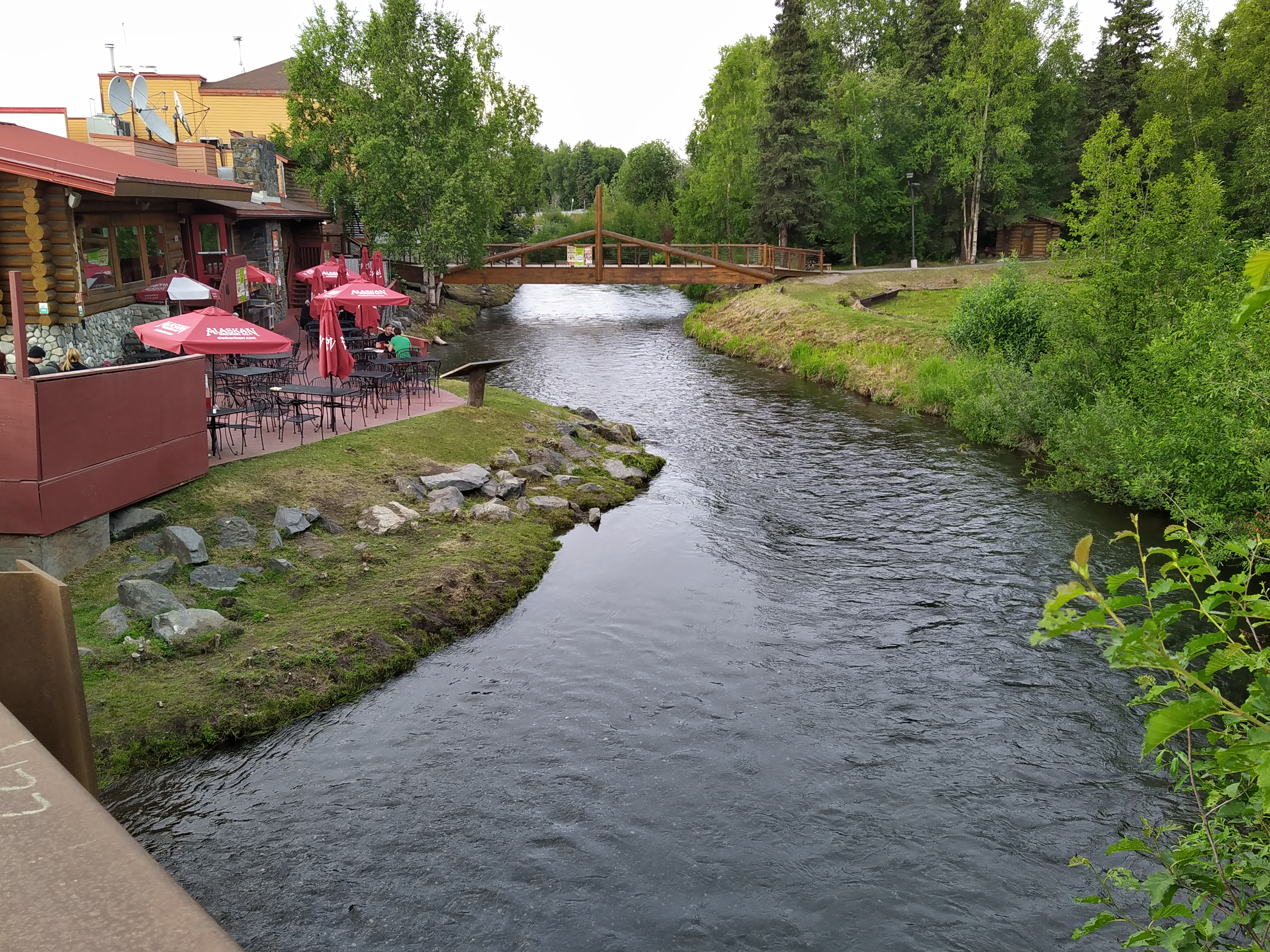
- Campbell Creek looking upstream from the Old Seward Highway bridge, where it passes through a somewhat densely-populated stretch on the southern fringes of midtown Anchorage

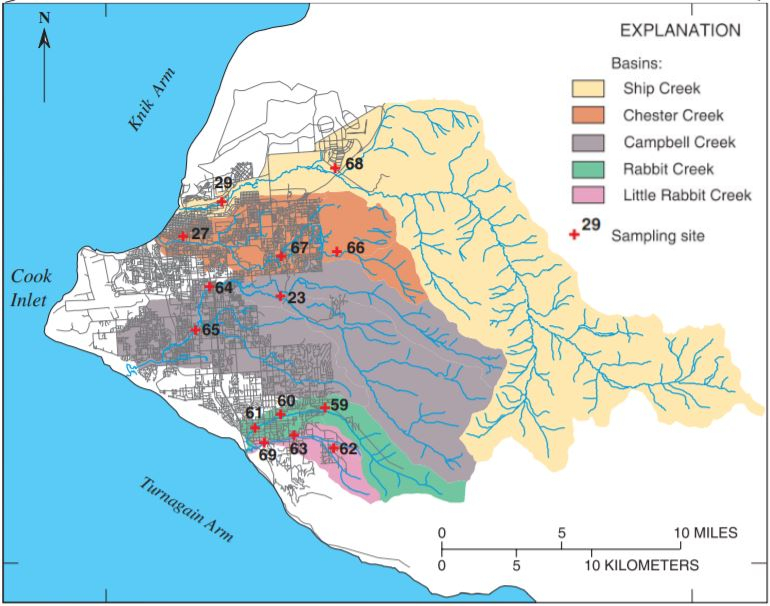
- Watersheds of Anchorage rivers, with Campbell Creek in gray

- Location of the mouth of Campbell Creek in Alaska
- Native name: Qin Cheghitnu (Denaʼina)

Location
- Country: United States
- State: Alaska
- Municipality: Anchorage

Physical characteristics
- Source: Confluence of north and south forks
  - location: Long Lake (North fork), Williwaw Lakes (Middle fork), Green Lake (South fork)
- Mouth: Turnagain Arm, Anchorage
  - coordinates: 61.124°N 149.977°W
- Length: 21 mi (34 km)
- Discharge
  - location: Dimond Blvd near Spenard
  - average: 68 cu ft/s (1.9 m^{3}/s)

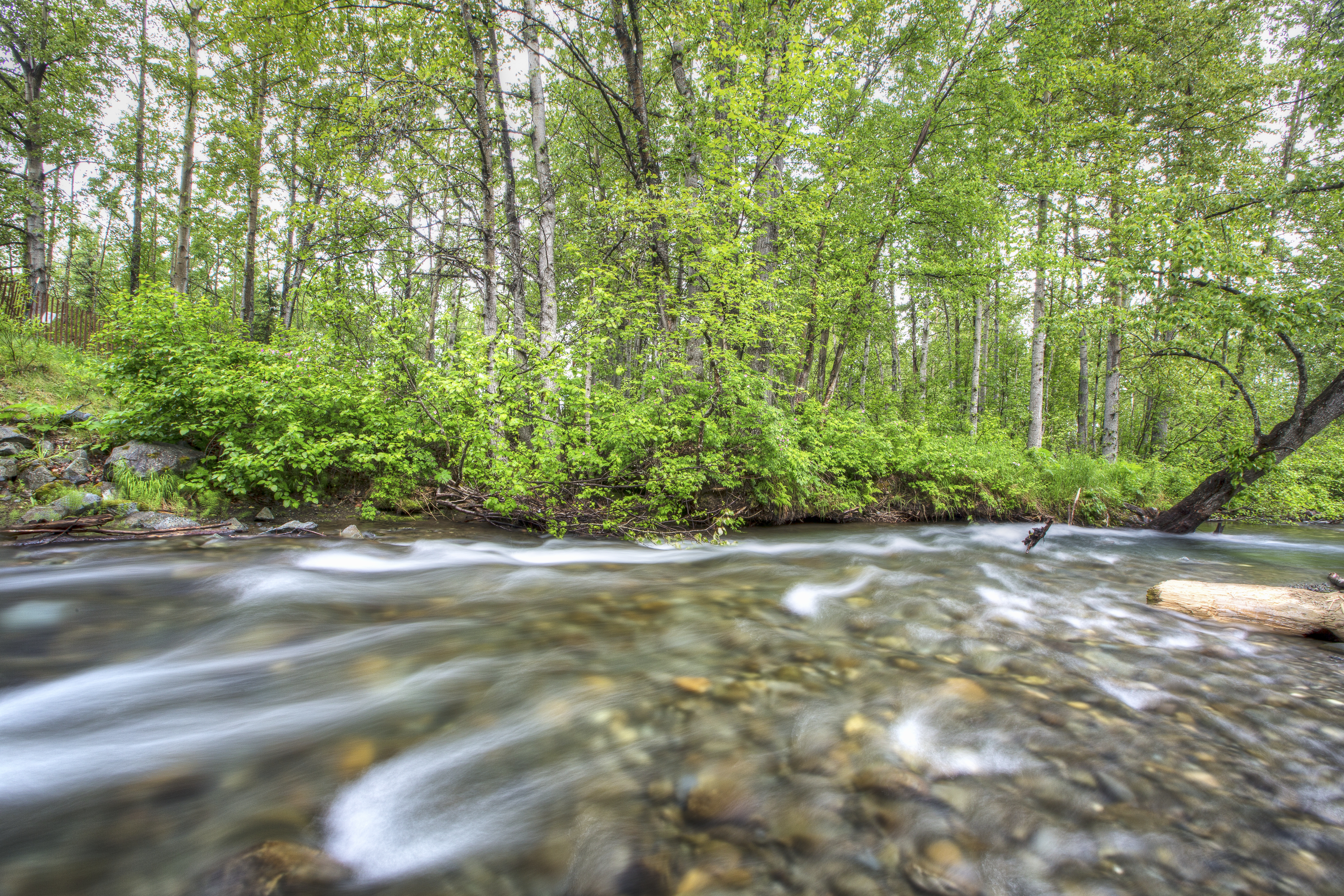
Summertime view of upper Campbell Creek, which passes through the Campbell Tract, a multiple-use area managed by the Bureau of Land Management.

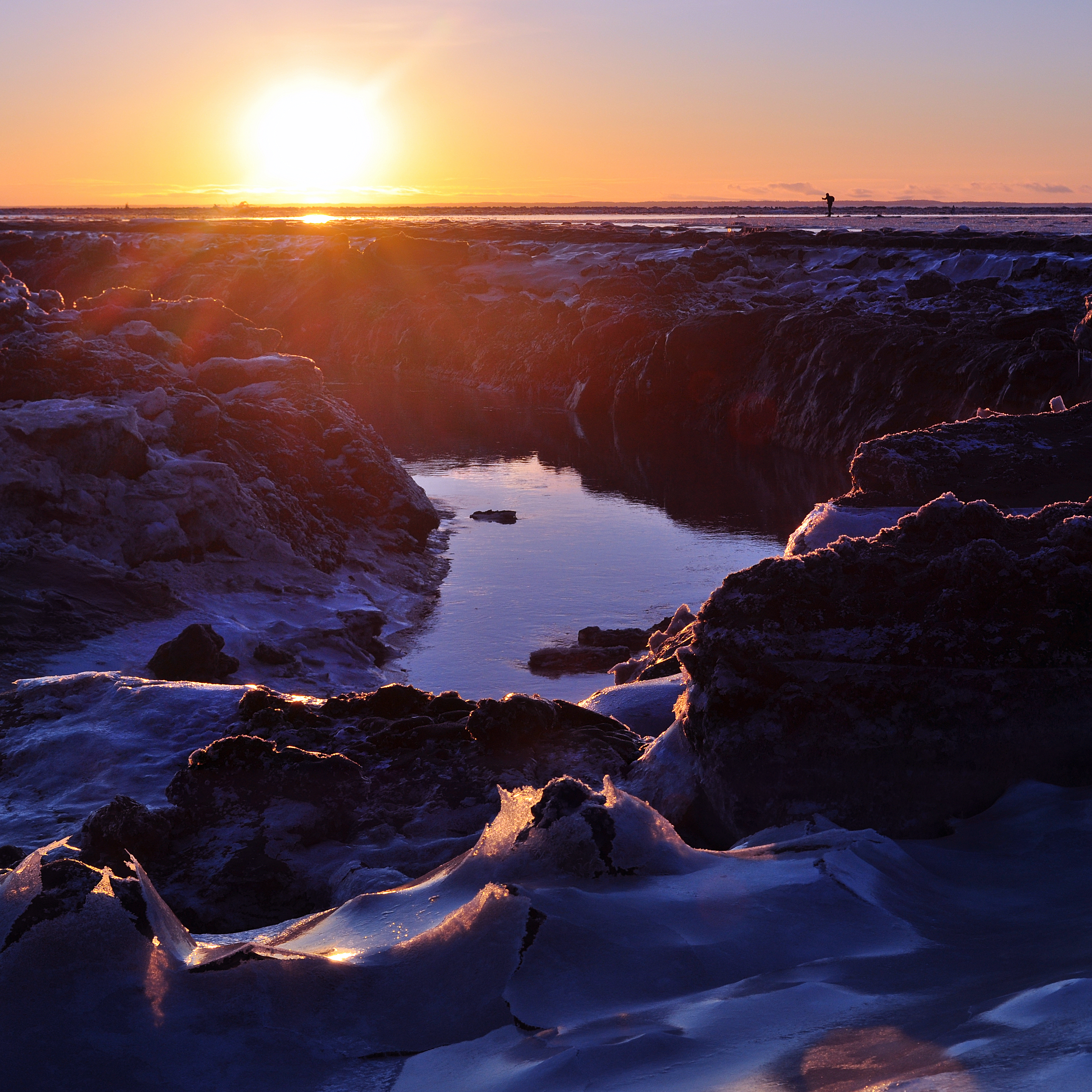
Campbell Creek as it winds through mudflats in between Campbell Lake and its mouth at Turnagain Arm.

Campbell Creek (Dena'ina: Qin Cheghitnu) is one of several streams that flow through the city of Anchorage, Alaska. It runs for 21 miles (34 km) from the Chugach Mountains to the Turnagain Arm of Cook Inlet.

The main stem of the creek is formed at the junction of the North and South Forks, which flows in a south-westerly direction through Campbell Lake, before reaching the Turnagain Arm. The watershed of the Campbell Creek includes a number of tributaries, including the Little Campbell Creek, the Lower Campbell Creek, and the Middle Fork.

The creek connects a number of parks, open spaces and lakes to form a green corridor running from east to west through the city. The paved Campbell Creek trail follows the creek for much of its lower course through the areas from Campbell Park to Campbell Lake, over a distance of seven miles.

== History ==
Before English-speaking settlers arrived in Anchorage, the Dena'ina inhabited the area. They called the creek Qin Cheghitnu or Crying Ridge Creek. The Crying Ridge referred to Tanaina Peak in the Chugach Mountains, in the upper reaches of the creek, which was considered to be a place of bereavement.

The European name of Campbell Creek is a derivative of Point Campbell, where the Knik and Turnagain arms of Cook Inlet meet.

== Usage ==
During summer, Campbell Creek is popular for inner tubing and kayaking.

== Hydrology ==
The discharge of the Campbell Creek has been measured by the USGS since 1966. The stream gauge site at the Dimond Boulevard Bridge near Spenard measures flow from an area of 69.7 square miles (181 km^{2}). The mean flow between 1966 and 2013 was 67.7 cubic feet per second (1.92 m^{3}/s), with the lowest daily flow recorded in February 1969 at 2.2 cubic feet per second (0.062 m^{3}/s).

The highest river level recorded occurred in August 1989 with a height of 23 feet (7.0 m) through the gauge, giving a corresponding flow of 1,510 cubic feet per second (43 m^{3}/s).

River discharge is closely related to seasonality and seasonal precipitation. First spring flush usually takes place shortly after snowmelt, between March and April, lasting until June/ July. A second flush of discharge often takes place after heavy rains during August/ September.

With climate change, these patterns are likely to change, as snow accumulation and mean water availability are expected to decrease and mean temperature is expected to increase.

== See also ==
- Ship Creek, Alaska
- Chester Creek (Alaska)
- Campbell Lake
- List of rivers of Alaska
