= Egan Center =

William A. Egan Civic and Convention Center
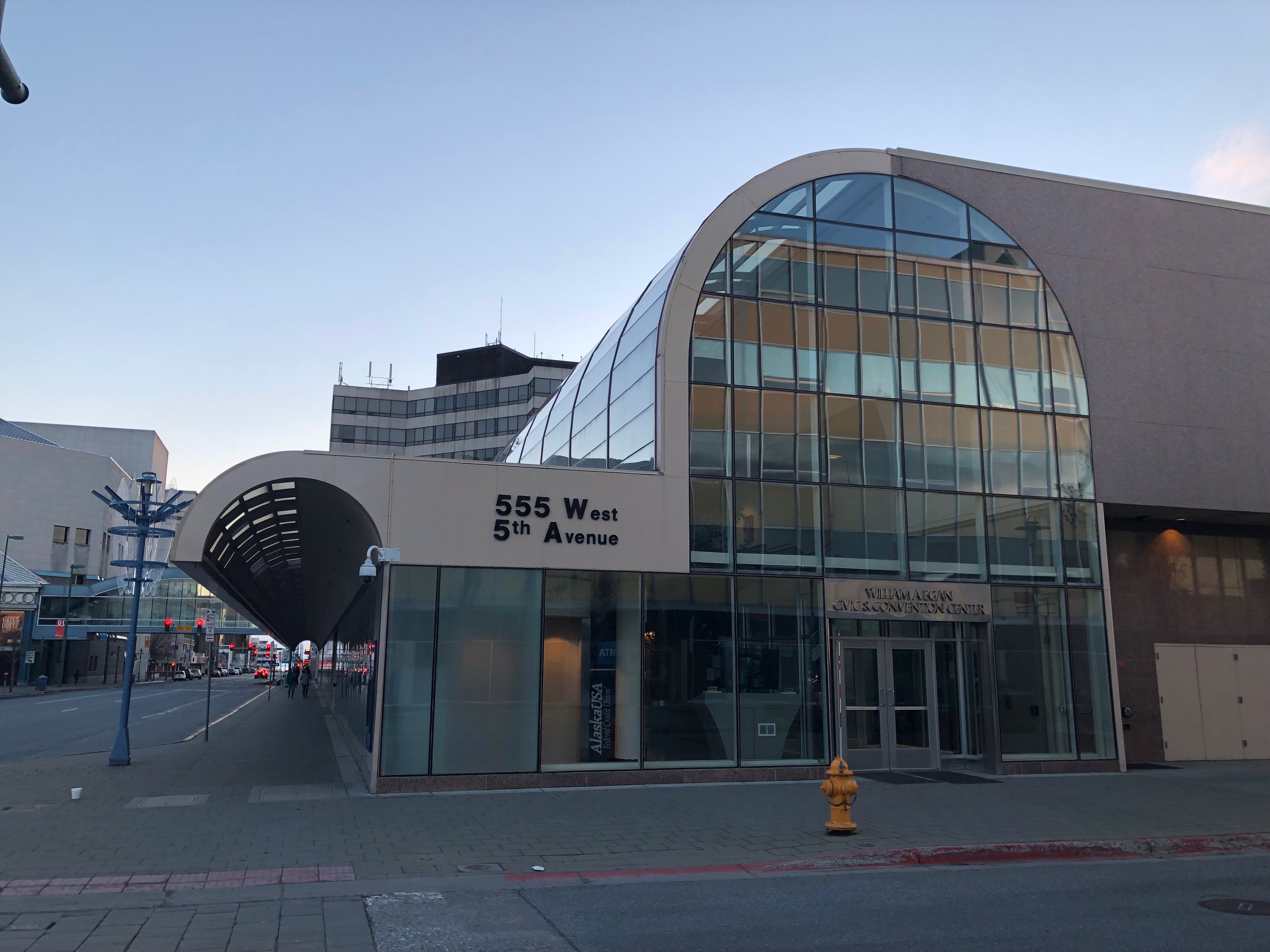
- The Egan Center on West Fifth Avenue, Anchorage
- Interactive map of the William A. Egan Civic and Convention Center area

General information
- Type: Convention center
- Location: Downtown Anchorage, Alaska, US, 555 West Fifth Avenue
- Coordinates: 61.217865°N 149.892418°W
- Named for: William Allen Egan
- Completed: 1984

Technical details
- Floor area: 45,000 square feet (4,200 m^{2})

Design and construction
- Architects: CCC Architects and Planners

Website
- egan.anchorageconventioncenters.com

The William A. Egan Civic and Convention Center (commonly known as simply the Egan Center) is a 45,000-square-foot (4,200 m^{2}) convention center located in downtown Anchorage, Alaska at 555 West Fifth Avenue. Constructed in 1984 as part of a massive Anchorage-wide public works project dubbed "Project 80s", it replaced the original Z. J. Loussac Library, which opened on the same site in 1955 and was demolished in 1981. The library moved to a new building in midtown Anchorage, also as part of Project 80s. The building is named for Alaska's first governor, William Allen Egan. It features a unique glass front that runs the entire length of the facility providing the reception area and the giant Ficus retusa trees inside with plenty of natural light. A skywalk across Fifth Avenue connects the building to the Alaska Center for the Performing Arts.

The building was designed by CCC Architects and Planners of Anchorage.

In 2008, Anchorage opened a second downtown convention center: the Denaʼina Civic and Convention Center.
