= Chuitna River =

River in Alaska, United States

Coordinates: 61°05′36″N 151°06′31″W

The Chuitna River, sometimes called the Chuit, emerges from a broad expanse of forest and wetlands west of Anchorage, Alaska and drains into Cook Inlet. The river and its tributaries support all five species of Pacific salmon, Dolly Varden and trout, and the region is home to abundant wildlife, including moose, wolves, and bears. The area attracts sports fishing and hunting enthusiasts, and supports subsistence hunting and fishing activities. River fish stocks enhance Cook Inlet salmon populations.

== Description ==
The Chuitna's 25-mile (40 km) length courses from its headwaters at the base of the Alaska Range to its mouth at Cook Inlet between the remote Alaskan villages of Tyonek and Beluga on the west shore of upper Cook Inlet. The waterway and its tributaries are vital to the subsistence lifestyles of local residents whose villages are not connected to Alaska's road system. Though marked on some maps as highways, the only roads in the area are primitive structures left behind from past oil and gas exploration and logging activities. The piedmont lowlands are covered in birch, poplar, and spruce forests and muskeg. Toward the northwest, the topography rises to a treeless plateau that extends to the Alaska Range. The local climate varies between maritime and continental, with annual rainfall measuring about 100 cm in the Chuitna River basin.

== Geology ==
The river cuts through glacial deposits overlain by Tertiary-aged sedimentary rocks. Plateaus between drainages release their water poorly and are prone to extensive bogs and marshes, ponds and lakes, but alluvial corridors along stream courses are free draining.

== Development ==
The area through which the Chuitna and its tributaries flow is rich in coal and is known as the Beluga Coal Fields. PacRim Coal LP, a Delaware Corporation, holds a lease on 20,571 acres (83.2 km^{2}) of land within the coal fields. The corporation is pursuing state and federal permits for a massive surface strip mine called the Chuitna Coal Project. If granted those permits, PacRim proposes to excavate as much as 1 billion metric tons of coal from the lease territory over several decades. PacRim officials have said the mine would create 300 to 350 jobs and a tax revenue stream to local and state government coffers.

== Conservation ==
Critics say the mine would devastate as much as 30 square miles (78 km^{2}) of wildlife habitat and destroy vital tributaries to the Chuitna River, including some 11 miles (18 km) of salmon spawning and rearing sites. Permitting the mine would be unprecedented, marking the first time Alaska had ever permitted mining through an active salmon stream. The sub-bituminous coal would most likely be shipped to Asian markets. Because the area coal deposits are the target of coal developers, the non-profit organization American Rivers named the Chuitna one of America's Most Endangered Rivers in 2007 and again in 2015.
