= Chuitna Coal Project =

Proposed coal strip mine in Alaska

The Chuitna Coal Project was a proposed coal strip mine that, if granted state and federal permits, would have been built about 45 miles (72 km) southwest of Anchorage, Alaska, in an area known as the Beluga Coal Fields near the Chuitna River and the small communities of Tyonek and Beluga in upper Cook Inlet.

== Proposal ==
The Chuitna Coal Project was a proposal of PacRim LP, a Delaware-based corporation owned by the Texas-based energy company Petro-Hunt LLC. PacRim holds a state lease to 20,571 acres (83.2 km^{2}) of Alaska Mental Health Trust property where an estimated 1 billion metric tons of low-sulfur, sub-bituminous coal was thought to exist. Proven reserves are reported to be 771 million tons. The company was in the advanced stages of state and federal mine-permitting processes. PacRim had surveyed three Logical Mining Units, or LMUs, within its lease. If permitted, the company had said it planned to extract up to 12 million metric tons of coal from the first of these units over a minimum period of 25 years. Other LMUs could have been developed in future years.

The surface coalmine itself was to have eventually spread to cover 30 square miles (78 km^{2}), but the project also would have included assorted support facilities, a mine road and a 12 miles (19 km) long, covered conveyor system to transport coal to Cook Inlet at Ladd Landing where a port facility would have been built. Ladd Landing was property owned by the Kenai Peninsula Borough and subject to a lease-option held by PacRim. A letter of intent to exercise the Ladd Landing option was filed by PacRim in March, 2009. For more, see Lease-Option History section below.

=== Geography ===
The proposed Chuitna Coal Project mine site was located within PacRim's lease area at: Sec 14, 15, 21-28 and 33-36, T13N, R12W, Seward Meridian.

=== Land ownership ===
Land within and around PacRim's lease area was owned by a variety of entities, including the State of Alaska, the Alaska Mental Health Trust Authority, the Kenai Peninsula Borough, the Tyonek Native Corp., Cook Inlet Region, Inc. (CIRI), and private owners. The state of Alaska owns about 132,500 acres (536 km^{2}) (including mental health lands), and coal leases have been issued on some 46,000 acres (190 km^{2}), including the 20,571 acres (83.2 km^{2}) leased to PacRim. The Susitna Flats Wildlife Refuge are near the former project zone to the northeast and the Trading Bay Wildlife Refuge is nearby to the southwest. According to the state, neither would have been affected by the mining project. Tyonek Native Corp. owns more than 40,000 acres (160 km^{2}) to the southeast. CIRI owns a scattering of properties around the former potential mine site. The Kenai Peninsula Borough owns 16,800 acres (68 km^{2}) south of the former potential mine lease boundary and a small area of land around Beluga and Ladd Landing. Private land was mostly along the Cook Inlet coastline in Beluga, Tyonek, as well as at North Forelands and south of Granite Point, which are coastal locations south of Tyonek.

=== Lease-option history ===
The Kenai Peninsula Borough-PacRim Ladd Landing lease-option document shows that in 1987 the borough entered a lease-option agreement with Tidewater Services Corp, which merged with Midgard Energy Co., in 1994. That year, Midgard assigned its option to Richard Bass, William Herbert Hunt, and William Herbert Hunt Trust Estate. The option was extended multiple times through years while coal mining in the state lease area remained financially impractical. Early in 2008, Bass, Hunt and the Hunt Trust Estate assigned the Ladd Landing option to PacRim Coal LP. In March 2009, PacRim signed a letter of intent to exercise its Ladd Landing option. As of April 2009, the Kenai Peninsula Borough's Land Management Office had begun the process of bringing that lease to closing under the existing 1987 terms, a process that had to be completed within 180 days. According to borough officials, the two sides were to have renegotiated terms they had mutually agreed were outdated and in need of revision.

=== Access ===
No roads connected the project area to Alaska's highway system. The areas were accessible only by sea and air. Airstrips exist at Beluga and Tyonek. PacRim proposed to build a third airstrip in the project area. ConocoPhillips had a private strip south of the Beluga Power Plant. Gravel roads connect Tyonek and Beluga, and there are remnants of old roads used for logging, oil, gas and coal exploration efforts. Barge landing areas exist at Ladd Landing, Tyonek and Granite Point, and are used to supply local residents.

=== Risks and rewards of development ===
Risks

Extracting coal from the Beluga Coal Fields was an idea decades old, but several factors had discouraged construction, including the costs associated with developing a mine, the market price of coal and the lack of demand for coal in Alaska, among others. Opposition to mining the fields had grown, specifically with respect to PacRim's Chuitna Coal Project, the project furthest along in state and federal permitting processes. Many Alaskans, including fisheries biologists, voiced opposition to the mine's proposed location amid environmentally important wetlands and because of the nature of coal itself. Critics charged that development would devastate more than 30 square miles (78 km^{2}) of critical wildlife habitat and destroy 11 miles (18 km) of salmon spawning streams. Alaska had no precedent for permitting mining in active salmon streams and no guarantee that post-mine mitigation would restore the ecosystems. Chuitna would have been the first. Because of PacRim's proposal, the non-profit organization American Rivers named the Chuitna one of America's 10 Most Endangered Rivers in 2007 and again in 2015. If the transport infrastructure to Cook Inlet had been built it was likely that coal mining in the region would have expanded over time.

Rewards

Chuitna's developers predicted mine construction and operation would have produced between 300 and 350 good paying jobs, and upwards of $350 million royalties to the state over the 25-year lifespan of the first Logical Mining Unit project. PacRim also expected numerous service contracts with the local business community. PacRim was to have developed Ladd Landing as a port (see above) for loading large vessels that would have transported the coal to Asian markets. The 300 million tons PacRim expected to excavate from its Chuitna mine was speculated to equal two-thirds of the total recoverable coal in the Beluga Coal Fields. Some estimates put the total at around 500 million tons. If the transport infrastructure to Cook Inlet had been built it was likely that coal mining in the region would have expanded over time.

=== Environmental issues of the mining phase ===
2006 revisions to PacRim's National Pollutant Discharge Elimination System (NPDES) filing with the Environmental Protection Agency (EPA) showed the company expected to discharge more than 7,400,000 US gallons (28,000 m^{3}) of mine area runoff daily into salmon-bearing tributaries of the Chuitna River, including Creek 2002 (Lone Creek), Creek 2003 (Middle Creek) and Creek 2004. That effluent would have reached Cook Inlet. The NPDES documents demonstrate that PacRim anticipated a variety of discharge pollutants, including organic carbon, assorted suspended solids, ammonia, nitrates, oil and grease, and metals including aluminum, iron, and manganese. In addition, housing and other operational facilities were expected to discharge small amounts of fecal coliform and residual chlorine. According to the NPDES filing, PacRim would have built four sedimentation ponds to remove some suspended solids. Three ponds would have received runoff from areas affected by mining operations. The fourth would have received runoff from mine facilities. Four outfall locations were to have discharged effluent to the fresh water creeks, waterbodies that support all five species of Pacific salmon as well as Dolly Varden and trout.

PacRim's mining project would have carved through more than 11 miles (18 km) of Middle Creek. Up to that point, no permit allowing mining operations to mine through and destroy a salmon stream had ever been issued by the Alaska Department of Natural Resources. Alaska strictly protects natural systems such as salmon streams. A clean, clear-water environment is crucial for successful natural salmon rearing.

PacRim's planned port at Ladd Landing would have affected existing shoreline salmon set-net fishing sites and the coal-loading trestle necessary to reach deep water would have affected fish migration zones and the habitat of the endangered Delphinapterus leucas, or white whale, that was distinct to Cook Inlet. Under provisions of the 1973 Endangered Species Act, the National Marine Fisheries Service placed the Cook Inlet species on the nation's Endangered Species list.

== See also ==
- Coal mining in the United States
