= Beluga Airport =

Airport in Alaska, United States

- IATA: BVU; ICAO: PABG; FAA LID: BLG

Summary
- Airport type: Private
- Owner: ConocoPhillips
- Serves: Beluga, Alaska
- Elevation AMSL: 87 ft (27 m)
- Coordinates: 61°10′23″N 151°02′43″W

Map
- Location of airport in Alaska

Runways
Direction	Length		Surface
Direction	ft	m	Surface
01/19	5,002	1,525	Gravel
09/27	2,505	764	Gravel

Statistics (1993)
- Aircraft operations: 5,600
- Source: Federal Aviation Administration

Beluga Airport (IATA: BVU, ICAO: PABG, FAA LID: BLG) is a private use airport in Beluga, in the Kenai Peninsula Borough of the U.S. state of Alaska. It is privately owned by ConocoPhillips (formerly ARCO).

As per Federal Aviation Administration records, the airport had 2,541 passenger boardings (enplanements) in calendar year 2008, 2,410 enplanements in 2009, and 2,144 in 2010.

Although most U.S. airports use the same three-letter location identifier for the FAA and IATA, this airport is assigned BLG by the FAA and BVU by the IATA (which assigned BLG to Belaga Airport in Belaga, Sarawak, Malaysia). The airport's ICAO identifier is PABG.

== Facilities and aircraft ==
Beluga Airport resides at elevation of 87 feet (27 m) above mean sea level. It has two runways with gravel surfaces: 1/19 is 5,002 by 100 feet (1,525 x 30 m) and 9/27 is 2,505 by 60 feet (764 x 18 m).

For the 12-month period ending January 15, 1993, the airport had 5,600 aircraft operations, an average of 15 per day: 91% general aviation and 9% air taxi.

== See also ==
- List of airports in Alaska
