= Fort St. Nicholas =

Fort St. Nicholas may refer to:

- Fort Saint-Nicolas, Marseille, France
- Fort Saint-Nicolas, New France (modern Wisconsin, United States)
- Fort Saint Nicholas, Rhodes, Greece
- Fort Nikolaevskaia, Alaska, United States
