= 2016–2017 Cook Inlet natural gas leak =

Natural gas leak in Alaska, United States

Coordinates: 60.7929°N 151.4694°W

- Location: Turnagain Arm, Cook Inlet, Alaska
- Date: December, 2016 – April 2017

Cause
- Cause: Holed pipeline
- Casualties: 0
- Operator: Hilcorp Energy

Spill characteristics
- Volume: 210,000 to 310,000 cubic feet per day
- Shoreline impacted: No

The Cook Inlet natural gas leak began in December 2016 when a pipeline ruptured, resulting in an underwater methane leak beneath Turnagain Arm in Cook Inlet near Nikiski, Alaska.

== Outcome ==
The escaped gas rose into Earth's atmosphere after clearing the surface. An estimated 6 to 8.8 million litres (210,000 to 310,000 cubic feet) of natural gas was released from the damaged pipe per day. The leak was first reported in February 2017. The pipeline operator, Hilcorp Energy, said that there was too much sea ice to safely launch a repair mission. They added that shutting off the flow of natural gas through the pipeline would compound the problem, because the pipe had previously been used to transport crude oil and the residual crude in the pipe would then be exposed to the sea water once the pipeline was depressurized.

The leak was reported to be dry natural gas being sent to the platforms as fuel, which consists of 99% methane. Divers reported that the leak was caused by the pipeline being laid across a rock on the ocean floor, resulting in a small hole.

Non-profit organizations representing the environment have either sued or expressed interest in suing Hilcorp Energy, claiming that the ongoing situation is a danger to beluga whales and other marine life.

The leak was repaired April 13, 2017 when divers were able to install a clamp on the leaking pipe.

== Litigation and state response ==
The Alaska-based environmental organization Cook Inlet Keeper has sent a letter to Hilcorp Energy, stating their intent to sue the energy company, for what the group alleges are violations of the Clean Water Act. The Center for Biological Diversity further alleges that Hilcorp Energy is in violation of four federal laws. In addition to the Clean Water Act, the Center maintains that Hilcorp is violating the Clean Air Act, the Endangered Species Act and the Pipeline Safety Act in a letter to the company announcing the Centers planned litigation against them.

In addition, the administration of Alaska Governor Bill Walker, through the cabinet-level Alaska Department of Environmental Conservation (ADEC), has demanded that Hilcorp Energy closely monitor the environmental impact of the ongoing leak. ADEC has also requested that Hilcorp hire specialists to look for dead fish and other marine life in the area, and to come up with a repair plan by March 8, 2017.
