= List of natural gas and oil production accidents in the United States =

Deepwater Horizon in flames after the explosion

This list is complementary to the List of pipeline accidents in the United States. Large accidents, qualifying as industrial disasters are included.

The production process encompasses all parts of the process from drilling for fuels to refining or processing to the final product. It also includes storage and disposal of waste. Unless otherwise stated, all accidents are associated with production wells.

Since many accidents involve transport of raw materials, several states included in this list have little or no fossil fuel production.

== Alabama ==
- November 8, 2013 – Pickens County, Crude oil train derails, fire, one person evacuated

== Alaska ==
- March 24, 1989 – The Exxon Valdez oil spill occurred in Prince William Sound, Alaska.
- December 31, 2012 – Offshore drilling rig breaks loose from tow, 18 evacuated
- 2016–2017 Cook Inlet natural gas leak
- April 14, 2017 - A BP well leaked oil & gas from the North Slope for 3 days.

== Arizona ==
- State had active oil and or gas wells as of April 2015 but no accidents have been uncovered.

== Arkansas ==
- September 2010 – March 2011 – Near Greenbrier, earthquake swarm near injection wells, largest 4.7
- May 21, 2012 - A fire and explosion broke out at an abandoned crude oil tank battery, near El Dorado.
- March 29, 2013 – Mayflower – "Exxon-Pegasus" oil pipeline spill, 22 homes evacuated
- November 12, 2014 – earthquake, see Kansas

== California ==
- Jan. 27, 1908 - Lightning struck tank number 3 of the Union Oil Co. tank farm at Avila. The bolt struck at 3:30 p.m. and ignited the oil stored in the tank.
- October 5, 1913 - A spark from a passing locomotive was blamed for starting a fire, in a 250,000 gallon tank of distillate oil at the San Diego Standard Oil tank yard. As the oil burned it threw sparks skyward, which rained down on several other tanks nearby, igniting them. The fire burned for 2 days.
- April 7, 1926 - A lightning-caused fire, involving a 1 million gallon tank, near San Luis Obispo.
- September 16, 1928 – George F. Getty Inc. well exploded at the Santa Fe Springs oil fields, igniting a fire that burned for almost two months.
- July 12, 1951 - A tank farm fire in Wilmington injured 3.
- September 1, 1968 - Lightning struck an oil storage surface reservoir, at the Standard Oil Company of California refinery in El Segundo, igniting the wooden roof, and started a fire on the 7.25-acre surface of bunker oil that burned for 13 days. An attack with seven high expansion and five low expansion foam generators produced more than 4 million cubic feet of foam. These efforts failed, however, and a controlled burnout had to be accepted.
- 1969 – The 1969 Santa Barbara oil spill. In January and February 1969, in the Santa Barbara Channel, near the city of Santa Barbara, in Southern California. It was the largest oil spill in United States waters at the time, and now ranks third after the 2010 Deepwater Horizon and 1989 Exxon Valdez spills. It remains the largest oil spill to have occurred in the waters off California.
- February 21, 1978 - An explosion & fire at a Rialto pipeline tank farm injured a passerby.
- February 9, 1980 - A tank farm fire in Kern County.
- April 10, 1989 – An explosion and fire occurred in a cracking column at the Chevron Richmond refinery. A total of 8 workers and firefighters were injured. Three workers suffered second and third degree burns.
- February 23, 1999 - A fire occurred in the crude unit at Tosco Corporation's Avon oil refinery in Martinez. Workers were attempting to replace piping attached to a 150-foot-tall fractionator tower while the process unit was in operation. During removal of the piping, naphtha was released onto the hot fractionator and ignited. The flames engulfed five workers located at different heights on the tower. Four men were killed, and one sustained serious injuries.
- March 25, 1999 – An explosion and fire, at the Chevron Richmond refinery, that spread noxious fumes, and sent hundreds of Richmond residents to hospitals.
- August 6, 2012 – A large fire erupted at the Chevron Richmond refinery. About 15,000 sought medical treatment for exposure to the smoke. On April 15, 2013, the US Chemical Safety Board released their preliminary report citing Chevron for a chronic failure to replace aging equipment and called for an overhaul of regulatory oversight of the industry to prevent such accidents from happening again.
- February 12, 2014, - Sulfuric acid burned two workers in a Martinez refinery's alkylation unit, who were transported to the nearest hospital burn unit by life flight. The incident occurred when the operators opened a block valve to return an acid sampling system back to service. Very shortly after this block valve had been fully opened, the tubing directly downstream of the valve came apart, spraying two operators with acid.
- May 15, 2014 – Los Angeles, pipeline rupture, 4 sickened
- February 18, 2015 – Torrance, refinery explosion, four injured
- May 19, 2015 – Santa Barbara – Pipeline rupture, large oil spill
- October 22, 2017 - An oil well pump fire, east of Orcutt.
- January 19, 2018 - A fire broke out in the cooling tower of a refinery in Bakersfield.
- October 8, 2018 - Nearly 1,900 gallons of crude oil leaked from a ruptured pipe over a weekend, at a Torrance Refinery.
- December 22, 2018 - Five gallons of Modified Hydrofluoric Acid leaked from a hose, as it was being transferred from a tanker truck to a container, at a Torrance refinery.
- 15 October 2025 - In the jet fuel unit of Chevron's Los Angeles El Segundo refinery a fire broke out. No injuries were reported from the explosion and fire.

== Colorado ==
- Oil spill data are available on Colorado Oil and Gas Conservation Commission Spill Analysis website
- August 2001 through 2012 – Trinidad, earthquakes up to magnitude 5.3
- February 2004 - Williams was fined $30,000 for a fire at a well in Parachute.
- February 26, 2006 – Fire at a gas compressor station, southwest of Fort Lupton
- June 25, 2012 - One worker dead, two injured at BP Pinon natural gas compressor station explosion in Bayfield
- September 11, 2012 – A malfunction and fire at a gas compressor station, in Colorado.
- May 9, 2014 – Weld County: six crude oil tankers of 100-car train derail, one leaks an estimated 6,500 gal. (of 28,000 gal. contents)
- November 13, 2014 – Weld County explosion, one dead, two injured,
- April 17, 2015 - Lightning struck a wastewater storage tank in Greeley, which ignited the vapors inside. Other storage tanks then caught fire.
- April 17, 2017 – A severed flow line, from a gas well, leads to a gas explosion in a home, killing 2 people, in Firestone, Colorado.
- May 8, 2017 – Fire broke out at a tank for a fracking well near Greeley.
- May 25, 2017 – An oil tank explosion and fire in northern Colorado killed a worker, and burned three others.
- September 20, 2017 - A fire at oil tank farm in Weld County.
- October 29, 2017 - An oil well near Berthoud, capped in 1984, began spilling drilling mud.
- December 22, 2017 - One person injured in an explosion & fire at an oil well in Weld County, Colorado.
- February 18, 2018 - A liquid spill near tanks used in oil drilling, near Erie, was more than 200 gallons.
- April 19, 2018 - A pipeline released an unknown amount of oil & gas production wastewater, near Bayfield.
- June 19, 2018 - A lightning strike caused an explosion that damaged or destroyed up to six oil tanks at a storage facility near Hudson in Weld County.

== Delaware ==
- July 17, 2001, an explosion occurred at the Motiva Enterprises refinery in Delaware City. A work crew had been repairing a catwalk above a sulfuric acid storage tank farm when a spark from their hot work ignited flammable vapors in one of the tanks. This tank had holes in its roof and shell due to corrosion. The tank collapsed, and one of the contract workers was killed; eight others were injured. A significant volume of sulfuric acid was released to the environment.
- November 5, 2005 - Two contract employees were overcome and fatally injured by nitrogen as they performed maintenance work near a 24-inch opening on the top of a reactor. One of the workers died attempting rescue.
- November 29, 2015 - An operator at the Delaware City Refining Company's (DCRC) Kellogg Alkylation Unit suffered second degree burns to his face and neck areas while performing de-inventorying activities on a vessel in preparation for the removal of a pipe spool from a connected process. This incident follows two other incidents at the same facility which occurred on August 21, and August 28, 2015.

== Florida ==
- State had active oil and or gas wells as of April 2015 but no accidents have been uncovered.

== Georgia ==
- April 7, 1972 - An explosion & fire hit a tank farm in Doraville, Georgia. Two people died in this incident.

== Idaho ==
- State had active oil and or gas wells as of April 2015 but no accidents have been uncovered.

== Illinois ==
- November 20, 2012 – Mokena, Pipe rupture, oil spill in tank farm
- March 5, 2015 – Galena, train derailment, fire, evacuations
- November 14, 2017 - A man was seriously hurt in an oil rig explosion & fire in White County, and later died from his injuries.

== Indiana ==
- In September, 1941, a nine-hour conflagration at the Whiting Standard of Indiana refinery killed one man and injured 20 others. That blaze also destroyed more than 30 oil storage tanks and half a dozen buildings with a loss estimated at $100,000.
- On August 27, 1955, a brand new hydroformer at the Whiting Standard of Indiana refinery exploded and burned. An 8-day long fire then consumed at least 45 acres of storage tanks and damaged nearby homes and businesses. In addition to a boy killed in his home, one Standard Oil workman died of a heart attack, another 40 were injured, and 1,500 evacuated.
- On Nov 23, 1957, 2 workers were killed in a Whiting Standard of Indiana refinery fire.
- On Apr 16, 1988, 16 workers were hurt in explosion at the Whiting Standard of Indiana refinery.
- On Oct 31, 1988, 3 workers were killed, and 1 seriously injured in asphalt plant explosion & fire, at the Whiting Standard of Indiana refinery.
- About March 26, 2014 – Whiting – Crude oil spill from refinery.

== Kansas ==
- June 25, 2013 - An oil tank battery located in Ft. Leavenworth was struck by lightning & burned.
- September 23, 2014 - A lightning storm caused a Russell Co. tank battery fire.
- November 12, 2014 – Sumner County, epicenter of magnitude 4.8 earthquake
- January 19, 2015 – see OK
- September 25, 2017 - Lightning causes an oil tank battery fire near Lindsborg.
- April 30, 2018 - Lightning is blamed for a pair of oil tank battery fires in Reno and Russell counties.
- June 26, 2018 - A lightning strike was blamed for an oil tank fire, southwest of Oxford.

== Kentucky ==
- January, 2005 – Carrollton, Crude oil pipeline rupture, oil spill,
- October, 2008 – Burlington, Crude oil pipeline rupture, oil spill, 80 homes evacuated
- August 2019 - Danville, natural gas pipeline rupture, fire, 1 death, 6 injured, 75 homes evacuated

== Louisiana ==
- November 30, 1980 - An oil rig contracted by Texaco accidentally drilled into the Diamond Crystal Salt Company salt mine under Lake Peigneur. Because of an incorrect or misinterpreted coordinate reference system, the 14-inch (36 cm) drill bit entered the mine, starting a chain of events that turned the lake from freshwater to salt-water, with a deep hole. All 55 employees in the mine at the time of the accident were able to escape thanks to well-planned and rehearsed evacuation drills, while the crew of the drilling rig fled the platform before it was sucked down into the new depths of the lake.
- May 10, 1984 - A contractor hit an ethane pipeline, at the Conoco refinery in Lake Charles, causing a fire. 5 workers were injured.
- October 24, 1998 - A catastrophic vessel failure and fire occurred near Pitkin, at the Temple 22-1 Common Point Separation Facility owned by Sonat Exploration Co. Four workers who were near the vessel were killed, and the facility sustained significant damage. The vessel lacked a pressure relief system and ruptured due to overpressurization during start-up, releasing flammable material which ignited.
- 2004 Taylor oil spill a low-volume on-going event, which as of 2018, was still leaking between 300 and 700 barrels of oil a day.
- April 20, 2010 – Deepwater Horizon oil spill, in the Gulf of Mexico, 11 dead
- July 22, 2013 – Offshore gas well, 44 workers evacuated
- October 8, 2015 - Three people were killed and two others were seriously wounded Thursday when a natural gas plant in Gibson, Louisiana exploded.
- November 22, 2016, - An isobutane release occurred in the sulfuric acid alkylation unit at the ExxonMobil Refinery in Baton Rouge, Louisiana which resulted in four serious injuries to workers and injured two others. The incident occurred during minor maintenance on a flammable isobutane line which failed, releasing isobutane into the unit which ignited.
- April 14, 2017 – Well blowout in Red River Parish, Louisiana.
- April 18, 2017 – One worker was killed, and, 2 others injured, by a well tank explosion, in Mansfield, Louisiana.
- October 15, 2017 - One worker was missing & presumed dead, after a drilling rig explosion & fire on Lake Pontchartrain. 7 other workers were injured.
- July 29, 2018 - A flare for an ethylene pipeline spread to the tower it was mounted on in Plaquemine.
- June 3, 2023 - Lightning caused a tank fire in Lake Charles, Louisiana.

== Maryland ==
- State had active oil and or gas wells as of April 2015 but no accidents have been uncovered.
- On October 6, 1979, LNG vapors at the Dominion Cove Point LNG facility leaked from a pump, causing an explosion leading to 1 death, 1 critical injury, and, major damage to the facility.

== Massachusetts ==
- On February 10, 1928, explosion at the Beacon Oil plant in Everett, Massachusetts killed 14.

== Michigan ==
- July 25, 2010 – Near Marshall, massive spill of dilbit (diluted bitumen) from Canada
- September 16, 2014– Benton Harbor, pipeline gas leak, 500 residents evacuated
- January 3, 2018 - An oil rig caught fire, injuring 1, in Evart.

== Mississippi ==
- June 5, 2006 – Raleigh, oil field explosion, three dead, one injured
- October 31, 2009 - Two teens were killed when an oil tank located in a clearing in the woods near one of the teens’ homes in Carnes, MS, exploded.
- June 28, 2016 -An Enterprise Gas Processing, LLC natural gas plant in Pascagoula, Mississippi exploded and burned.

== Missouri ==
- April 30, 2013 – Ripley County, crude oil spill from pipeline,
- November 29, 2013 – An explosion and fire at a natural gas compressor station, near Houstonia.

== Montana ==
- July 2, 2011 – 10 miles from Billings, pipeline spill, evacuations
- January 16, 2015 – near Glendive, pipeline rupture
- April 27, 2018 - An estimated 25,000 gallons of oil and 3,780,000 gallons of produced water, also known as brine, were released from an oil well on the Ft Peck Reservation.

== Nebraska ==
- August 8, 2018 - An oil tank battery caught on fire after being struck by lightning, in Franklin County.

== Nevada ==
- State had active oil and or gas wells as of April 2015 but no accidents have been uncovered.

== New Mexico ==
- 18,622 reported spills as of January 13, 2015 on the State of New Mexico Oil Conservation Division web site
- May 26, 1983 – Explosion and fire at a gas compressor station near Bloomfield. Two employees were severely burned.
- April 8, 2004 - Four workers were seriously injured, when highly flammable gasoline components were released and ignited, at the Giant Industries Ciniza refinery, east of Gallup.
- July 11, 2016 – Explosion in New Mexico, 36 Oil Tanks Catch Fire
- June 9, 2017 - A tank battery caught fire, 20 miles west of Hobbs.
- September 1, 2017 - An explosion in Otis caused a fire at a tank battery near Otis.

== New Jersey ==
- On Dec. 6, 1970, a series of powerful explosions and fire ripped through a portion of the Humble Oil & Refining Company facilities in Linden. Policemen and firemen at the scene reported “numerous injuries,” and three hospitals in nearby Elizabeth reported that they were treating the injured in their emergency rooms.
- On January 7, 1983, a tank farm explosion & fire killed one person, and injured 23 others.

== New York ==
List of NYC gas explosions; most are likely in distribution lines and not associated with production

- February 10, 1973 - Bloomfield, Staten Island, Gas underneath tank lining ignites and implodes LNG Tank under maintenance killing 40 workers.

=== 1979–2009 ===
- September 8, 1980 - An explosion & fire at an Albany tank farm forced nearby resident to evacuate.
- 270 Accidents in the state

=== After 2009 ===
- August 20, 2014 – Albany, crude oil spill from pipeline,
- December 16, 2017 - An accident involving a home heating oil truck sparked a huge fire on Long Island.

== North Carolina ==
- State had active oil and or gas wells as of April 2015 but no accidents have been uncovered.
- June 13, 2010 - Lightning struck a tank of gasoline at the Colonial Pipeline Company tank farm in Greensboro, and ignited a major blaze.

July 2019, A steel construction manufacturing contractor accidentally ruptured a gas tank at Prescient Co. in Durham, killing 2 people and injuring 25.

== North Dakota ==
=== 2006 through October 2014 ===
- Numerous spills, mainly western part of state, at least four injuries
- February 13, 2014 – A fracking well blew out.

=== 2015 ===
- January 6, 2015 – near Williston, large brine spill (reference to this article contains links to stories of earlier spills)
- February 18, 2018 - A fuel oil tank fire at a West Fargo tank farm.

== Ohio ==
=== Before 2014 ===
- October 20, 1944 – The Cleveland East Ohio Gas explosion: An LNG tank suffered a seam failure, leading to LNG vapors entering sewers. The vapors later exploded, causing 130 deaths, and, destroying of square mile of Cleveland, Ohio.
- December 15, 2007 – Geauga County, gas well explosion,
- September 29, 2008 – Medina county, water well pollution
- March 17 – December 24, 2011 – Youngstown, 11 earthquakes near injection wells
- September 2012 to November 2013 –Four eastern Counties, repeated drilling-slurry spills
- November 1, 2012 to January 31, 2013 – Mahoning River, Illegal dumping of fracking waste
- September 30, 2013 – Harrison County, 400 micro-earthquakes

=== 2014 ===
- Twelve accidents, earthquakes, one dead, two injured, about 1000 evacuated
- June 28, 2014 – The Eisenbarth well in Monroe County has numerous explosions and fire.
- March 10, 2014 – Poland Township, Mahoning County, earthquakes, "New Research Links Scores of Earthquakes to Fracking Wells Near a Fault in Ohio", New York Times, January 8, 2015:
- March 17, 2014 – Oak Glen Nature Preserve, Hamilton County, Crude oil pipeline rupture, oil spill "Oil spill at nature preserve "absolutely terrible"', Cincinnati Enquirer, March 19, 2014
- May 4, 2014 – Morgan County, Well leak, Seven evacuated, "Shale well leaks during drilling process, forcing evacuations in Morgan County", Columbus Dispatch, May 8, 2014
- June 28, 2014 – Monroe County, fire, one injured "Fracking fire points out failings", Columbus Dispatch, August 31, 2014
- About August 31, 2014 – near Warren, Injection wells, Earthquake, "Ohio halts injections at two wells for fracking wastewater after quake" Columbus Dispatch, September 6, 2014
- Early September, 2014 – Carroll County, Air pollution, two houses evacuated "Commissioners learn of emissions violation at Blue Racer Plant", News Leader, September 24, 2014
- October 19, 2014 – Guernsey County, explosion, one injured "Drilling worker injured in Guernsey County explosion", Akron Beacon Journal, October 27, 2014
- October 28, 2014 – Jefferson County, Well blowout, 400 families evacuated, "Most allowed back home after fracking-well blowout in eastern Ohio", Columbus Dispatch, October 30, 2014 Columbus Dispatch, October 30, 2014
- October 28, 2014 – Monroe County, pipeline fire Eastern Ohio pipeline hauling toxic mix catches fire", Columbus Dispatch, October 28, 2014
- November 12, 2014 – Noble County, Explosion, one dead "Worker killed in explosion at Noble County oil and gas facility", Columbus Dispatch, November 14, 2014
- December 13, 2014 – Monroe County, Large leak, several families evacuated

=== 2015 ===
- January 10, 2015 – Lima, Refinery explosion,
- April 3, 2015 – Vienna – Oil spill, water pollution, fish and animal kills
- July 24, 2015 –Trumbull County – Crude oil spill

=== 2016 ===
- February 1, 2016 – Crooksville, Gas leak, 500 evacuated
- March 9, 2016 – Near Barnsville, truck accident, waste water spill

=== 2017 ===
- April 2, 2017 – Wayne National Forest, Earthquake
- October 23, 2017 - Stark County Ohio “Wooster Man Dead in Stark County Gas Line Incident, The Daily Record, October 23, 2017

=== 2018 ===
- February 15, 2018 - Well pad explosion in Belmont County, Ohio

=== 2019 ===
- January 21, 2019 - A 30-inch diameter natural gas pipeline owned by Enbridge exploded in Noble County, Ohio at approximately 10:40 a.m.. The pipeline was built in the 1950s, and last inspected in the 1980s prior to the explosion. Still under investigation, corrosion is the presumed cause.

== Oklahoma ==
=== Accidents ===
- November 17, 2009 – Elk City, Crane failure.
- March 8, 2012 - Lightning caused an oil tank battery fire in southwest Oklahoma City.
- April 18, 2013 - A Lightning strike caused a tank battery fire in NE Oklahoma City.
- December 17, 2014 – Coal County, 2 dead, 3 injured
- February 16, 2016 – One person was injured in an explosion, at a Pittsburg County oil field. Fire spread to 3 other wells.
- January 22, 2018 - Five workers killed in a gas well explosion near Quinton, Oklahoma; deaths due to burns and smoke inhalation.
- May 24, 2018 - A tank battery caught fire in southwest Oklahoma City.
- July 16, 2018 - Multiple fire departments responded to a tank battery fire in Pawnee County.
- July 29, 2018 - A tank battery fire broke out north of Carrier.

=== Earthquakes ===
- The state has posted a list, giving date, location, and magnitude of induction-well-caused earthquakes.
- February 16, 2014 – Richter 3.8
- November 12, 2014 – Earthquake, see Kansas
- January 19, 2015 – Northern Oklahoma
- January 13, 2016 – A fire at a hydrofracking well in Grady County, Oklahoma.

== Oregon ==
- State had active oil and or gas wells as of April 2015 but no accidents have been uncovered.

– Major crude oil train derailment in Mosier, a small town in the Columbia gorge spilled and burst into flames June 2016. The accident was due to railway dysfunction and bad parts. As of now, groundwater contamination is found at the site impacting wildlife.

== Pennsylvania ==
- Records of violations and spills are posted on the Pennsylvania Department of Environmental Protection. Web page
- February, 2011 – Avila, explosion, 3 injured
- April 19, 2011 – Well blowout in Bradford County, Pennsylvania.
- March 28, 2012 – An explosion at a natural gas compression station in Susquehanna County.
- May 19, 2012 – Leroy Twp., Contamination from leaking gas well,
- May 15, 2013 – A fire and possible explosion, at a Susquehanna County gas compressor station.
- January 11, 2014 – Susquehanna County, Explosion, 1 injured
- February 11, 2014 – Greene County explosion, one injured, one dead. Later, the well owner, Chevron, apologized to area residents by giving out free pizza. Chevron also blocked PA DEP personnel from the site for two days after the fire.
- September 6, 2014 – Mercer County – Fire, 15 to 20 homes evacuated
- December 1, 2014 – A gauge leaking methane most likely caused an explosion and fire, in a Susquehanna County natural gas compressor station.
- December 13, 2016 – Fire at a natural gas compressor station, located outside the village of Wharton Township, Potter County, Pennsylvania.
- December 25, 2016 – A fire broke out at a gas compressor station, in Armstrong County.
- January 1, 2017 – Fire erupts at Marcellus Shale pad in Somerset Township, Washington County.
- March 9, 2017 – A fire at a Susquehanna County gas compressor station.
- November 30, 2017 - A gas well pad fire in Somerset County.
- January 4, 2018 - Three workers hurt at a gas well in Susquehanna County, Pennsylvania.
- January 23, 2018 - 5 workers hospitalized after hydrofluoric acid leak at a refinery in Trainer, Pennsylvania.
- June 21, 2019 - A propane and hydrofluoric acid leak caused a low-hanging vapor cloud, which ignited and resulted in 3 sequential explosions at a refinery in Philadelphia, Pennsylvania. The first two explosions where of vessels containing alkylate. The final explosion was the largest and was fueled by pure hydrocarbons. It sent three fragments of the containment vessel into flight. 5 workers were hospitalized.

== South Dakota ==
- State had active oil and or gas wells as of April 2015.
- August 18, 2018 - Several oil tanks caught fire at a Whiting Petroleum site near Watford City.

== Tennessee ==
- State had active oil and or gas wells as of April 2015 but no accidents have been uncovered.

== Texas ==
- October 24, 1926 - Two were killed in a tank farm fire, in Beaumont.
- December 14, 1940 - A tank farm fire I Texas City killed one person, and injured 18 others.
- May 16, 1952 - A massive tank farm fire hit a Corpus Christi terminal.
- April 11, 1965 - A gas well blew out in Parker County, causing a massive fire. Firefighter Red Adair had to be called in to control the well, which was capped on April 17.
- February 2, 1975 - A ruptured pipe connection on a gas well, near Denver City, released hydrogen sulfide (H_{2}S ). 8 people were killed while trying to evacuate their nearby home. A worker checking that well about an alarm was also killed.
- October, 1998 – During heavy rainfall, the roof and sides of a Koch 50,000 barrel (2,100,000 gallon) above-ground storage tank buckled, discharging approximate 24,700 gallons of crude oil into Marcelinas Creek, which is a tributary of the San Antonio River. The spill occurred 1 mile northwest of Falls City, Karnes County, Texas, and entered Marcelinas Creek at flood stage. The spill was generally contained about three miles downstream. The floodwaters transported the oil laterally well beyond the banks of the creek, coating vegetation in these areas with oil as the floodwaters receded. The three miles of creek and adjacent riparian corridor, consisting of mature hardwood trees and improved pasture, provide essential habitat to numerous species of fish, birds, mammals, and reptiles. It took 17 years for the terms of settlement to be reached with regulators.
- January 13, 2003, a vapor cloud fire erupted at the BLSR Operating Ltd. oilfield waste disposal facility near Rosharon, south of Houston. Two BLSR employees and one truck driver were fatally burned. Four other workers suffered serious burns, but survived.
- March 23, 2005 – The Texas City refinery explosion; 15 dead, 180 injured
- February 16, 2007, a propane fire erupted at the Valero McKee Refinery in Sunray, north of Amarillo. Three workers suffered serious burns, and the refinery was forced to shut down. The fire began following a leak in the propane deasphalting unit and spread quickly, in part because of the rapid collapse of a major pipe rack carrying flammable hydrocarbons. Some of the rack's support columns had not been fireproofed.
- April 27, 2008 - A fire broke out at a tank battery in Ward County.
- May 15, 2009 - An oil tank battery exploded, following a tank battery fire, in Lamesa.
- July 19, 2009 - A fire in the alkylation unit at CITGO's Corpus Christi refinery led to a release of hydrofluoric acid (HF). The alkylation unit makes high-octane blending components for gasoline. One worker was critically burned.
- July 28, 2009 - A tank battery caught fire near West Odessa.
- August 28, 2012 - A tank battery caught fire, near Brownwood.
- March 28, 2013 - A tank battery caught fire in Martin County.
- April 5, 2013 – West, blowout, two dead, two injured
- April 19, 2013 – Gas well blowout in Denton, Texas.
- September 17, 2013 - Tank batteries caught fire, during a lightning storm, in east Midland.
- April 30, 2014 – Loving County, explosion, 2 dead, 9 injured
- August 2014 – Methane leaked into a water well in Palo Pinto County, causing an explosion that burned 3 people. Later the methane was linked to nearby fracking operations.
- January 1, 2015 – Irving, earthquake
- May 7, 2015 - An oil tank battery caught fire, north of Whitesboro.
- May 19, 2015 – Fracking well blew out in Karnes County, Texas, spraying a toxic mix of chemicals, and forcing the evacuation of 20 families.
- August 20, 2015 – Crude oil storage fire
- October 24, 2015 - A lightning strike from a thunderstorm was being blamed for an estimated $200,000 in damage to a saltwater disposal unit west of Patricia.
- January 26, 2016 - A tank battery caught fire in Ector County.
- March 30, 2016 - An explosion & fire at a tank battery in Pecos.
- October 14, 2016 - Lightning resulted in two tank battery fires in Howard County.
- April 4, 2017 – Fire at an oil well site, in northern Howard County. One firefighter was injured.
- August 16, 2017 - A tank battery caught fire in Greenwood.
- September 25, 2017 - A tank battery caught fire after a lightning strike, about four miles south of the Canadian River, near Amarillo.
- October 17, 2017 - Two oilfield workers were injured after an oil storage tank exploded at an oilfield near Dilley.
- December 6, 2017 - A gas well blowout in Houston.
- December 27, 2017 - A fire broke out at an oil tank, in Cherokee County.
- January 3, 2018 - An oil tank fire in Madison County.
- January 24, 2018 - An explosion & fire at an oil rig injures 1, in Karnes County.
- Feb. 25, 2018 - A lightning strike caused an explosion & fire, at an oil storage facility in Gonzales County.
- April 3, 2018 - A tank battery fire caught fire from a lightning strike, in Rusk County.
- April 14, 2018 - A tank battery caught fire in Caldwell County.
- April 28, 2018 - A tank battery exploded and burned, in Reeves County.
- May 2, 2018 - Lightning caused a tank battery fire in southeast Russell County.
- May 22, 2018 - A tank battery was destroyed, after it was struck by lightning and ignited near Hallsville.
- May 29, 2018 - Lightning caused a tank battery fire northwest of Hays.
- June 8, 2018 - A tank battery fire broke out in Pecos.
- June 30, 2018 - A fire was reported at a tank battery, in Glasscock County.
- July 10, 2018 - A tank battery caught fire in Jones County.
- July 18, 2018 - An oilfield worker was killed, and another was injured, after a tank battery caught fire off of U.S. Refinery Road near Loving.
- July 23, 2018 - An oil rig caught on fire in Howard County.
- August 21, 2018 - An oil tank battery in Southeast Atascosa County caught fire.
- August 28, 2018 - A fire broke out at a Plains All American Pipeline crude storage tank east of Wichita Falls, Texas.
- March 17, 2019 - An explosion & fire hit a tank farm in Deer Park, Texas.

== Utah ==
- March 6, 1935 – Five miles south of St. George, 70 to over 100 local townspeople gathered to watch the shooting of an Arrowhead Petroleum Company's Escalante oil, well unaware of impending danger. The explosion occurred about 9:40 pm while six 10 foot long torpedoes, each loaded with nitroglycerin and TNT and hanging from the derrick, were being lowered into the well. All told, 2,500 pounds of nitroglycerin exploded and sent a shaft of fire into the night that was seen as far as 18 miles away. Ten people died, and more were injured.
- August 8, 1993- A contract welder was killed in a flash fire at a Flying J refinery in North Salt Lake City. A pipe near where the welder was working was mistakenly filled with flammable hydrocarbons which were ignited by the welding arc. The refinery was later fined for the incident.
- January 14, 2005 - A pipe at the Silver Eagle Refinery in Woods Cross failed, expelling hydrogen and diesel fuel, that caused 30- to 40-foot flames.
- January 12, 2009 - 2 refinery operators and 2 contractors suffered serious burns resulting from a flash fire at the Silver Eagle Refinery in Woods Cross. The accident occurred when a large flammable vapor cloud was released from an atmospheric storage tank, known as tank 105, which contained an estimated 440,000 gallons of light naphtha. The vapor cloud found an ignition source and the ensuing flash fire spread up to 230 feet west of the tank farm.
- November 4, 2009, a second accident occurred at the Silver Eagle Refinery in Woods Cross, when a powerful blast wave caused by the failure of a 10-inch pipe damaged nearby homes.
- June 10, 2012 – The Red Butte Creek oil spill in Salt Lake City caused significant pollution.
- November 21, 2012 - Two men who suffered burns when a natural gas compressor station exploded in Dry Canyon.
- January 22, 2013 – A natural gas well fire, in Roosevelt, Utah forces evacuations.
- January 19, 2018 - A double tanker vehicle hauling gasoline exploded & burned on I-15 in Midvale UT.
- July 28, 2018 - Two men were "badly burned" and suffered "significant injuries", as a result of an explosion at a natural gas collection facility near Cisco, Utah.

== Virginia ==
- June 26, 1975 - An explosion & fire occurred at a tank farm in Richmond.
- April 9, 2014 – Lynchburg, Train derailment, explosion, fire, 300 people evacuated, oil spill

== Washington ==
- June 10, 1999 - The Olympic pipeline explosion.
- April 2, 2010 - An explosion and fire led to the fatal injury of seven employees when a nearly forty-year-old heat exchanger catastrophically failed during a maintenance operation to switch a process stream between two parallel banks of exchangers at the Tesoro refinery in Anacortes.
- March 31, 2014 - A large explosion rocked a natural gas processing plant on the Washington-Oregon border, injuring five workers, causing about 400 people to evacuate from nearby farms and homes, and emitting a mushroom cloud of black smoke that was visible for more than a mile. The blast at the Williams Northwest Pipeline facility near the Washington town of Plymouth, along the Columbia River, sparked a fire and punctured one of the facility's two giant storage tanks for liquefied natural gas.

== West Virginia ==
- List of spills is posted on West Virginia Department of Environmental Protection database. Company name is needed to search database.
- June 7, 2010 through January 26, 2015 – Ohio River Valley, Numerous accidents, 2 dead, 7 injured, about 1000 evacuated
- September 9, 2010 – Explosion and a fire that burned for 9 days, in Wetzel County.
- February 5, 2012 – Taylor County, Explosion, One dead
- April 11, 2013 – 2 workers died from injuries sustained in an explosion at a natural gas operation, in Tyler County
- July 7, 2013 – Dodridge County, Well fire, Five injured,
- February 16, 2015 – Mount Carbon – derailment, one injured, 85 evacuated
- May 25, 2018 - A storage tank exploded at a well site, killing one, and injuring 3 others, in Doddridge County.
- June 7, 2018 - Seven people were injured in an explosion, at a two-day-old gas well that had recently started drilling to the deep Marcellus shale formation, in Moundsville.
- December 8, 2020 - An explosion occurred at a Chemours plant in Belle, West Virginia. A plant worker was killed and 3 other people were injured.

== Wisconsin ==
- July 29, 2012 – Pipeline oil spill, one evacuation

== Wyoming ==
- August 2006 – A fracking well blowout near Clark forced many in 25 nearby homes to evacuate.
- December 6, 2011 – An explosion at a Falcon natural gas compressor station, south of Pinedale.
- September 24, 2012 – Well blowout
- December 25, 2013 – An explosion, and flash fire, at a Legacy Resources Natural Gas Compressor Station, injured one man, near Riverton.
- April 23, 2014 - There was an explosion followed by a fire, at the Williams Gas Plant near Opal, Wyo. The entire town of Opal was evacuated after 4 p.m., according to the natural gas company Williams.
- September 23, 2014 - 4 men had severe burns from an explosion at a gas plant pumping station, near Opal, Wyoming. One man died later on.
- March 16, 2018 - Several oil storage tanks were involved in a fire, in southern Campbell County.
- Threats and the safety standards of American oil & gas industry
