= Fort Nikolaevskaia =

Coordinates: 60°33′8″N 151°15′30″W

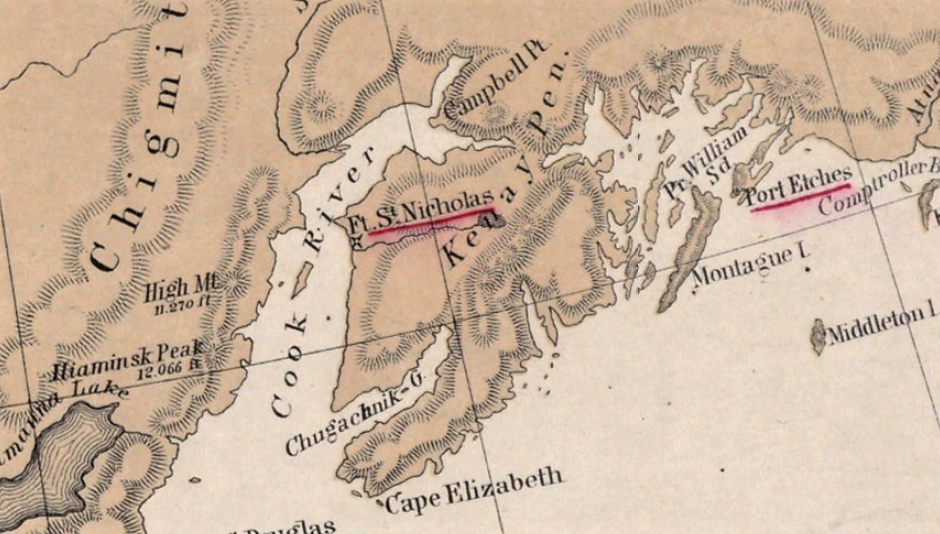
'Ft. St. Nicholas', as shown on an 1867 map of Alaska

Fort Nikolaevskaia (Russian: Форт Николаевская) or Fort St. Nicholas (Russian: Форт Николас), also called Nikolaevskii Redoubt, was a fur trading post founded by the Lebedev-Lastochkin Company (LLC) in Alaska, the first European settlement on the Alaskan mainland. It is located on the site of modern Kenai. It was one of several posts maintained by the company on Cook Inlet. With the creation of a monopoly in Russian America around the Russian-American Company in 1799, the station continued operations until the Alaska Purchase.

== Foundation ==
A LLC galiot under the command of Pytor Zaikov, the Sv. Pavel, sailed to Three Saints Bay on Kodiak Island in 1786. The trade post was then center of Shelikhov-Golikov Company (SGC) operations, a competing Russian fur company. The crew wintered at the station despite orders given to NEC managers by Grigory Shelikhov to remove, "by force if necessary", competing Russian merchants located near company posts. Zaikov conferred with Evstratii Delarov about locating a suitable area to establish a trade post. Delarov recommended that the LLC employees make their station on Cook Inlet, where his own company had previously "pacified the inhabitants." Sv. Pavel entered Cook Inlet on 1 June 1787 and sailed 15 miles past the NEC Fort Alexander to the entrance of the Kenai River where Fort Nikolaevskaia was established. Above the stockade "a crude wooden carving of the imperial arms" was posted. The sea otters of the inlet were quickly hunted close to extermination by the rival Russian companies. SGC employees began sending recommendations to Aleksandr Baranov to close the SGC trade posts he managed.

While leading the Vancouver Expedition, George Vancouver sailed to Fort Nikolaevskaia on 10 May 1794. The British captain recorded there were about 25 buildings within the stockade. Besides the residency of the commanding officer, there 23 dwellings "of different dimensions all huddled together without any kind of regularity..." inhabited by primarily Dena'ina laborers or relatives. Vancouver went on to describe the trading post as comprising

a space of about an hundred yards square, fenced in by a very stout paling of small spars of pine and birch, placed close together about twelve feet high. They were fixed firm in the ground, yet they appeared to be a very defenseless barricade against any hostile attempts, even of the Indians, as the whole might easily be reduced to ashes by fire on the outside, as could also their houses within the fence, those being built with wood and covered in with thatch. The largest of these, resembling in its shape a barn, was about thirty-five yards long, about as many feet in breadth, and about ten or twelve feet high; this was appropriated to the residence of thirty-six Russians... all of whom but the commander reside in this house

== Operations ==
Fort Nikoleavskaia quickly became the center of LLC trapping operations on Cook Inlet. After overseeing activities for two years, Zaikov and a crew set sail for Okhotsk on 15 July 1789. The furs carried by Sv. Pavel were valued at over ₽100,000. Fort Nikolaevskaia then had a staff of 38 Russians, Dena'inas and Itelmens, with Pytor Kolomin overseeing operations. Provisions dwindled as the staff waited two years for a supply ship to arrive. Coastal Alaskan Natives in general "were outstanding hunters of marine mammals", and used as laborers by the various Russian fur trading companies. The LLC staff were the most notorious in dealings with the Aleutian and Dena'ina peoples, as the Russians "exploited them, underpaying them for furs and for labor as hunters and servants and even enslaving them." While waiting for supplies, relations with neighboring Dena'ina soured with skirmishes and raids killing seven LLC employees.

Reinforcements and provisions arrived on the Sv. Georgii in August 1791, commanded by Grigorii Konovlov. Konovlov and his 63 LLC employees some forced Kolomin and his complement from the company post. Acting as an "unprincipled bully" who "robbed his rival, plundered and outraged the natives, and, eventually, threatened the trading-posts and shipyard of the Shelikof Company". Konovlov created a plethora of disputes in the area. During the winter of 1791 attacks by the Dena'ina heightened on Nikoleavskaia and other Russian posts on Cook Inlet, due to the destruction of traditional food sources utilised by Dena'ina. When Zaikov returned in 1792 aboard Sv. Ioann Bogoslov, Grigorii Konovalov and several of his staff were imprisoned. They were deported to Okhotsk on the LLC ship Sv. Michael.

Zaikov continued to manage the trade post until its closure in 1798. During the spring of that year, the continued heavy handed tactics of LLC merchants led an armed resistance. Dena'inas destroyed LLC artels at Old Iliamna and Tyonek, killing over a hundred native laborers and 21 Russians. Nikoleavskaia was soon put under siege, though a militia of Russians sent by their Kodiak based competitors, the United American Company, broke off the attacks. The Sv. Ioann Bogoslov was made sea worthy and set sail with 60 Russian LLC employees under Zaikov. Nikoleavskaia was used as base of trapping operations on Cook Inlet until the Alaska Purchase, first by the UAC and later the Russian-American Company monopoly.
