= Cook Inletkeeper =

Water conservation and ecology organization

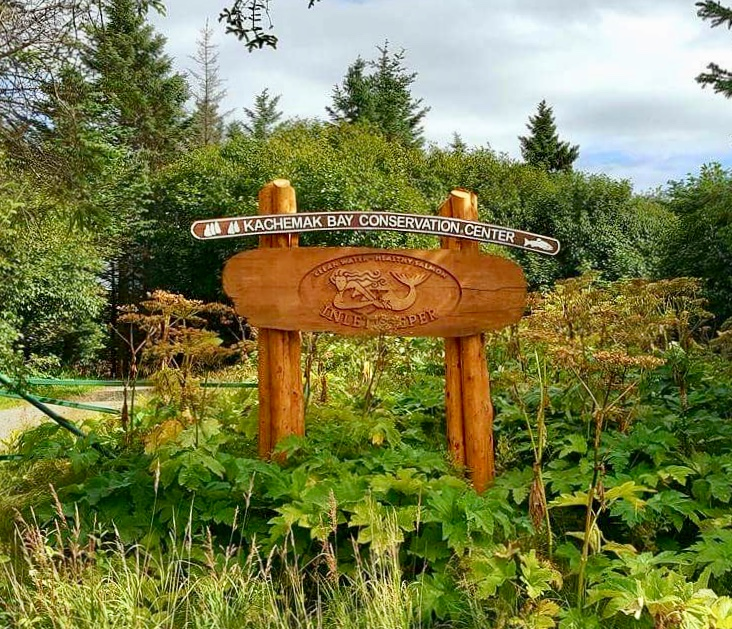
- Headquarters sign, Homer
- Formation: 1994; 32 years ago
- Type: Nonprofit
- Tax ID no.: 92-0156450
- Legal status: 501(c)(3)
- Headquarters: Homer, Alaska
- Board President: Willow King
- Science & Executive Director: Sue Mauger
- Website: https://inletkeeper.org/

Cook Inletkeeper is a non-profit water conservation and ecology organization based in Homer, Alaska. Their stated goal is "promoting sound public policies that protect fish habitat and water quality; and holding individuals, industry and agencies accountable for habitat, water quality and human health in the Cook Inlet watershed. " The organization was founded in 1994 with funds from a legal settlement involving oil companies that extracted resources from Cook Inlet. They are part of the Waterkeeper Alliance. They were involved in pressuring the National Marine Fisheries Service to list the Cook Inlet population of beluga whales as endangered. They have also been active in opposing open-pit mining in the Cook Inlet area. They also manage a water quality laboratory in Homer that monitors 240 sites around Cook Inlet. In 2005, Robert F. Kennedy Jr. spoke in support of their efforts at the group's ten-year anniversary celebration. He stated that "The fish in that inlet belongs to the people. Everybody has a right to use them. Nobody has a right to use them in a way that will diminish or injure their use and enjoyment by others."
