= Beluga, Alaska =

- Census-designated place
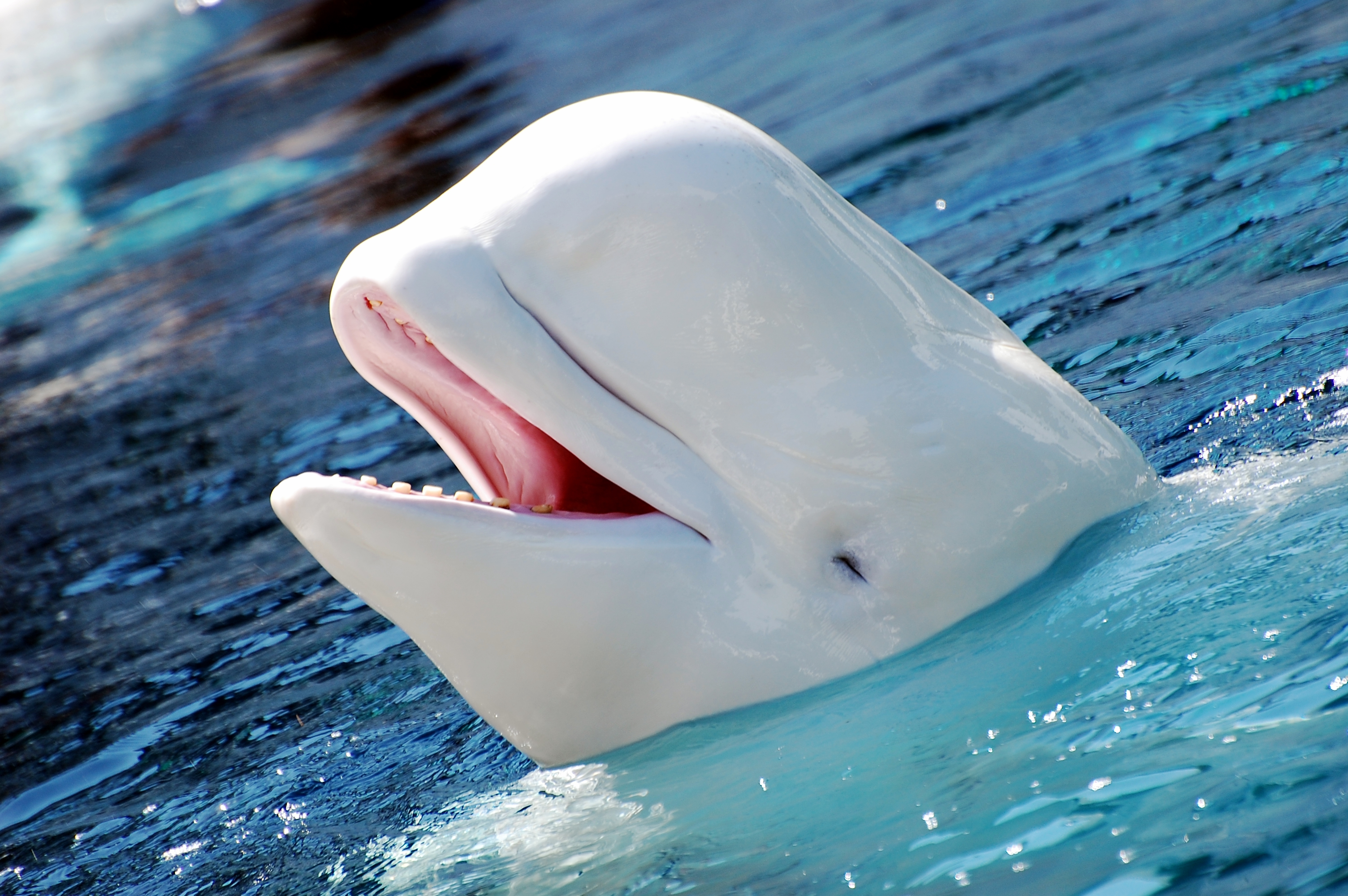
- Beluga Whale, for which the village and river were named for

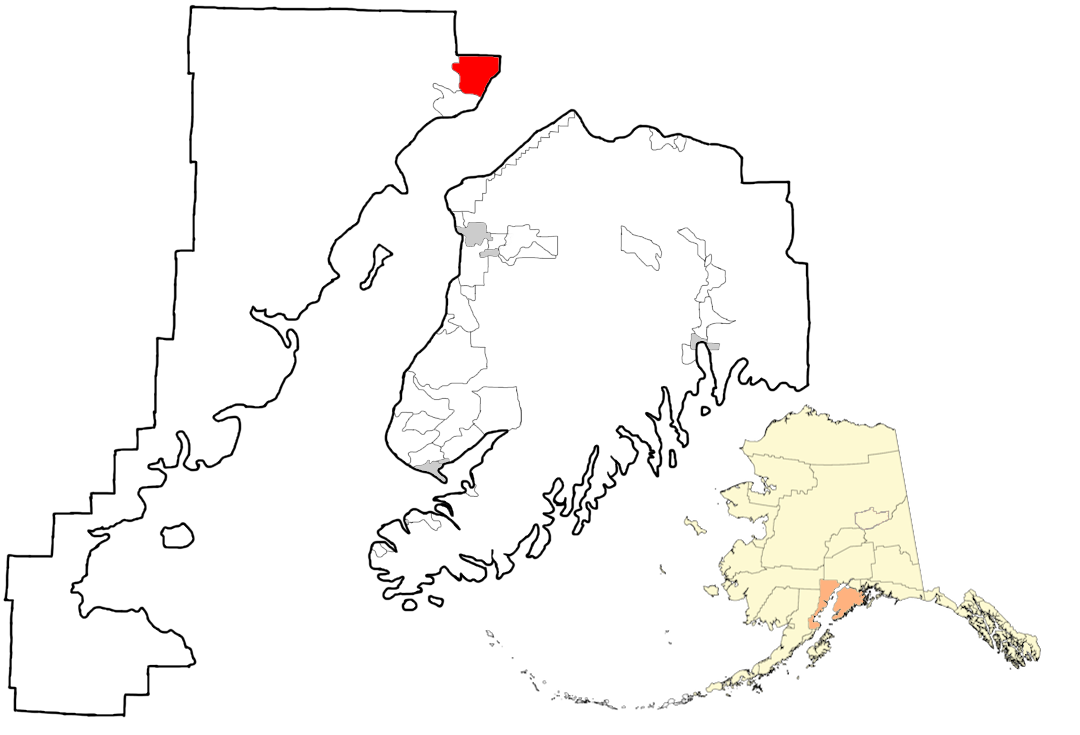
- Location in Kenai Peninsula Borough, Alaska
- Coordinates: 61°8′2″N 151°9′53″W
- Country: United States
- State: Alaska
- Borough: Kenai Peninsula

Government
  - Borough mayor: Peter Micciche
  - State senator: Lyman Hoffman (D)
  - State rep.: Bryce Edgmon (I)

Area
  - Total: 99.84 sq mi (258.58 km^{2})
  - Land: 99.13 sq mi (256.74 km^{2})
  - Water: 0.71 sq mi (1.84 km^{2})
- Elevation: 112 ft (34 m)

Population (2020)
  - Total: 34
  - Density: 0.34/sq mi (0.13/km^{2})
- Time zone: UTC-9 (Alaska (AKST))
  - Summer (DST): UTC-8 (AKDT)
- ZIP code: 99695
- Area code: 907
- FIPS code: 02-06245
- GNIS feature ID: 1865548

Beluga is a census-designated place (CDP) in Kenai Peninsula Borough, Alaska, United States. As of the 2020 census, Beluga had a population of 34.

== Geography ==
Beluga is located in the northern part of Kenai Peninsula Borough at 61°8′2″N 151°9′53″W (61.133962, -151.164741), on the northwest side of Cook Inlet. The community is on the Alaskan mainland rather than the Kenai Peninsula proper. It is bordered to the north by Matanuska-Susitna Borough and to the south by the Tyonek CDP. Access is by air or by water, as the road network is local only.

According to the United States Census Bureau, the CDP has a total area of 100.8 square miles (261.1 km^{2}), of which 100.1 square miles (259.2 km^{2}) are land and 0.73 square miles (1.9 km^{2}), or 0.72%, are water. The southern border of the CDP is the Chuitna River, and the Beluga River flows through the northern part of the CDP.

== Demographics ==
Historical population
Census	Pop.	Note	%±
2000	32		—
2010	20		−37.5%
2020	34		70.0%
U.S. Decennial Census

Beluga first appeared on the 2000 U.S. Census as a census-designated place (CDP).

As of the census of 2000, there were 32 people, 13 households, and 7 families residing in the CDP. The population density was 0.3 inhabitants per square mile (0.12/km^{2}). There were 54 housing units at an average density of 0.5 per square mile (0.19/km^{2}). The racial makeup of the CDP was 75.00% White and 25.00% Native American.

There were 13 households, out of which 38.5% had children under the age of 18 living with them, 61.5% were married couples living together, and 38.5% were non-families. 23.1% of all households were made up of individuals, and none had someone living alone who was 65 years of age or older. The average household size was 2.46 and the average family size was 3.00.

In the CDP, the population was spread out, with 25.0% under the age of 18, 31.3% from 25 to 44, 34.4% from 45 to 64, and 9.4% who were 65 years of age or older. The median age was 42 years. For every 100 females, there were 128.6 males. For every 100 females age 18 and over, there were 140.0 males.

The median income for a household in the CDP was $0, and the median income for a family was $0. Males had a median income of $0 versus $0 for females. The per capita income for the CDP was $0. There were no families and none of the population living below the poverty line, including no under eighteens and none of those over 64.

Two prominent features are a small general store and the Chugach Electric power plant, which powers about half of Anchorage. The plant is situated on a gas reserve, which allows for on-site extraction of the gas to be used to fuel the plant.

== Fishing ==
There are three main fishing rivers: the Beluga in the north (king salmon, silver salmon, and sockeye salmon), the Chuitna in the south (king salmon and silver salmon), and Three Mile Creek in the middle (silver salmon). Two other rivers, the Theodore and the Lewis (both with king salmon and silver salmon), are a short distance northeast of the CDP. There are countless freshwater lakes in the Beluga area. A record pike caught in one was 49 inches (1,200 mm) and was caught using ice fishing gear.

Many set net fishers also fish from shore commercially to make a living. A good catch is about 100 salmon.
