= Cook Inlet =

Inlet from the Gulf of Alaska

- Tikahtnu, Cungaaciq
- Tikahtnu (Denaʼina); Cungaaciq (Alutiiq)
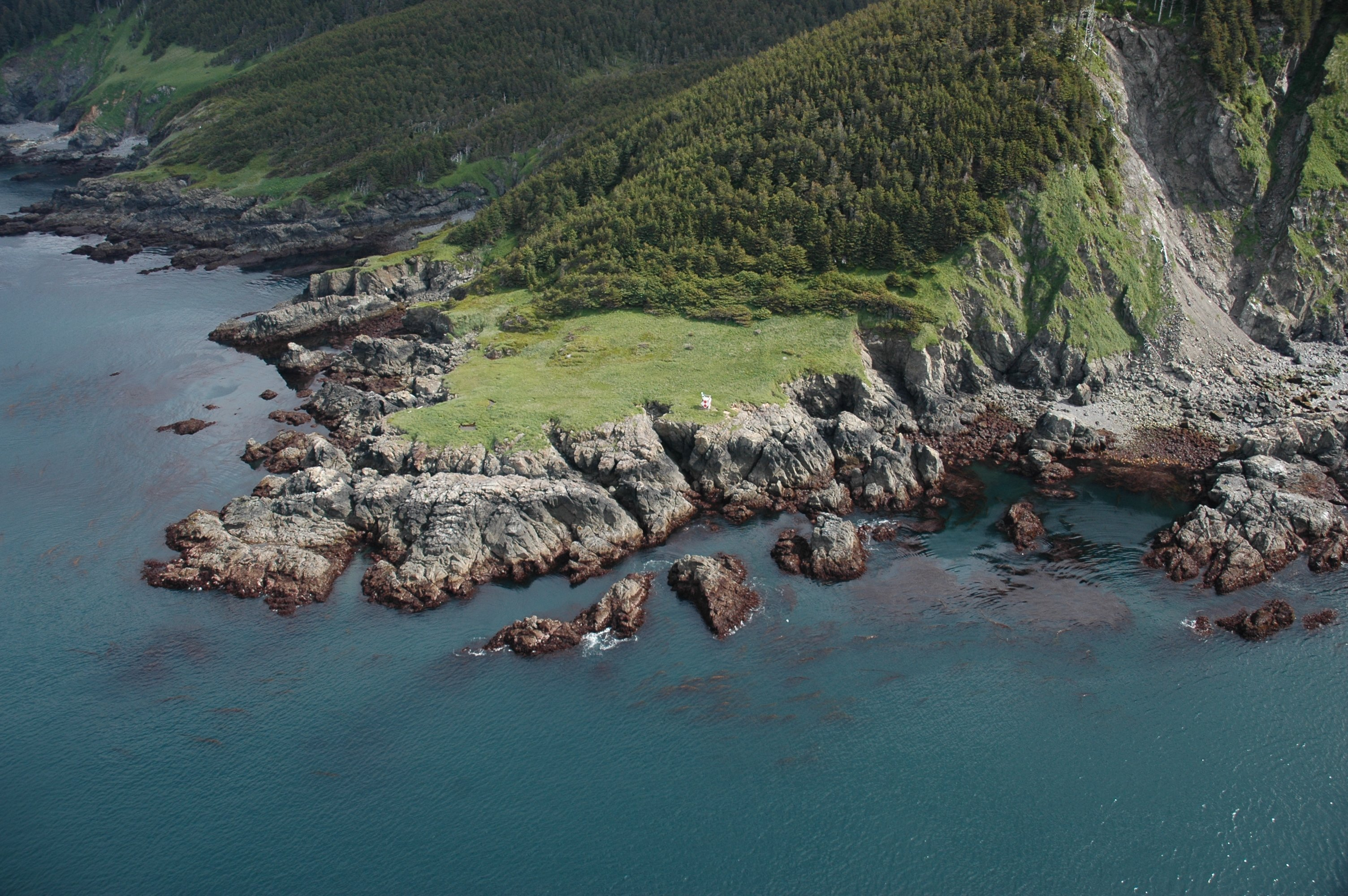
- The navigational light at the southwestern tip of Elizabeth Island demarcates the boundary between Cook Inlet and the Gulf of Alaska

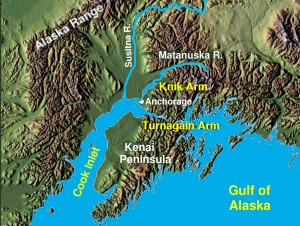
- Location: South-central Alaska
- Coordinates: 60°20′16″N 151°52′30″W
- River sources: Knik River, Little Susitna River, Susitna River, Matanuska River
- Max. length: 180 miles (290 km)
- Surface area: 100,000 km^{2} (39,000 sq mi)

Cook Inlet (Denaʼina: Tikahtnu; Sugpiaq: Cungaaciq) stretches 180 miles (290 km) from the Gulf of Alaska to Anchorage in south-central Alaska. Cook Inlet branches into the Knik Arm and Turnagain Arm at its northern end, almost surrounding Anchorage. On its southern end, it merges with the Shelikof Strait, Stevenson Entrance, Kennedy Entrance and Chugach Passage.

The Cook Inlet and both its arms are bodies of brackish water, containing a turbid mix of ocean salt-water and freshwater runoff from the various rivers and streams. The narrow channel of the inlet funnels the tides creating very fast-moving currents, rip tides, and occasional bore tides. Cook Inlet watershed is the most populated watershed in Alaska. The watershed covers about 100,000 km^{2} (39,000 sq mi) of southern Alaska, east of the Aleutian Range, south and east of the Alaska Range, receiving water from its tributaries, which include the Knik River, the Little Susitna River, the Susitna and Matanuska rivers, Eagle River, Ship Creek, Resurrection Creek, Portage Creek, Kenai River, and many others. The watershed includes the drainage areas of Denali and is the collection point for the runoff from many surrounding glaciers, leading to the high turbidity and large silt deposits. Within the watershed there are several national parks and the active volcano Mount Redoubt, along with three other historically active volcanoes. Cook Inlet provides navigable access to the port of Anchorage at the northern end, and to the smaller Homer port further south. Before the growth of Anchorage, Knik was the destination for most marine traffic in upper Cook Inlet. Approximately 400,000 people live within the Cook Inlet watershed.

== Geography ==
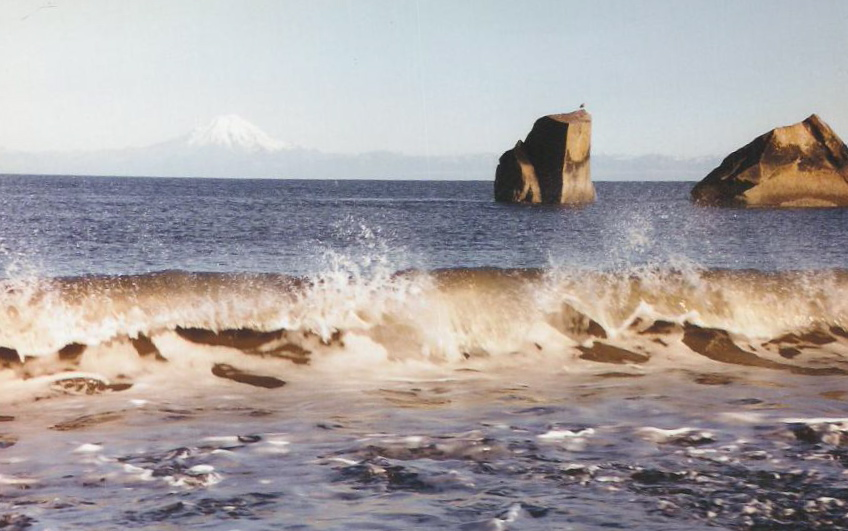
Cook Inlet seen from Clam Gulch

Cook inlet, along with the Kenai Peninsula, the Kenai Mountains, the Chugach Mountains, and Kodiak Island, formed approximately 65 million years ago, just after the extinction of the dinosaurs. Like most of Alaska's mountains, they consist mainly of sedimentary rock and metamorphic rock that were deposited on the ocean floor during the Cretaceous period. This area, where a corner of the Pacific Plate subducts under the North American Plate, uplifted the ocean floor and compressed it, causing the crust to thicken and scrunch. Tectonic forces lifted the mountains and peninsula out of the water, forming a valley that was cut off from the ocean to the north and the west. The rest of Alaska's mountains were formed in the same manner, in cyclic events, and the mountain ranges become progressively older the further north they lie. Thus, the Cook Inlet and its surrounding land masses are rather young compared to those of the Alaska Range, which formed around 126 million years ago, or the Brooks Range which formed around 256 million years ago. The valley left by this continental compaction remains open to the Gulf of Alaska to the south, forming the inlet as it exists today. The surrounding mountains were host the large ice sheets and glaciers during the Pleistocene epoch (the Ice Ages, around 2 million to 11,000 years ago) which scoured the land and formed vast plains and moraines surrounding much of the upper inlet from glacial till that was deposited.

Cook Inlet exists in a subsidence zone which contains many faults, and is frequently prone to earthquake activity. The primary fault, the Aleutian Fault, is found in the nearby Aleutian Trench in the Gulf of Alaska, where a corner of the Pacific Plate is forced underneath Alaska at a 45-degree angle. Thus, most of the uplift force occurs along a line from Kodiak Island and up the Kenai Mountains to the Chugach Mountains. The inlet lies in a region where the crust is wrinkled under this force and the tectonic forces push the ground downward. In 1964, the 1964 Alaska earthquake, a megathrust earthquake, occurred when over 600 miles of the Aleutian fault ruptured, uplifting the Kenai Mountains 60 feet (20 meters) in under 5 minutes. With a magnitude of 9.2, the earthquake was the fourth largest ever recorded. It devastated Anchorage where much of downtown dropped several stories, and the mountains surrounding the Turnagain Arm subsided 8 feet (2.4 meters), submerging the towns of Portage and Girdwood, as well as long stretches of the Seward Highway.

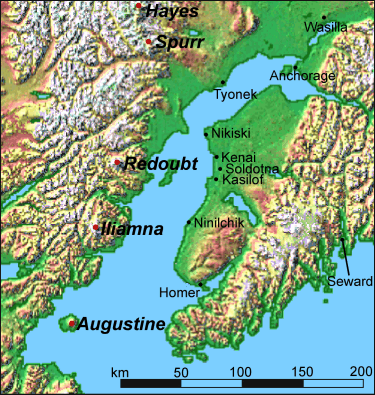
Locations of volcanoes near Cook Inlet

Because it lies along a subduction zone, the Cook Inlet region contains active volcanoes, including Augustine Volcano and Mount Redoubt, and is part of the Pacific Ring of Fire. Hot magma and steam from the subducting ocean floor build up within these volcanoes, which tend to erupt in fairly regular cycles with very explosive force, often spewing volcanic ash tens of thousands of feet (several kilometers) high. Volcanic eruptions in the region have been associated with earthquakes and tsunamis, and debris avalanches have resulted in tsunamis also. There was an earthquake of the magnitude of 7.1 on December 31, 1901 generated by an eruption that caused several tsunamis. In 2009 a lahar from Mt. Redoubt threatened the Drift River oil terminal.

Cook Inlet has the fourth largest tidal range in the world. The shape of the inlet and its orientation with respect to the lunar orbit causes the tide to come in and go out very rapidly. As the inlet narrows, the speed of the water increases, creating very powerful currents with speeds of up to 6 knots (7 miles per hour). While lined with large areas of silt and mudflats, the central and upper inlet is filled with narrow troughs that may be 150 to 300 feet (50 to 100 meters) deep. These, along with the tides, provide a challenge to ships navigating through the waters. The strong tides create powerful rip tides and bore tides which are sometimes among the largest in the world. Tidal bores occur within the inlet, and especially Turnagain Arm, almost daily, but are usually too small to notice. Large bores tend to occur after extreme tidal lows, appearing as a wall of water sometimes over 10 feet high as the tide comes in all at once. Large bores are less frequent, and are typically formed during a new or full moon, especially when the moon is at perigee. Unlike areas around the Bering Sea where weather is largely affected by sea ice, the waters of the inlet are warmed by the Alaska Current in the Gulf of Alaska, part of the North-Pacific Subpolar Gyre, which affects the climate and keeps the temperatures in the Cook Inlet region fairly moderate compared to the extremes found in other parts of the state.

== History ==
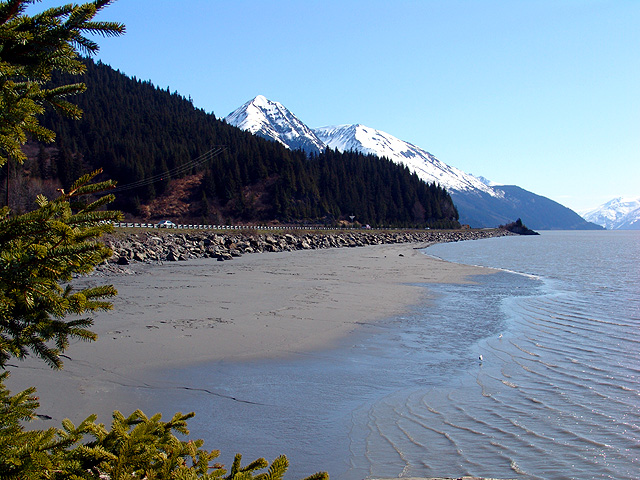
Turnagain Arm

The inlet was first explored and settled by Alutiiq people, tribes of coastal-dwelling Pacific Eskimos, beginning around 6000 years ago. The Chugach arrived around the first century and were the last of the Alutiiq people to settle in the area, but abandoned it after tribes of Dena'ina people, an Athabaskan people from the interior of the state, arrived sometime between 500 and 1600 AD. In the 18th century, Russian fur hunters (promyshlenniki) were among the first European visitors. The Lebedev Lastochkin Company leader Stepan Zaikov established a post at the mouth of the Kenai River, Fort Nikolaevskaia, in 1786. These fur trappers used Siberian Native and Alaska Native people, particularly Aleuts from the Aleutian Islands and Koniag natives from Kodiak, to hunt for sea otters and other marine mammal species for trade with China via Russia's then-exclusive inland port of trade at Kiakhta.

Other Europeans to visit Cook Inlet include the 1778 expedition of James Cook, its namesake, who sailed into it while searching for the Northwest Passage. Cook received maps of Alaska, the Aleutians, and Kamchatka during a visit with Russian fur trader Gerasim Izmailov in Unalaska, and combined these maps with those of his expedition to create the first Mercator projection of the North Pacific. The inlet was named after Cook in 1794 by George Vancouver, who had served under Cook in 1778. Turnagain Arm was named by Cook, "turnagain" being a moniker he had used before, at his annoyance at having to turn around after exploring another dead end.

Upon reaching the head of Cook Inlet, Cook was of the opinion that both Knik Arm and Turnagain Arm were the mouths of rivers and not the opening to the Northwest Passage. Under orders by the British Crown to ignore any such rivers and inlets, he had initially planned to pass it by, but at the insistence of John Gore and many others of his crew, he reluctantly agreed to explore the area. Cook anchored at Ship Creek and encountered the local Natives for the first time when two men approached in kayaks, invited them to come ashore. Under Cook's orders, William Bligh, of HMS Bounty fame, organized a party to travel up Knik Arm. Bligh served as Cook's Sailing Master on this, his 3rd and final voyage, the aim of which was discovery of the Northwest Passage. After meeting with some local Dena'ina, Bligh returned to report Knik Arm indeed led only to a couple of rivers.

Cook sailed up Turnagain Arm in his ship, HMS Resolution, finding it impossible to navigate against the strong currents and mudflats, and got stuck on a sandbar when he tried to get back out, having to wait for the tide to come in and free his ship. He never actually confirmed it led to a river, which led to a decade of massive speculation until George Vancouver returned to finish the map. Having been in a bad mood since first agreeing to explore the area, and as a result of this frustration, the second body of water was given the disingenuous name "Turn Again". Early maps label Turnagain Arm as the "Turnagain River".

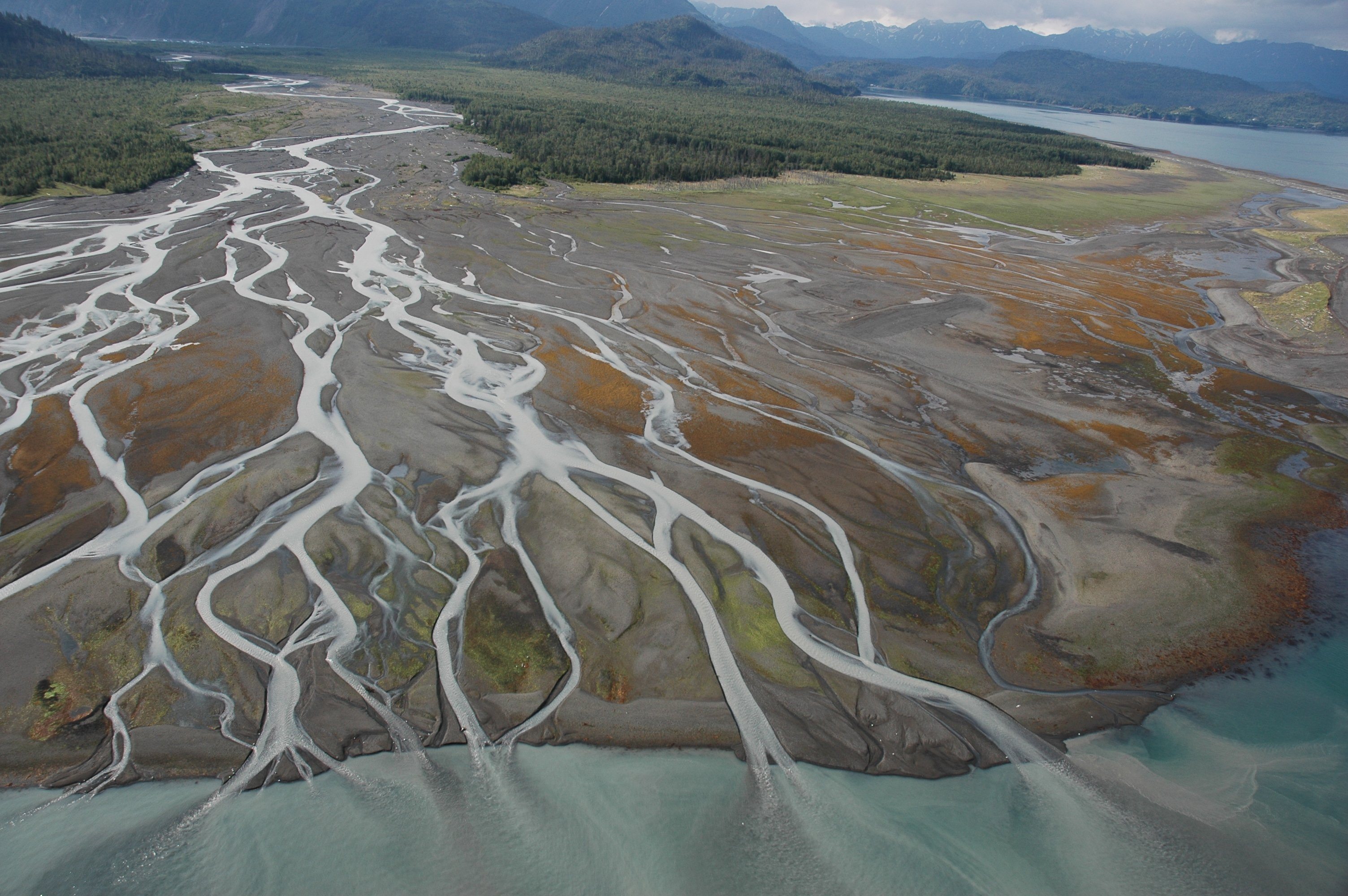
Fox River delta at low tide in Kachemak Bay

The SS Farallon was a wooden Alaskan Steamship Company liner that struck Black Reef in the Cook Inlet on January 5, 1910. All thirty-eight men on board survived, and were rescued twenty-nine days later. Few white people visited upper Cook Inlet until construction of the Alaska Railroad along the eastern shores of Turnagain Arm and Knik Arm of Cook Inlet around 1915. The natives of the Eklutna village are the descendants of the residents of eight native villages around upper Cook Inlet.

During the 1964 Alaska earthquake, areas around the head of Turnagain Arm near Girdwood and Portage dropped as much as 8 feet (2.4 m) by subsidence and subsequent tidal action. Both hamlets were destroyed. Girdwood was later relocated inland and Portage was abandoned. About 20 miles (32 km) of the Seward Highway sank below the high-water mark of Turnagain Arm; the highway and its bridges were raised and rebuilt in 1964–66.

== Communities ==
Most of Alaska's population is in the Cook Inlet area, with highest concentration in Anchorage. Along the East side of the Cook Inlet, the Kenai Peninsula is host to many smaller fishing communities, such as Kenai, Soldotna, Ninilchick, Anchor Point and Homer. Many residents of the Kenai rely on income generated from fisheries in the Cook Inlet. The west side of the Inlet is not connected to any major road systems and is typically accessed by boat or plane, including the village of Tyonek, Alaska, some oil camps, and many seasonal fishing camps.

== Resources ==
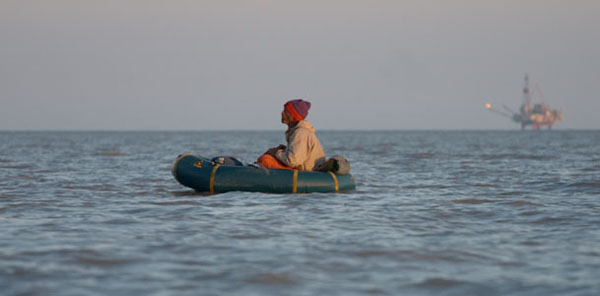
Oil Rig and Packraft on Cook Inlet

The Cook Inlet Basin contains large oil and gas deposits including several offshore fields. As of 2005 there were 16 platforms in Cook Inlet, the oldest of which is the XTO A platform first installed by Shell in 1964, and newest of which is the Osprey platform installed by Forest Oil in 2000. Most of the platforms are operated by Union Oil, which was acquired by Chevron in 2005. There are also numerous oil and gas pipelines running around and under the Cook Inlet. The main destinations of the gas pipelines are to Kenai where the gas is primarily used to fuel commercial fertilizer production and a liquified natural gas (LNG) plant and to Anchorage where the gas is consumed largely for domestic uses.

Alaska has approximately half the known coal reserves in the U.S. For decades, there has been a proposal to build a large coal mine (the Chuitna Coal Mine) on the west side of Cook Inlet near the Chuitna River, and the native village of Tyonek, Alaska. American Rivers placed the Chuitna River on its list of America's Ten Most Endangered Rivers of 2007, based on the threat of this mine.

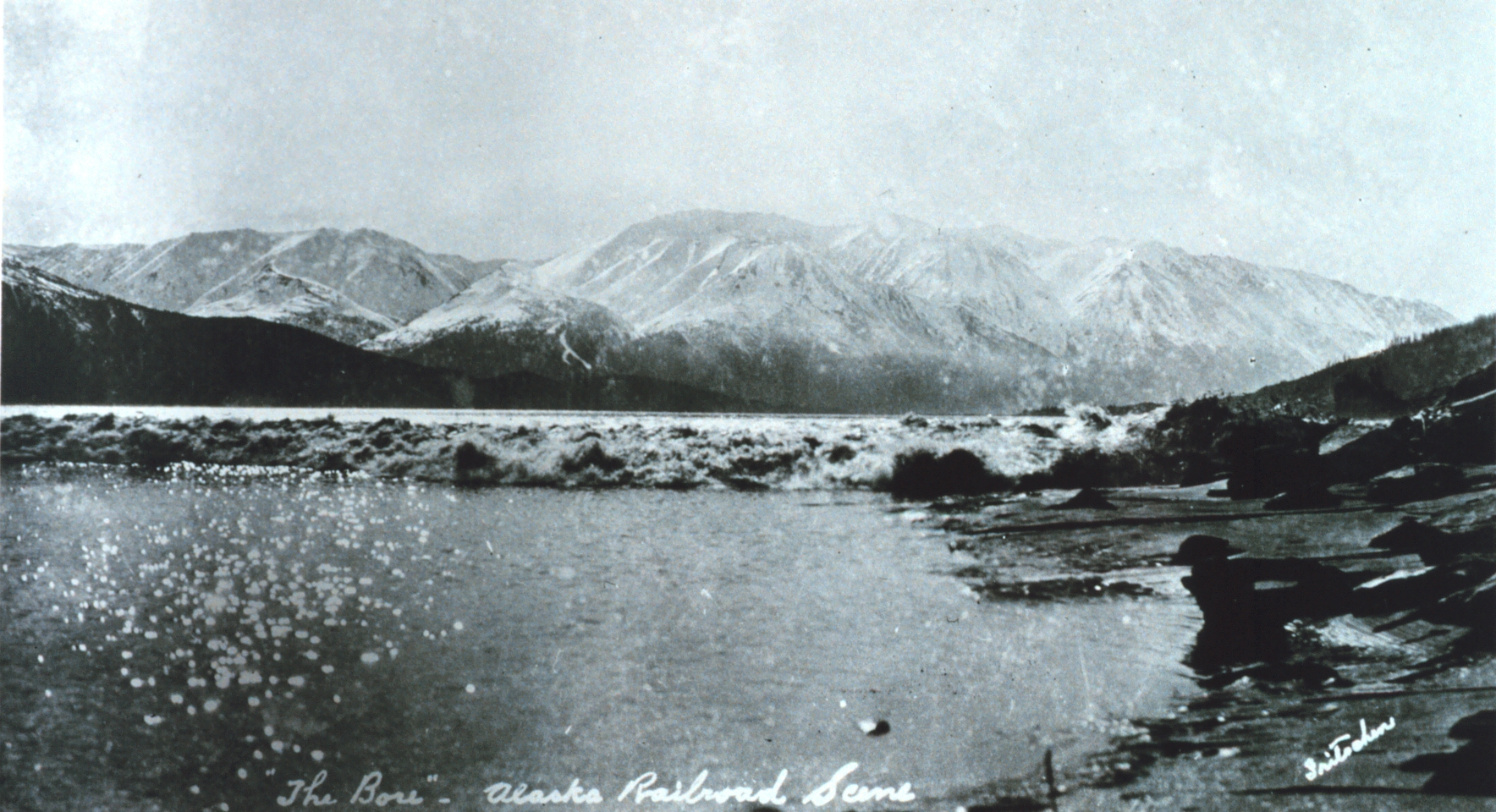
The bore appears as a wall of turbulent water

Turnagain Arm is one of only about 60 bodies of water worldwide to exhibit a tidal bore. The bore may be more than six feet (1.8 m) high and travel at 15 miles per hour (24 km/h) on high spring tides and opposing winds. Turnagain Arm sees the largest tidal range in United States, with a mean of 30 feet (9.1 m), and the fourth highest in the world, behind Bay of Fundy (38 ft, 11.7 m), Ungava Bay (32 ft 0 in, 9.75 m), and Bristol Channel (31 ft, 9.6 m). The ocean's natural 12-hour 25-minute tidal cycle is close to Turnagain Arm's natural resonance frequency, which then reinforces the tide similar to water sloshing in a bathtub. Tidal fluctuations in the main body of Cook Inlet, while not as extreme as the shallow and narrow Turnagain Arm, regularly reach 25 feet (7.6 m) or more and exhibit currents in excess of 5 knots (9.3 km/h; 5.8 mph) at full tidal flow. The inlet and its arms have been proposed as a potentially attractive site for the generation of tidal power.

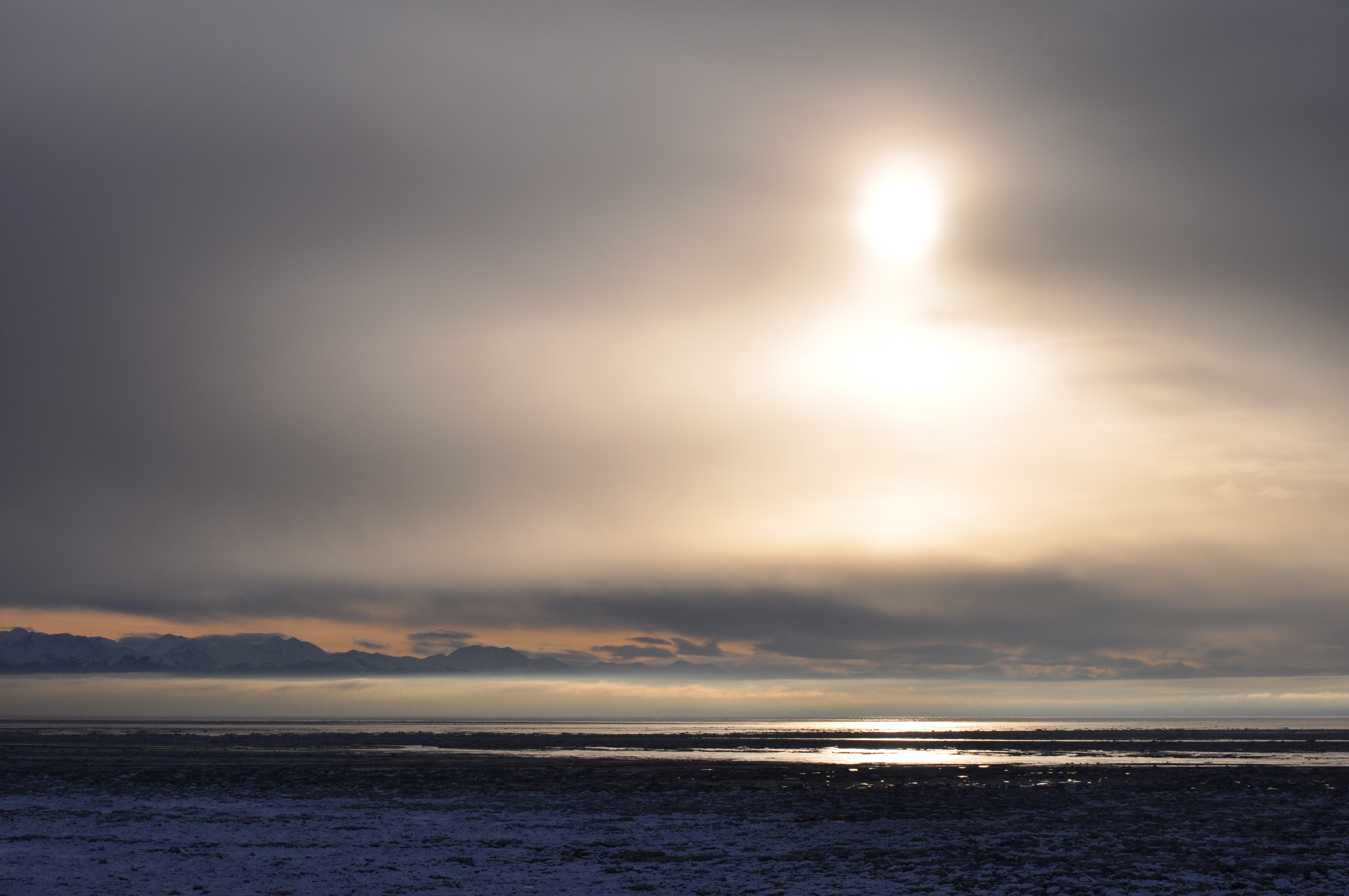
The mouth of Turnagain Arm at low tide in winter; thousands of icebergs lie stranded on vast plains of glacial silt

Turnagain Arm and Knik Arm are known for large areas of silt. At low tide, much of this is exposed, making marine navigation difficult. Historically, ships and boats designed for the area had a relatively flat bottom with a modest centerboard and absence of a large keel because the boats would occasionally become beached at low tide either on purpose or by accident. This design allowed the craft to support its weight on land without sustaining any serious damage to its structure. An example of this design is the Nomad, a much photographed fishing boat once owned by Joe Reddington which has sat on a mudflat near Knik for several decades.

These mudflats can also be dangerous to walk on, exhibiting quicksand-like characteristics, and have claimed the life of at least four people who have wandered out on them, usually tourists, with many more being rescued every year.

Cruise ships dock at Seward on the Gulf of Alaska or Whittier in Prince William Sound and transport passengers via bus or train to Anchorage. However, over 95% of freight entering Alaska comes through the Port of Anchorage, which is served by major container ship companies and other carriers.

== Conservation ==
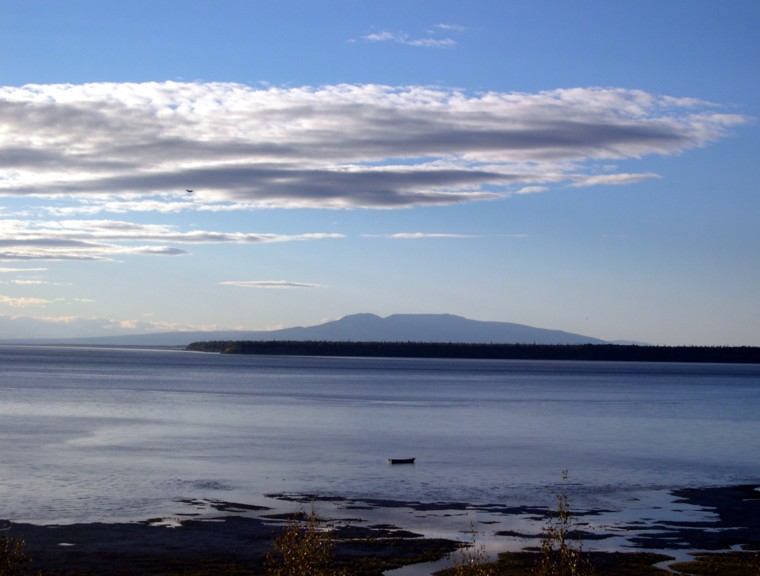
View across Cook Inlet at low tide from downtown Anchorage, Alaska (September 2005)

The Cook Inlet beluga whale is a genetically distinct and geographically isolated stock. The population fell to 278 in 2005 and it is listed as critically endangered in the IUCN Red List of Threatened Species. This was perhaps due to local hunt, although an article in the Anchorage Daily News questioned this conclusion. Killer whales commonly feed on belugas in the Cook Inlet, driving them to the upper part of the inlet where they often seek refuge in the shallower waters of the arms.

In 2000, the US National Marine Fisheries Service listed the Cook Inlet beluga whale population as depleted and began development of a conservation plan. On October 22, 2008 the Cook Inlet beluga whale was put onto the endangered species list. Cook Inlet activities include commercial fishing, oil and gas development, release of treated sewage, noise from aircraft and ships, shipping traffic, and tourism. However, it is not known what impact these activities had on the beluga whale population.

The Coastal Marine Institute at the University of Alaska Fairbanks's School of Fisheries and Ocean Sciences working with the U.S. Department of the Interior's Minerals Management Service (MMS), began a three-year project in 2003 focusing on the water circulation in Cook Inlet.

Cook Inletkeeper, a member of the Waterkeeper Alliance, began in 1994 when a group of Alaskans became concerned about the rapid ecological changes in the inlet. The group formally incorporated the following year using settlement proceeds from a Clean Water Act lawsuit against Cook Inlet oil and gas producers. Their stated mission is to "protect Alaska's Cook Inlet watershed and the life it sustains," with a focus on clean water, healthy habitat, local economies, and energy. They are based in Homer.

== See also ==
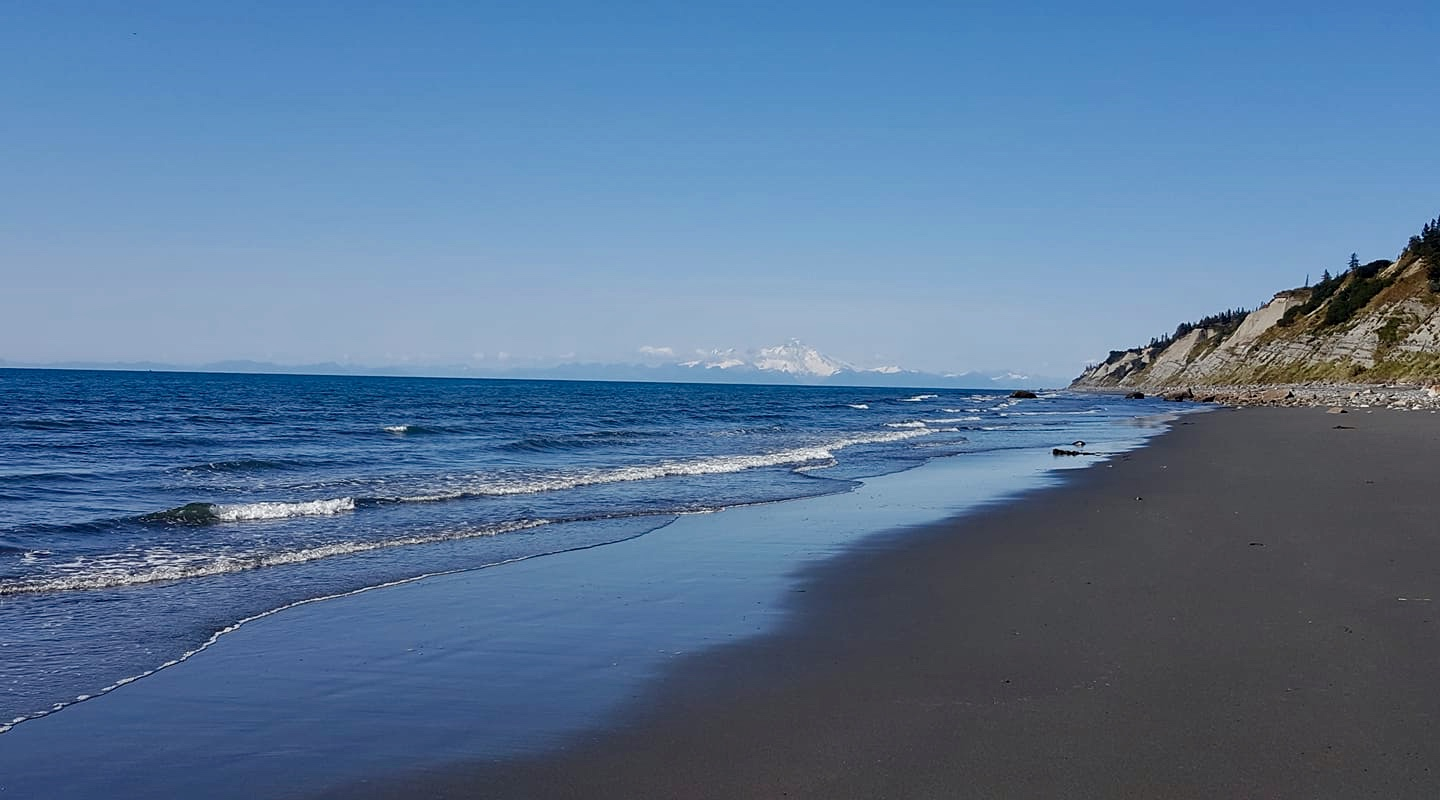
Cook Inlet seen from the mouth of Kachemak Bay, with Mount Iliamna in the background

- Alaska Wildlife Conservation Center
- Augustine Volcano
- Kalgin Island
- Knik Arm Bridge
- Lake Clark National Park
- Captain Cook State Recreation Area
