= Tyonek, Alaska =

Tyonek, Alaska Qaggeyshlat
- Census-designated place
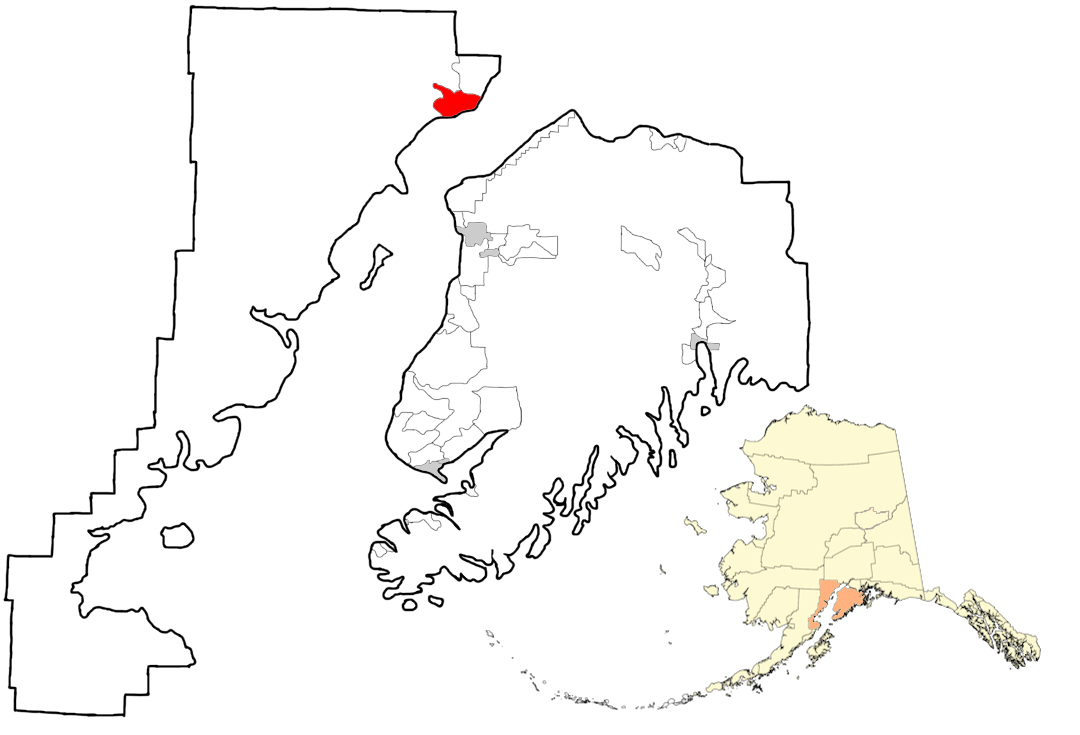
- Location in Kenai Peninsula Borough, Alaska
- Coordinates: 61.068°N 151.141°W
- Country: United States
- State: Alaska
- Borough: Kenai Peninsula

Government
  - Borough mayor: Peter Micciche
  - State senator: Lyman Hoffman (D)
  - State rep.: Bryce Edgmon (I)

Area
  - Total: 69.04 sq mi (178.80 km^{2})
  - Land: 67.93 sq mi (175.94 km^{2})
  - Water: 1.10 sq mi (2.86 km^{2})

Population (2020)
  - Total: 152
  - Density: 2.2/sq mi (0.86/km^{2})
- Time zone: UTC-9 (Alaska (AKST))
  - Summer (DST): UTC-8 (AKDT)
- ZIP code: 99682
- Area code: 907
- FIPS code: 02-79890

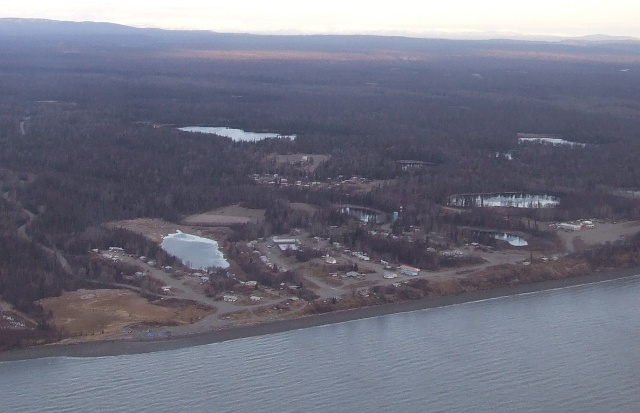
Tyonek, AK

Tyonek or Present / New Tyonek (Dena'ina: Qaggeyshlat - ″little place between toes") is a census-designated place (CDP) in Kenai Peninsula Borough in the U.S. state of Alaska. As of the 2020 census the population was 152, down from 171 in 2010. In 1973, the community formed the Tyonek Native Corporation (TNC) under the Alaska Native Claims Settlement Act and is federally recognized.

== History ==
A Dena'ina Alaska Native village at Tyonek was noted by the explorer James Cook in 1778. The Lebedev-Lastochkin Company, a Russian fur trade venture, maintained a small trapping station on the site of Tyonek. A detachment of the Vancouver Expedition under Joseph Whidbey visited the trading post in May 1794. Whidbey found that the LLC maintained "one large house, about fifty feet long, twenty-four wide, and about ten feet high; this was appropriated to the residence of nineteen Russians..." A smallpox epidemic in the late 1830s killed about half the population. Tyonek became a major port during the Resurrection Creek gold rush of the 1880s, but declined after the founding of Anchorage on the other side of Cook Inlet in 1915. Tyonek was moved to its current site when the original village, located on lower ground, flooded in the 1930s.

== Geography ==
Tyonek is located at 61°3′38″N 151°13′51″W (61.060470, -151.230697). Although politically in the Kenai Peninsula Borough, it is located on the mainland on the northwest side of Cook Inlet, across from the Kenai Peninsula. It is bordered to the northeast by the community of Beluga.

According to the United States Census Bureau, the CDP has a total area of 69.0 square miles (178.6 km^{2}), of which 67.9 square miles (175.8 km^{2}) are land and 1.1 square miles (2.9 km^{2}), or 1.61%, are water. The CDP extends from Trading Bay in the west to the mouth of the Chuitna River in the northeast. The present village of Tyonek, with an airstrip, is in the northeast part of the CDP, between the Chuitna River and Tyonek Creek.

== Demographics ==
Historical population
Census	Pop.	Note	%±
1880	117		—
1890	115		−1.7%
1900	107		−7.0%
1920	58		—
1930	78		34.5%
1940	136		74.4%
1950	132		−2.9%
1960	187		41.7%
1970	232		24.1%
1980	239		3.0%
1990	154		−35.6%
2000	193		25.3%
2010	171		−11.4%
2020	152		−11.1%
U.S. Decennial Census

Tyonek first appeared on the 1880 U.S. Census as the unincorporated Tinneh village of "Toyonok Station and Village". It featured 117 residents, including 109 Tinneh, 6 Creole (Mixed Russian & Native) and 2 Whites. This settlement was initially located at Beshta Bay. It returned again as "Toyonok" in 1890 with 115 residents, all Native. In 1900, it returned as Tyonek. It did not report on the 1910 census. It returned again in 1920. In 1930, it reported 78 residents, of which 74 were Native and 4 were White.

In the early 1930s, residents began to relocate 7 miles (11 km) northeast to a new site, the "new" Tyonek, situated on higher ground because of flooding. The original site became known as "Old Tyonek" or Tubughnen ("beach land"). Beginning with the 1940 census, the figures reflected the "New / Second Tyonek" or Tank'itnu ("fish dock stream"). Old Tyonek did not report separately again. The ″Present / New Tyonek″ or Qaggeyshlat (″little place between toes") was made a census-designated place (CDP) in 1980. The boundaries of the CDP now include the original (Old) Tyonek.

As of the census of 2000, there were 193 people, 66 households, and 45 families residing in the CDP. The population density was 2.9 inhabitants per square mile (1.1/km^{2}). There were 134 housing units at an average density of 2.0 per square mile (0.77/km^{2}). The racial makeup of the CDP was 4.66% White and 95.34% Native American. 2.59% of the population were Hispanic or Latino of any race.

There were 66 households, out of which 42.4% had children under the age of 18 living with them, 27.3% were married couples living together, 22.7% had a female householder with no husband present, and 31.8% were non-families. 30.3% of all households were made up of individuals, and 7.6% had someone living alone who was 65 years of age or older. The average household size was 2.92 and the average family size was 3.42.

In the CDP, the population was spread out, with 37.3% under the age of 18, 6.7% from 18 to 24, 33.7% from 25 to 44, 17.1% from 45 to 64, and 5.2% who were 65 years of age or older. The median age was 28 years. For every 100 females, there were 124.4 males. For every 100 females age 18 and over, there were 128.3 males.

The median income for a household in the CDP was $26,667, and the median income for a family was $29,792. Males had a median income of $26,250 versus $26,250 for females. The per capita income for the CDP was $11,261. About 2.1% of families and 13.9% of the population were below the poverty line, including none of those under the age of eighteen or sixty five or over.
